= 2022 notable events in American television =

The following is a list of notable events in American television in 2022.

== January ==
Date	Event	Source
1	Kentucky's Fox affiliate WDKY launched its own news department in January 2022, ending a 27-year outsourcing deal with a CBS affiliate. The move follows a studio upgrade and comes with expanded news coverage.	
3	The Major League Baseball-owned MLB Network declines to renew the contract of insider Ken Rosenthal; it is believed to be the result of Rosenthal's criticisms of league commissioner Rob Manfred's handling of the pandemic-altered 2020 season. Rosenthal retains positions as MLB reporter for Fox Sports and writer for The Athletic (where he penned his critiques of Manfred).	
3	Art Rascon retires from broadcasting after 36 years, 23 of which were with KTRK-TV/Houston (serving as a midday and 5:00 p.m. anchor and field reporter). On his final day at the ABC O&O, Rascon co-anchors its 11:00 a.m. newscast alongside son Jacob (previously with rival NBC affiliate KPRC), who made his KTRK debut as an anchor/reporter on that date.	
4–6	Two late-night talk shows pause production after their hosts test positive for COVID-19: NBC's Late Night cancels its scheduled tapings through January 6 in the wake of host Seth Meyers' positive test one day after their January 3 return from a holiday production hiatus (Meyers' guests for that show joined in remotely). On the 6th, CBS' Late Late Show also goes dark through January 18 due to James Corden's own positive test. Meyers' and Corden's diagnoses come after Jimmy Fallon, whose The Tonight Show tapes in the same building as Late Night, revealed he tested COVID-positive after his show's December 17 taping, just before Tonight's own holiday hiatus; Fallon (who was fully vaccinated, as are Meyers and Corden) fully recovered before production resumed on January 3, meaning Tonight did not have to face postponements. However, Fallon was revealed to have been intended to make a cameo on Saturday Night Live's December 18 episode, and thus may have contributed to the episode's emergency reformatting. Late Night would return with Meyers hosting remotely for the week of January 10–13 with most crew members working from home or in-studio, before returning to the studio.	
5	Thirteen current and former female staffers file a gender discrimination lawsuit against the Black News Channel in the U.S. District Court for the Northern District of Illinois, claiming that management paid female employees significantly less than male staffers, harbored a misogynistic work culture that forced them to conform to behavioral gender stereotypes, and retaliated against those who complained about the pay disparities and personal treatment. Two of the plaintiffs in the amended lawsuit had filed a prior complaint against BNC in August 2021.	
5	After Kevin Porter Jr. hits a game-winning three-pointer, Washington Wizards broadcaster Glenn Consor remarks on the NBC Sports Washington broadcast that the Houston Rockets star, "like his dad, pulled the trigger at the right time." But Consor's comment draws the ire on social media, from LeBron James and others, as Porter's father went to prison after pleading guilty in the 1993 shooting death of a 14-year-old girl. In apologizing for the incident, Consor claimed he thought Kevin Porter Jr. was related to former Washington player Kevin Porter.	
7	The Magnolia Network, which replaced DIY Network three days before, pulls the home renovation series Home Work from their schedule and Discovery+ presence (where it had streamed since the summer of 2021), following allegations from three subject families of not meeting timelines, high additional costs, and lack of communication by the show's hosts, Andy and Candis Meredith. The show would be returned to the lineups on January 13.	
7	By earning $42,220 in her 28th victory, Amy Schneider becomes the first female contestant and fourth overall to win over $1 million in regular gameplay on Jeopardy!. Schneider would go on to surpass Matt Amodio for the second-most consecutive wins in the game show's history with her 39th victory on January 24. Her win streak ended at 40 two days later. (Ken Jennings, who has presided over Schneider's win streak as part-time interim host, holds the most consecutive wins with 74 during his streak as Jeopardy! champion in 2004.)	
9	The Hollywood Foreign Press Association (HFPA) hands out the 79th Golden Globe Awards, with notable TV winners including Succession (Best Drama Series), Hacks (Best Comedy Series), and Pose's Mj Rodriguez (the first openly trans person to win a Globe, for Best Actress in a Drama Series). The Globes are distributed in a private, non-televised ceremony (and winners announced via press release and the HPFA's social media channels) in light of broadcast rightsholder NBC's support of a boycott by various media organizations, actors, and other creatives over the HFPA's inadequate efforts to address the membership diversity of the organization (NBC carried the final game of the NFL regular season played between the Los Angeles Chargers and Las Vegas Raiders on this evening).	
12	Richard Burgi confirms in an Instagram post that he was fired from The Young and the Restless for an inadvertent breach of distributor Sony Pictures Television's COVID-19 protocols, disclosing that he isolated for five days after testing COVID-positive during the CBS soap opera's holiday production hiatus in December—in accordance with prior CDC guidelines, revised that month to a five-day isolation period—rather than the SPT requirement for personnel to isolate for ten days which had not been revised. He then returned to the set five days early, testing negative twice. In contrast to other soap actors that were fired for COVID policy violations in 2021, some of whom publicly criticized their studios and networks, Burgi expressed sincere regret for his judgement. Robert Newman, known for playing Josh Lewis on Guiding Light off-and-on from 1981 until its 2009 conclusion, assumed the role of Ashland Locke (which Burgi had played since the character debuted in March 2021) on the February 9 episode, and portrayed the character on-screen until July 25.	
14	DirecTV announces it would cease carriage of One America News Network and AWE when the namesake satellite provider and sister service U-verse TV's contract with parent company Herring Networks expires on April 4. The radicalist-leaning, conservative OAN has received criticism for pushing conspiracy theories (particularly involving COVID-19 vaccines and health restrictions, and debunked claims of electoral fraud during the 2020 presidential election and left-wing involvement in the January 2021 attack on the U.S. Capitol) while gaining support from former president Donald Trump. Wealth culture-focused AWE has had issues involving the low overall appeal of its programming during economic recessions (most recently during the COVID-19 recession), and aggressive carriage demands. Seven months later on July 21, Verizon Fios, which became the network's largest remaining pay-TV carrier after the DirecTV removal, announced it would drop OAN on July 31, after failing to agree on a new contract; this relegates OAN's distribution to smaller cable providers and OTA subchannels in select markets, ad-supported live-TV streaming platforms (including Pluto TV and Xumo), and its proprietary subscription streaming service.	
19	WSAZ/Huntington, West Virginia, multimedia journalist Tori Yorgey is struck by an SUV while reporting live from the scene of a water main break in Dunbar during that night's 11:00 p.m. newscast. Yorgey—who conducted the report roadside in wet and icy conditions, and continued with the report afterward—was uninjured, but was taken to a local hospital for observation as a precaution. (The accident occurred during Yorgey's last week at WSAZ; she became a reporter for ABC affiliate WTAE/Pittsburgh on February 1.)	
24	Deadline Hollywood reports ViacomCBS (now Paramount Global) halted its proposed reformatting of the general entertainment Paramount Network as the primarily film-focused Paramount Movie Network, citing the success of original drama series Yellowstone and COVID-related production delays of its planned telefilm output. First announced in September 2020, the reformatted channel was to offer original made-for-cable movies (including 52 new films per year), limited scripted series and miniseries (at least one per quarter), and films from the Paramount Pictures library. In preparation for the change, several of the network's original unscripted programs were either canceled outright or moved to its sister channels or to Paramount+ during late 2020 and 2021.	
25	Bravo fires Jennie Nguyen from the cast of The Real Housewives of Salt Lake City after racially offensive comments and memes, including many mocking the Black Lives Matter movement, that she shared on Facebook during the 2020 anti-police brutality protests had resurfaced on social media.	
26	TLC fires Alina Kozhevnikova from the cast of 90 Day Fiancé (as well as spin-offs Before the 90 Days and the upcoming 90 Day Fiancé: Tell All) after past social media posts mocking various races and religions resurfaced (among them, a now-deleted 2014 post in which she used "nigga" eight times when describing a party she had been invited to in her native Russia, and one from 2015 mocking Hugh Grant's eldest daughter, who is half-Chinese, for being "kinda Asian.").	
27	Stephanie Ruhle is named permanent anchor of The 11th Hour. In addition to her usual 9:00 a.m. ET slot (absorbed by Morning Joe upon her move), she had been serving as one of several rotating hosts of the MSNBC program since original anchor Brian Williams's departure from the network in December. Ruhle's first 11th Hour broadcast aired March 2, with Morning Joe's expanded fourth hour airing on April 4.	
31	During a discussion on The View about the controversy surrounding the McMinn County, Tennessee school district's January 10 ban of the Holocaust-focused graphic novel Maus, moderator Whoopi Goldberg claims that the Holocaust was about "man's inhumanity to man" and not based on race (appearing to characterize race—as she clarified during her appearance on that night's The Late Show with Stephen Colbert—in the narrower construct of ethnicity/skin color, rather than the broader outgroup context in line with Adolf Hitler and his Nazi Party's view of Jews as an "inferior race" on religious grounds). Goldberg later apologized for the remarks amid widespread criticism from Jewish groups, and was placed on a two-week suspension by ABC News on February 1; she returned to The View on February 14.	

== February ==
Date	Event	Source
2	Jeff Zucker resigns as President of CNN, a role he held since 2013, after admitting that he failed to disclose his romantic relationship with CNN Executive Vice President and Chief Marketing Officer Allison Gollust, a former aide to ex-New York Governor Andrew Cuomo in the wake of the sexual harassment allegations that led to Cuomo's resignation the year prior. The scandal also led to the December 2021 firing of Cuomo Prime Time host Chris Cuomo for assisting in his brother's defense against the allegations. Gollust would resign on February 15, after the investigation's findings that they all violated company policy was released. On February 26, it was reported Chris Licht, co-creator of Morning Joe and executive producer of The Late Show with Stephen Colbert, would become CNN's new president upon formation of Warner Bros. Discovery.	
2	Deadline Hollywood reports that The Masked Singer judges Robin Thicke and Ken Jeong walked off a taping of the Fox series the previous week after Rudy Giuliani was revealed to be a contestant. The other judges, Jenny McCarthy and Nicole Scherzinger, remained on stage and spoke with the former New York City mayor who was among the allies of Donald Trump challenging the results of the 2020 election. The episode aired on April 20, the seventh week of the competition.	
3–20	The 2022 Winter Olympics took place in Beijing, China, and aired on NBC and its U.S. cable networks as well as streaming on Peacock. The event marked the first time that NBC has broadcast the Olympics in back-to-back years, having aired the 2020 Summer Olympics less than seven months prior due to the COVID-19 pandemic delaying the event from its original July 2020 start date. (The Summer and Winter Olympics—for which NBC assumed exclusive broadcast rights in 1988 and 2002, respectively—have typically alternated every two years within each four-year interval since 1994, and occurred in the same calendar year during each interval from 1924 to 1992, outside of World War II-prompted cancellations.) It also marks the first time that NBCUniversal will provide full streaming coverage without requiring a pay-TV subscription, as Peacock will provide live coverage of all Olympic events, with replays made available upon each event's conclusion, as well as ancillary content (including opening, closing and medal ceremonies, and NBC's prime time and studio programming) via its subscription tiers. (NBC previously restricted access to most event livestreams via provider login through its dedicated Olympics website and app; however, Peacock provided limited live event coverage without such a requirement for the 2020 games.) On January 19, NBC Sports announced that all announcing talent for the games would be based out of its studios in Stamford, Connecticut, in response to the Omicron variant.	
5	Andrea Bordeaux is fired from the Starz series Run the World, after she refused to comply with the show's COVID-19 vaccine mandate. Bordeaux's character, Ella McFair, would not be recast.	
7	Bertram van Munster, co-creator and executive producer of The Amazing Race, is sued on multiple complaints (including fraud, breach of oral contract and misappropriation of trade secrets) filed in the Los Angeles Superior Court by former CBS executive Leigh Collier, who alleged that van Munster recreated New Media Collective, a production company that they originally co-founded in 2014 before dissolving two years later, without her knowledge. Collier is seeking a share of profits and a 33% interest in the company.	
9	In a first for ESPN's NBA coverage, this evening's broadcast of a Golden State Warriors–Utah Jazz NBA game is headed by an all-female on-air crew, including play-by-play announcer Beth Mowins, analyst Doris Burke, and sideline reporter Lisa Salters. Additionally, the broadcast's directing chair and 33 other production positions in Salt Lake City (where the game is played) and ESPN's Bristol, Connecticut control room are occupied by female staffers.	
13	The Los Angeles Rams defeat the Cincinnati Bengals 23–20 in Super Bowl LVI at SoFi Stadium in Inglewood, California, on NBC. The game—which was the first Super Bowl to take place on a calendar date falling within the scheduled date range of an ongoing Olympics event—was originally going to be aired on CBS, but it was traded to NBC (under an agreement reached in March 2019) so that it could be paired with the Winter Olympics to avoid potential dilution of viewership and advertising revenue for the two events. The switch also affected the NFL Honors, which occurred on February 10 broadcast on ABC and ESPN. The halftime show was headlined by rappers Dr. Dre, Snoop Dogg, Eminem, Mary J. Blige and Kendrick Lamar with appearances by 50 Cent and Anderson .Paak. The game marked the last for Al Michaels as NBC's lead play-by-play broadcaster. He will remain with NBC in an emeritus capacity while also joining Prime Video as its play-by-play broadcaster for Thursday Night Football beginning with the 2022 season (Mike Tirico becomes the primary NBC Sunday Night Football announcer in the process). The Super Bowl is also the final NBC Sports assignment for sideline reporter Michele Tafoya, who left to pursue a career as a conservative commentator and political consultant. It is also Pepsi's last sponsored halftime show following the expiration of their 10-year contract.	
14	Friends of WLRN Inc., which has served as the fundraising arm of School Board of Miami-Dade County's public broadcasting operations since 1974, agrees to take over full-management of secondary PBS member station WLRN-TV and its news/talk FM sister (including its digital channels and satellite FM station WKWM/Marathon). The group had clashed with the school board in recent years after Miami-Dade County Schools Superintendent Alberto Carvalho and a committee recommended that a competing bid by South Florida PBS (which operates WPBT/Miami and WXEL/West Palm Beach) be selected.	
16	ViacomCBS changes its name to Paramount Global. The rebranding—which draws from its flagship studio Paramount Pictures and namesake streaming service Paramount+—retires the Viacom name after 52 years, dating back to the original company (originally formed as the CBS-owned syndication unit CBS Television Film Sales in 1952) and carried over to its successor entity following the 2006 separation of CBS and the original Viacom's assets.	
17	Former 9-1-1 star Rockmond Dunbar sues 20th Television and parent The Walt Disney Company over its COVID-19 vaccine mandate, and their rejection of the religious exemptions he sought which led to his abrupt departure from the series in November. He claims discrimination and career sabotage.	
17	Everett Fitzhugh (filling in for regular play-by-play announcer John Forslund) and J. T. Brown call this date's Seattle Kraken-Winnipeg Jets game for Root Sports Northwest, and in doing so make history as the first all-Black duo to call a National Hockey League TV broadcast.	
22	Standard General and Apollo Global Management announce their intent to acquire Tegna Inc. for $5.4 billion; a Standard General affiliate company would assume voting equity in Tegna, while Cox Media Group and Apollo (through funding managed by an Apollo affiliate firm) would hold securities not attributable to voting interests. Concurrently, Cox (which is majority owned by Apollo) would acquire Tegna-owned stations in Austin (KVUE), Dallas–Fort Worth (WFAA and KMPX) and Houston (KHOU and KTBU), and Standard-owned stations in Paducah–Cape Girardeau (KBSI and WDKA), Lincoln (KLKN) and Providence (WLNE); Standard would acquire WFXT/Boston from Cox in turn. Deb McDermott would have been appointed as Tegna's CEO after the sale's closure, which was expected to occur during the second half of 2022; however, the sale was aborted on May 22, 2023.	
24	CNN announces it will cut back the use of its "squeezeback" ad units, which allow for commercials to play without cutting away from live coverage; the network's move follows juxtaposition of upbeat ads, including one from Applebee's against footage of air raid sirens sounding across Kyiv, coming out of its coverage of the ongoing Russian invasion of Ukraine (Applebee's would pull its ads from the network altogether).	
24	California–Oregon Broadcasting Inc. announces its intent to sell its Eugene, Oregon, duopoly of Fox affiliate KLSR-TV and MyNetworkTV affiliate KEVU-CD to Cox Media Group; the purchase price was not initially disclosed. Following its expected completion during the second quarter of the year, the sale will leave NBC affiliate KOBI/Medford and its Klamath Falls satellite KOTI as California–Oregon Broadcasting's only remaining television properties.	
26	The 53rd NAACP Image Awards are held with Anthony Anderson hosting.	
27	KCRG-TV/Cedar Rapids, Iowa, announces the termination of its morning anchor Jay Greene for an undisclosed incident the station determined violated its code of conduct. The firing leaves the Gray Television-owned ABC affiliate with two anchor openings, as evening anchor Chris Earl departed for a position in Florida earlier in the month.	
27	The 28th Screen Actors Guild Awards air on TBS and TNT from the Barker Hangar in Santa Monica, California. It would end up being the final ceremony aired on the networks (see May 4 entry). Noted TV-related winners include the casts of Succession and Ted Lasso (Outstanding Drama and Comedy Series Ensembles), as well as Lee Jung-jae and HoYeon Jung (Outstanding Male and Female Drama Series Actors) of Squid Game, the first non-English language TV series to win SAG Awards.	
28	A group representing owners and executives of the original United States Football League (fronted by Larry Csonka, acting in his capacity as former general manager of that league's Jacksonville Bulls), files a federal lawsuit against Fox Sports and subsidiary National Spring Football League Enterprises Co, LLC, seeking an injunction to prevent a new, Fox-owned USFL from using the trademarks associated with the original league (which operated from 1983 to 1986 and was officially dissolved in 1990). On April 14, a judge rules that, though the plaintiffs were "likely to prevail" on their trademark infringement claim, there was little risk of "irreparable harm" in allowing the new USFL and its eight initial teams to proceed play two days later (see April 16 entry) using league and team names and insignias employed by the original league.	

== March ==
Date	Event	Source
1	Turner Sports obtains the English-language rights to United States men's and women's national soccer team matches beginning in 2023. Through the United States Soccer Federation's eight-year deal with the WarnerMedia division, HBO Max will stream more than 20 matches, with TNT or TBS simulcasting select matches. Turner's Bleacher Report website also gains rights to expanded content through the agreement.	
1	Production on Season 7 of Nailed It! is permanently suspended after staffers on the Netflix baking competition go on strike, an effort to win a union contract between the International Alliance of Theatrical Stage Employees and the show's production company, Magical Elves. The four episodes that had been finished are expected to run on Netflix in the fall, to coincide with the season's Halloween theme.	
7	The 57th Academy of Country Music Awards are broadcast on Amazon Prime Video from Allegiant Stadium in Paradise, Nevada. Hosted by Dolly Parton, it is one of the first major awards ceremonies on U.S. television to move exclusively to a subscription video on demand (SVOD) streaming service. (Prime Video replaced previous rightsholder CBS, which had aired the ACMs from 1998 to 2021.) With two wins each, Miranda Lambert ("Entertainer of the Year", and "Video of the Year" for "Drunk (And I Don't Wanna Go Home)" in collaboration with Elle King), Carly Pearce ("Female Artist of the Year", and "Music Event of the Year" for "Never Wanted to Be That Girl" in collaboration with Ashley McBryde) and Lainey Wilson ("Song of the Year" for "Things a Man Oughta Know", and "New Female Artist of the Year") were tied for the most awards.	
8	Apple TV+ announces a deal with Major League Baseball to air a weekly doubleheader of Friday night games, a package that will launch with the 2022 season. Its first broadcasts will be April 8, with the New York Mets against the Washington Nationals and the Houston Astros against the Los Angeles Angels. The exclusive broadcasts—which will be produced by MLB and feature pre-game, post-game, and other ancillary programming—will be the first foray into live-streaming sporting events for Apple TV+.	
13	The 27th Critics' Choice Awards aired simultaneously on both TBS and The CW (the latter network is a joint venture between Paramount Global and WarnerMedia, thus the ability to simulcast with TBS, in an arrangement announced on October 26, 2021). The ceremony—co-hosted by Taye Diggs and Nicole Byer, and coinciding with the 75th BAFTA Awards—took place at the Fairmont Century Plaza Hotel in Los Angeles, California. The awards were postponed from its original January 9 date on December 22, 2021, due to safety concerns related to the COVID Omicron variant. With four awards, Ted Lasso had the most wins among television nominees ("Best Comedy Series", Jason Sudeikis for "Best Actor in a Comedy Series", Brett Goldstein for "Best Supporting Actor in a Comedy Series", and Hannah Waddingham for "Best Supporting Actress in a Comedy Series").	
14	Fox News says its state department correspondent Benjamin Hall was injured while reporting on the war in Ukraine near Kyiv. Hall's cameraman, Pierre Zakrzewski and consultant Oleksandra "Sasha" Kuvshynova were killed by the blast that leaves Hall with severe injuries to his legs, a hand, and an eye, as well as damage to his hearing.	
16	Confirming an earlier report by the New York Post's Andrew Marchand, ESPN announces that Joe Buck will join the network as play-by-play announcer for Monday Night Football beginning in the 2022 NFL season, working alongside Fox Sports partner Troy Aikman, who had earlier agreed to join ESPN in a separate five-year deal. One of Fox Sports' original on-air hires when it began operations in 1994, Buck had been its lead voice for Major League Baseball, USGA golf, and, with Aikman as analyst since 2002, NFL football. In exchange for granting Buck a release from the final year of his contract with Fox, the network receives from ESPN the rights to an extra Big Ten Conference football game for the 2022 college football season.	
17	Amazon closes its acquisition of Metro-Goldwyn-Mayer, an $8.5 billion deal first announced in May 2021, which included ownership of MGM Television, and pay television channels Epix, Screenpix and MGM HD, and management interests in Sinclair-owned multicast networks Charge! and Comet. In addition to maintaining the studio's existing planned productions and scheduled releases, Amazon will not relegate MGM's television and film content exclusively to Prime Video and IMDb TV, allowing the studio to continue licensing its titles to linear television networks and competing streaming services.	
22	The 2022 iHeartRadio Music Awards air on Fox with LL Cool J hosting.	
27	The 94th Academy Awards air on ABC from the Dolby Theatre, and was co-hosted by Wanda Sykes, Amy Schumer and Regina Hall. The ceremony's later-than-usual date avoided a conflict with the Winter Olympics. CODA won Best Picture, becoming the first streaming-exclusive film to win the award, and Apple TV+ the first streaming service to do so; it also won for Best Supporting Actor (Troy Kotsur, the first deaf actor to win the category) and Best Adapted Screenplay. Ariana DeBose won Best Supporting Actress for her role in West Side Story, becoming the first queer woman of color and first Afro-Latina to win a major Oscar category. During the Best Documentary Feature presentation, Will Smith slapped Chris Rock on-stage after the comedian ad-libbed a joke about Smith's wife, Jada Pinkett Smith's, shaved head during his monologue. (Pinkett Smith was diagnosed with alopecia areata in 2018.) ABC muted most of the audio from the confrontation, which aired in full on many international broadcasters, omitting Smith's remarks for Rock to "keep [Jada's] name out [of his] fucking mouth"; Smith apologized for the altercation in his Best Actor acceptance speech (for his role in King Richard) later in the ceremony and to Rock on Instagram the next day. The telecast ran for nearly four hours, despite a controversial attempt to trim its length by offloading eight awards to pre-recorded segments.	
29	Mick Mulvaney, former White House Chief of Staff under Donald Trump, is hired by CBS News as a contributor to provide analysis on political matters. Mulvaney's addition draws backlash within the network for his dismissal of the COVID-19 pandemic and the Trump-Ukraine scandal. Most notably, Stephen Colbert used his monologue on March 31's Late Show to criticize CBS over the hiring.	
30	Cox Media Group announces its intent to sell 18 television stations in 12 small and mid-sized markets (including the former Northwest Broadcasting stations, along with Fox affiliate WHBQ-TV/Memphis, dual CBS/NBC affiliate KYMA-DT/Yuma, and the Tulsa duopoly of Fox affiliate KOKI-TV and MyNetworkTV affiliate KMYT-TV) to Imagicomm Communications, a shell company affiliated with INSP parent Inspiration Ministries, for $488 million. The sale would be completed on August 1, and marked INSP's first foray into broadcast television.	

== April ==
Date	Event	Source
1	In an April Fools' Day prank on their audiences, late night's "Jimmys" swap shows: Jimmy Fallon travels to Los Angeles to host ABC's Jimmy Kimmel Live!, while Kimmel hosts NBC's Tonight Show from New York City. Justin Timberlake appears on Kimmel Live! initially as Matt Damon, while the Red Hot Chili Peppers appear as musical guests on both shows (their Kimmel Live! performance being pre-taped in Hollywood one day earlier).	
1	Citing sources, Axios reports that White House Press Secretary Jen Psaki is in discussions with MSNBC to host a program for NBCUniversal's streaming platform Peacock. She would also appear on the main MSNBC network as a contributor. She steps down as Press Secretary on May 13, succeeded by Karine Jean-Pierre. On May 24, the agreement is made official, and she would join the network in the fall, with her program Inside with Jen Psaki debuted on March 19, 2023.	
2	In a move to streamline production and newsgathering resources for the daily PBS newscast, WETA-TV/Washington, D.C., takes over production responsibilities for the PBS NewsHour's Saturday and Sunday editions from fellow member station WNET/Newark–New York City, which had produced the half-hour weekend broadcasts since their September 2013 debut. Now based in Washington and rechristened PBS News Weekend, the half-hour newscasts are anchored by former NBC/MSNBC correspondent Geoff Bennett; he succeeds original weekend anchor Hari Sreenivasan, who will remain a New York-based correspondent for the weekday broadcasts and serve as a contributor for Amanpour & Company.	
3	The 64th Annual Grammy Awards air on CBS from the MGM Grand Garden Arena in Las Vegas, with Trevor Noah hosting, and big winners including Silk Sonic (four awards, including Record and Song of the Year for "Leave the Door Open") and Jon Batiste (Album of the Year for We Are). This Grammy ceremony had been postponed from January 31 due to safety concerns related to the Omicron variant, while scheduling conflicts at its original venue, Los Angeles' Crypto.com Arena, prompted its move to Vegas. Its only the second time a Grammy ceremony was not held in L.A. or New York (the 15th edition took place in Nashville in 1973).	
4	The Kansas Jayhawks defeat the North Carolina Tar Heels in the championship game of the 2022 NCAA Division I men's basketball tournament. The TBS broadcast from New Orleans' Caesars Superdome marks the last CBS Sports assignment for longtime director Bob Fishman, who retires from CBS after a 50-year career (47 with its sports division) that included, among various assignments, 39 of the 40 Final Fours CBS produced and/or aired since first obtaining tournament broadcast rights in 1982 (the tournament has been a CBS/Turner Sports partnership since 2011). This is also the last Men's final four to be overseen by President Mark Emmert for the NCAA. Though he remains a consultant for the NCAA until June 2023. Emmert steps back from college basketball after overseen 11 tournaments since his appointment as NCAA President in 2010. Charlie Baker will succeed Emmert as NCAA president in March 2023.	
4	Ryman Hospitality Properties announces that it will sell a combined 30% interest in Opry Entertainment—which operates the Grand Ole Opry concert stage show, Nashville venue Ryman Auditorium, radio station WSM and 50% of multicast network Circle (the other half owned by Gray Television)—to a joint partnership of NBCUniversal and investment company Atairos for $293 million. Ryman will retain 70% equity in Opry Entertainment.	
6	On the heels of its deal with Apple TV+ (see March 8 entry), Major League Baseball announces a second live-streaming deal with the NBCUniversal-owned Peacock. Beginning with a Chicago White Sox/Boston Red Sox game on May 8, Peacock will air games for 18 consecutive Sunday mornings (thru September 4) that start at 11:30 a.m. ET (12 noon ET from June 19 onward). The MLB Sunday Leadoff games are exclusive to Peacock (save for that May 8 broadcast, which was simulcast on NBC), and also feature pre- and post-game coverage; exclusive carriage of the All-Star Futures Game; and access to MLB's vault of highlights, classic games, and documentaries. The deal is a reuniting of MLB with NBC Sports, which covered the game from the 1930s thru 1989, and was also involved in The Baseball Network (1994–1995) and postseason and All-Star Game broadcasts with Fox Sports (1996–2000).	
8	With Joe Buck and Troy Aikman having departed for ESPN (see March 16 entry), Fox Sports formally names Joe Davis as the new lead play-by-play announcer on its Major League Baseball broadcasts, where he will work alongside analyst John Smoltz. Later on May 31, the network would announce Kevin Burkhardt and former tight end Greg Olsen as their new lead NFL announcers for the 2022 season.	
8	The WarnerMedia-Discovery, Inc. merger closes, resulting in the formation of Warner Bros. Discovery. Discovery CEO David Zaslav takes over as CEO of the combined company, while Discovery chief lifestyle brands officer Kathleen Finch assumes oversight of most of the company's U.S. linear entertainment, lifestyle and factual networks (including, among others, TBS, TNT, Cartoon Network, Discovery Channel, TLC, HGTV and Food Network) and the new Warner Bros. Discovery Sports unit (formed through a reorganizational split of the former WarnerMedia News & Sports division and includes Turner Sports and AT&T SportsNet, the former of which has an executive vacancy); Warner Bros. Television chief Channing Dungey, and Home Box Office, Inc. and HBO Max chief content officer Casey Bloys (who will also oversee Magnolia Network, which reported directly to Zaslav under Discovery) maintain their existing roles. (Chris Licht, who was appointed as CEO of the rechristened CNN Global shortly before the merger's completion, will take over as CEO in May.)	
9	The 2022 Kids' Choice Awards are held with Miranda Cosgrove and Rob Gronkowski hosting.	
11	The 2022 CMT Music Awards air on CBS from the Nashville Municipal Auditorium, and was hosted by Anthony Mackie, Kelsea Ballerini (who hosted and performed virtually due to testing positive for an asymptomatic case of COVID-19) and Kane Brown (who stepped in as a co-host following Ballerini's diagnosis). It is the first time the event, previously shown on CBS' cable sibling CMT, has aired on broadcast television, a move announced in June 2021 to fill the void left by CBS' loss of the Academy of Country Music Awards (see March 7 entry). The event was also bumped from April 3 by the rescheduled Grammy Awards. Jason Aldean, Carrie Underwood (both winning "Video of the Year" and "Collaborative Video of the Year" for their duet, "If I Didn't Love You") and Cody Johnson (for "Male Video of the Year" for "'Til You Can't" and "Digital-First Performance of the Year" for "Dear Rodeo") were the top winners at the ceremony, each earning two awards.	
11	Returning to her MSNBC primetime show after a two-month hiatus, Rachel Maddow announces that beginning in May, she will host only one night per week, Mondays (and additional nights when the news warrants), to allow her "more time to work on some of this other stuff I've got cooking" for MSNBC and NBC News. Come May, the network would replace the void Maddow leaves at the 9:00 p.m. ET Tuesday-thru-Friday slot with a rotation of guests hosts helming MSNBC Prime, an arrangement that lasted until August (see June 27 entry).	
11	For the first time since before the COVID-19 pandemic began, Comedy Central's The Daily Show with Trevor Noah records before a studio audience at its longtime home, NEP Studio 52 at 733 11th Avenue in New York City. During the previous 25 months, The Daily Show's episodes had originated audience-free from either Noah's home (as The Daily Social Distancing Show) or ViacomCBS' Times Square studios. It is the last American late-night show to resume regular in-studio production with a live audience.	
13	Frank Langella is fired from the Netflix miniseries The Fall of the House of Usher following an investigation into misconduct, eventually revealed as an inappropriate and unwelcome touch of the leg of an actor playing his wife during a love scene, and the refusal to follow specific commands from the show's intimacy coordinator. Set to play the lead role of Roderick Usher, he would be recast with Bruce Greenwood on April 29. Langella would claim in a Deadline Hollywood guest editorial detailing his view of the incident on May 5 that he was 'canceled'.	
14	Pat Foley retires from sports broadcasting after calling his final Chicago Blackhawks telecast for NBC Sports Chicago. A suburban Chicago native, Foley's broadcasting career spanned more than four decades, and was primarily spent calling play-by-play for the NHL's Blackhawks on radio and/or television since 1980 (with a two-year break from 2006 to 2008, during which called play-by-play for the AHL's Chicago Wolves).	
16	Fox and NBC simulcast the first game of the new United States Football League, a 28–24 victory by the Birmingham Stallions over the New Jersey Generals. The broadcast, produced by Fox (with halftime content by NBC) and attracting an estimated three million total viewers, is the first pro football game to be carried simultaneously by two broadcast networks since 2007 (NBC and CBS picked up NFL Network's coverage of a Patriots-Giants NFL game), and the first carried by two broadcast networks exclusively since 1967 (Super Bowl I, also by NBC and CBS). The new USFL's first-season games air on Fox, NBC, FS1, USA Network, and the Peacock streaming service.	
20	Southeastern Ohio Broadcasting System, Inc.—whose owners, the Littick family, have owned the TV station since its 1953 founding—announces its intent to sell NBC affiliate WHIZ-TV/Zanesville, Ohio (as well as sister radio stations WHIZ-AM/FM and WZVL) to Marquee Broadcasting for an undisclosed price. The sale was completed on July 15.	
21	This evening's episode of The Late Show with Stephen Colbert is cancelled after host Stephen Colbert tests positive for COVID-19. Though it was the only episode to be missed until May 2 (thanks to a previously scheduled production hiatus), the CBS show goes dark again for the week of May 9 after Colbert experiences "symptoms consistent with a recurrence" of the virus. He is reported COVID-free on May 15.	
23	Showtime and Paramount Television sever ties with producer David Hollander following an investigation into allegations of unspecified misconduct. Hollander had been developer and show-runner of the upcoming series American Gigolo for Showtime and Paramount (a show that had completed seven episodes of its 10-episode order at the time of his ouster), and had previously produced Ray Donovan and its follow-up movie for the network.	
26	Warner Bros. Discovery cuts original scripted programming development at cable networks TNT and TBS. The move, which is not immediately expected to impact both networks' respective current scripted programming slates, is estimated to save the media conglomerate $3 billion in operational and content spending.	
28	James Corden announces that he will be stepping down as host of The Late Late Show in mid-2023, after 8 1/2 years at the helm of the CBS late night talk show. The announcement comes after Corden secured a one-year contract extension with the network to conclude his run on the show.	

== May ==
Date	Event	Source
2	Jimmy Kimmel announces that he has tested positive for COVID-19; as a result, this date's episode of ABC's Jimmy Kimmel Live! is cancelled, with Mike Birbiglia filling in for Kimmel starting on May 3. While he would return for the week of May 9, he would test positive again the week of May 16, and so had Andy Samberg and John Mulaney fill in, in addition to being guests, for a live May 18 show.	
4	Amid a content restructuring of its Turner Networks unit, Warner Bros. Discovery announces it will not renew its contract with SAG-AFTRA to telecast the Screen Actors Guild Awards, which had been airing on TNT since 1998 and simulcast on TBS since 2007. On January 11, 2023, it was announced that the awards would air on Netflix's YouTube channel as a stopgap before a multi-year deal to stream on Netflix itself begins the following year, as part of the service's push into live streaming.	
6	20th Television announces that Fred Savage has been relieved of his duties as an executive producer and director on ABC's The Wonder Years following an investigation into three separate allegations of inappropriate on-set conduct by the star of the original series. Savage previously faced misconduct claims in March 2018, when Youngjoo Hwang, a costumer on his 2015–16 Fox sitcom The Grinder, filed a lawsuit alleging he engendered a hostile on-set environment for female staffers (including, in one incident, allegedly hitting her arm and yelling at her while she dusted his outfit).	
15	The 2022 Billboard Music Awards air on NBC and Peacock from MGM Grand Garden Arena. Olivia Rodrigo was the most-awarded artist of the night, scoring seven wins (including Top New Artist). Other major winners included Drake (with five awards, including Top Artist), BTS (with three awards, including Top Duo/Group, surpassing Destiny's Child as the most-awarded group in BBMA history with 12 wins overall), Justin Bieber (who became the first two-time Top Hot 100 Song Award winner since the category's 1990 inception) and Mary J. Blige (who was honored with the Icon Award).	
17	The XFL announces a five-year exclusive deal with The Walt Disney Company, granting broadcast rights for the league's 43-game package (40 regular season games, two semifinal playoff games and the championship) to ABC, ESPN and FX starting in 2023, when the XFL resumes operations after a two-year hiatus. (The initial 2020 revival of the league, which has since been acquired by a group led by Dwayne Johnson, was shortened by the COVID-19 pandemic.)	
21	The finale of Saturday Night Live's 47th season marks the departures of Aidy Bryant, Pete Davidson, Kate McKinnon, and Kyle Mooney. Each had been with the NBC sketch comedy series for at least eight seasons, their last as part of the largest single-season cast in SNL history. Their departures were later followed by those of fellow cast members Aristotle Athari (who had joined SNL that season as a featured player), Melissa Villaseñor and Alex Moffat (both of whom had been with the show since season 42) on September 1, and of Cecily Strong (who had been with the show since season 38) following the 48th season's fall finale on December 17.	
24	Hours after the Robb Elementary School shooting in Uvalde, Texas, CBS pulls the fourth season finale of FBI, an episode titled "Prodigal Son" (which centered on an investigation into a school shooting plot), from this evening's planned airing; a rerun of an earlier Season 4 episode ("Under Pressure," which originally aired February 1) is aired in its place. The episode would later air on October 4, as part of the show's fifth season.	
25	A technical glitch is blamed for WFAA/Dallas–Fort Worth not carrying the opening monologue of that night's Jimmy Kimmel Live!, in which Kimmel commented on the Uvalde shooting and called on Congressional lawmakers (including Texas Sen. Ted Cruz, who opposes such measures) to pass legislation to curb gun violence. The ABC affiliate noted that the program was scheduled to run later than its normal 10:35 p.m. Central slot due to a special edition of its late newscast focusing on the shooting; however, its automated master control system ended up playing a commercial break instead of Kimmel. WFAA management apologized for the error, which Kimmel did not believe to be intentional, and a clip of the monologue from the show's YouTube channel was embedded to the station's website.	
27	MSNBC airs a special episode of The 11th Hour with Stephanie Ruhle titled "Enough Is Enough" that discusses gun culture in the United States three days after the Uvalde shooting.	

== June ==
Date	Event	Source
7	Chrisley Knows Best stars Todd and Julie Chrisley are convicted by a federal jury on eight counts of bank fraud (including conspiracy to defraud banks out of more than $30 million in personal loans) and two counts of tax evasion as well as additional counts that Julie solely faced for wire fraud and obstruction of justice. Despite the conviction, the ninth season of their USA Network reality series (which completed filming before the trial) resumed as scheduled on June 23. The couple were indicted by the Georgia Department of Revenue in August 2019, but subsequently reached a settlement on state charges; a trial on the federal counts began at the U.S. District Court for the Northern District of Georgia in Atlanta on May 17. On November 21, the Chrisleys were respectively sentenced to twelve and seven years in prison, along with three years of supervised probation. USA subsequently cancelled Chrisley Knows Best and spin-off Growing Up Chrisley, although episodes from the former's previously renewed tenth season that were filmed prior to the trial will air as scheduled in 2023.	
9	The Walt Disney Company fires Peter Rice as Chairman of Disney General Entertainment Content; he is succeeded by Dana Walden.	
9	Broadcast networks ABC, CBS, NBC, and PBS, along with cable's CNN and MSNBC, and free streaming channels ABC News Live, CBS News 24/7, NBC News NOW and LiveNOW from Fox pre-empt prime time programming to broadcast live coverage of the first of a series of public hearings by the United States House Select Committee on the January 6 Attack. The Fox broadcast network and Fox News Channel carry their normal lineups, however, with the former's affiliates being allowed to pick up Fox Business' coverage on an individual basis. This night's hearing attracts at least an estimated (by Nielsen) 20 million viewers across traditional television, a number on par with NBC Sunday Night Football and the Macy's Thanksgiving Day Parade.	
12	The 75th Tony Awards, hosted by Ariana DeBose, air on CBS and Paramount+ from Radio City Music Hall, and are broadcast live coast to coast for the first time.	
14	Major League Soccer announces a 10-year deal, beginning with its 2023 season, with Apple, Inc. that will see the tech giant own all global TV rights to MLS and Leagues Cup matches as well as ancillary content on Apple TV+ through a league-based streaming app. Though non-exclusive rights would be granted to linear broadcasters (see December 13 entry), the minimum $250 million/year deal with Apple marks the first time a major U.S. sports league has awarded its TV rights exclusively to a digital media company.	
16	The U.S. Capitol Police arrests seven members of a film crew from The Late Show with Stephen Colbert, among them Robert Smigel, reprising his Triumph the Insult Comic Dog character. The crew (who would be later released, with all charges dropped against them on July 18) was at a congressional office building to film footage for a Late Show segment about the January 6 Capitol attack hearings; though Capitol Police say the crew was unescorted without Congressional ID and had been asked to leave the building earlier in the day, CBS says in a statement that they were previously authorized to conduct pre-arranged interviews, and stayed behind to film stand-up footage for the segment.	
17	Vince McMahon agrees to relinquish his duties as CEO and chairman of WWE; daughter Stephanie McMahon becomes the company's interim CEO/chair, but would permanently take those titles at Vince's July 22 retirement (with Triple H taking on the Head of Creative title Vince had still retained). A misconduct investigation by the WWE board is the reason for the elder McMahon's departure, with reports indicating that he had paid more than $12 million over a 16-year period to four former WWE employees, an effort to keep suppressed allegations of acts of sexual misconduct and adulterous relationships between McMahon and the women. McMahon, who would remain WWE's largest shareholder, returned to the company as executive chairman through a January 2023 shakeup of its board of directors.	
18	Production is suspended on Netflix's The Chosen One following an auto accident that killed two actors and injured six other cast and crew. The series, adapted from Mark Millar's American Jesus comic book series, had been filming in Mexico, and the accident occurred during travel from Santa Rosalía to a local airport.	
23	VH1 cuts ties with Black Ink Crew: New York cast member Caesar Emanuel after video surfaces of him abusing a dog. Emanuel had been part of the reality show since its premiere in 2013, and VH1's statement suggests his firing may not impact its 10th season, which is close to wrapping production.	
24	The 49th Daytime Emmy Awards, co-hosted by Entertainment Tonight anchors Kevin Frazier and Nischelle Turner, air on CBS from the Pasadena Civic Auditorium, with notable series winners including General Hospital (Outstanding Drama Series), Jeopardy! (Outstanding Game Show), and The Kelly Clarkson Show (Outstanding Talk Show Entertainment), and individual winners including The Young and the Restless' Mishael Morgan (the first Black woman to win Outstanding Lead Drama Series Actress) and Days of Our Lives veteran John Aniston (Lifetime Achievement Award). This ceremony is the first affected by a major Daytime/Primetime Emmy realignment where, in response to the growth of streaming television, the two ceremonies' scopes now revolve more around factors such as a show's theme, format, and style, instead of strictly dayparts (talk shows, for instance, are now generally divided between the ceremonies based on common formats).	
26	The 22nd BET Awards are held with Taraji P. Henson hosting.	
27	MSNBC announces that Alex Wagner will become the permanent host in the Tuesday-Friday 9:00 p.m. ET timeslot relinquished by Rachel Maddow (see April 11 entry). Alex Wagner Tonight debuted on August 16, which replaced the MSNBC Prime guest host rotation in place from the beginning of May to mid August.	

== July ==
Date	Event	Source
6	Cheerleading coach and Cheer star Jerry Harris is sentenced to 12 years in federal prison, followed by eight years of court-supervised probation, for soliciting sex from minors and production of child pornography. He had been arrested in September 2020 and pled guilty in February.	
9	After appearing disoriented and slurring her speech during that day's 6:00 p.m. newscast, WRGB/Schenectady suspends weekend anchor Heather Kovar, who cites exhaustion and sleep deprivation (from a recent bereavement leave, and working both weekend morning and evening shifts at the Sinclair-owned CBS affiliate due to staffing vacancies) as contributors to her performance during the broadcast. (The day prior, Kovar had informed management that she would be leaving WRGB when her contract expires on July 31.)	
11	Nexstar Media Group's Washington duopoly of WDVM (Ind.) and WDCW (CW) launches a joint news operation—branded as "D.C. News Now"—utilizing WDVM's existing news staff to present the expanded broadcasts. WDVM began producing a 10:00 p.m. newscast for WDCW (debuting on July 25 as its first prime time newscast since a prior effort produced by former sister station WTVR/Richmond from 2016 to 2018; WDVM's existing 10:00 newscast moved to 9:00 as a result), along with extending its weekday morning newscast by one hour (to 3 1/2 hours) and adding a new nightly 11:00 p.m. sports discussion show (replacing a Northern Virginia-focused late newscast). The expansion of WDVM's news production to WDCW—which Nexstar acquired through its 2019 purchase of Tribune Media—follows the physical expansion of the latter's Glover Park facility to accommodate WDVM's news operations and offices. (WDVM's former Hagerstown studio was converted into a news bureau, joining those in Frederick, Maryland, and Chantilly, Virginia.)	
11	In an agreement with federal prosecutors for New York's Southern District, Real Housewives of Salt Lake City star Jen Shah pleads guilty to a wire fraud conspiracy charge for her involvement in a nationwide telemarketing scheme, one that sold (and refused refunds on purchases for) various "essentially non-existent" services and targeted senior citizens and the computer illiterate. Shah had initially pleaded not guilty to wire fraud and money laundering charges in March 2021. As a result of her plea change, Shah would be sentenced in January 2023 to 6 1/2 years in prison and ordered to pay $6.5 million in forfeitures and $6.64 million in restitution.	
14	The Los Angeles Police Department arrests Eric Weinberg on multiple charges of sexual assault and rape, and hold him on $3.2 million bail, pending arraignment. Weinberg, a writer/producer whose television credits include Scrubs, Veronica's Closet, Californication and Graves, is alleged to have lured at least five women (who were in their 20s and 30s when the incidents occurred between 2012 and 2019) to his Los Feliz residence under the premise that he was a photographer and wanted to conduct photo shoots with them. After being charged on 18 felony counts (including rape, sexual battery by restraint, false imprisonment by use of violence, and attempted forcible penetration with a foreign object), Weinberg was arrested on October 4 and subsequently released on a $5 million bond; he is scheduled to be arraigned on October 25.	
15	Alfonso Ribeiro is named co-host of Dancing with the Stars effective with its 31st season in the fall (coinciding with the dance competition series' move to Disney+ from ABC), alongside returning host Tyra Banks. The Season 19 winner and former Fresh Prince of Bel-Air star will continue as host of ABC's America's Funniest Home Videos while moonlighting on DWTS, as Ribiero's AFV predecessor Tom Bergeron had done from 2005 to 2015.	
16	In a bumper graphic during Fox Sports' telecast of a prime time Boston Red Sox–New York Yankees game, the logos of both Major League Baseball teams are placed within the reflecting pools at the National September 11 Memorial & Museum, which sit at the exact location where the towers of the original World Trade Center had stood. After receiving backlash on social media, the network apologized for "poor judgment on the use of a graphic."	
18	CBS News and Stations launches "hybrid, local-to-national multiplatform" prime time newscasts—under the "Now" brand—on 10 of the group's CW, MyNetworkTV and independent stations. The broadcasts include new and relaunched locally originated broadcasts on WLNY/Riverhead–New York City (produced by WCBS), WSBK/Boston (produced by WBZ), WPSG/Philadelphia (produced by KYW), KTXA/Dallas–Fort Worth (produced by KTVT), WBFS/Miami (produced by WFOR) and KBCW/San Francisco (produced by KPIX) as well as outsourced newscasts on four CW stations without an in-house news department (WUPA/Atlanta, WKBD/Detroit, KSTW/Seattle–Tacoma and WTOG/Tampa) incorporating local segments produced by either KPIX or KTVT, with reporters based at each station's facility. (The KSTW broadcast is the station's first news effort since the 2005 cancellation of a KIRO-produced 10:00 newscast; KSTW previously maintained an in-house news operation from 1953 to 1998.) National segments for all Now broadcasts originate from WCBS's New York studios.	
19	Johnny Pizarro, a freelancer for the Broadway Stage Company who was assigned to conduct parking enforcement for Law & Order: Organized Crime, is fatally shot three times in the face and neck by an unknown assailant while sitting in his car in Brooklyn's Greenpoint neighborhood, where scenes from an upcoming third-season episode of the NBC drama were scheduled to be filmed that day. Pizarro was pronounced dead upon arrival at Woodhull Hospital. Universal Television—which produces the Law & Order spin-off—stated it is cooperating with police to find the suspect, who remains at large.	
20	Allen Media Group receives approval from the U.S. Bankruptcy Court for the Northern District of Florida to acquire Black News Channel—which filed for Chapter 11 bankruptcy on March 28—from majority shareholder Shahid Khan for $11 million. The company wound down BNC's operations on August 1, with its linear pay television carriage and transponder slot integrated into its existing OTA multicast network TheGrio (see BNC's closure entry in the "Networks and Services" section for further details).	
20	The 2022 ESPY Awards are aired from the Dolby Theatre on ABC with Stephen Curry hosting.	
22	During a Weather Channel Local on the 8s segment shown that evening over Mediacom's Des Moines system, the introductory message screen inadvertently included a racial slur, reading "Hello Des Moines, This is your weather my Niggers." (The message was circulated on Twitter via a screenshot posted by a local journalist with the offending slur—added onto one of the IntelliStar's default LOT8s greetings—partially censored.) Allen Media Group, TWC's Black-owned parent company, apologized for the incident (which originated not with the company, but, as programming and maintenance of TWC's WeatherStar systems is mainly conducted at the local system level, at Mediacom's headend operations), and stated it would investigate how the message made it on-air.	
29	NBC legal correspondent Pete Williams known for covering the Supreme Court and the Justice Department retires.	

== August ==
Date	Event	Source
4	Following earlier indications by company management of a consolidation of its two major streaming services, Warner Bros. Discovery announces it will combine HBO Max and Discovery+ into a single, yet-to-be-named service in mid-2023. Citing HBO Max's technical issues since its May 2020 rollout (as it runs on the infrastructure originally used for predecessor services HBO Go and HBO Now, which was designed to support the even smaller content selection and technical demands of HBO Max), the combined offering will run on Discovery+'s existing app infrastructure and utilize that service's technical operations. The planned merger later results in the removal of 36 titles from HBO Max plus all films in the Harry Potter film series and nearly 200 episodes of children's series Sesame Street. The plans to fully merge the services is abandoned in February 2023, leaving Discovery+ alone as a standalone service. However, the programming changes will not be undone as a direct result, and rebranding HBO Max is still planned.	
7	With CBS Sports' final broadcast of the 2021–22 season, Nick Faldo resigned after 16 years as lead analyst for the network's PGA Tour golf coverage. Trevor Immelman will succeed Faldo in 2023.	
10	As part of their shift from "time-based" to "genre-based" awards (see June 24 and September 12 entries), the National Academy of Television Arts and Sciences and the Academy of Television Arts & Sciences announce that Emmy Award categories for game shows will move from the former organization's Daytime Emmy Awards to the latter's Primetime Emmy Awards, effective with the 75th Primetime Emmys in 2023.	
11	During that night's edition of The Late Show, host Stephen Colbert announces that Jon Batiste has departed as the CBS late-night program's bandleader, a decision made by the Oscar and Grammy Award winner so he could pursue other projects. The band's guitarist Louis Cato, who assumed the role of bandleader during the summer, was announced as the new permanent leader of the rechristened Late Show Band, which had been known as Stay Human under Batiste's leadership.	
15	Nexstar Media Group announces it will acquire a 75% controlling interest in The CW from Paramount Global and Warner Bros. Discovery, which will each retain 12.5% shares in the network in exchange for Nexstar assuming $100 million in losses incurred by its original co-parents. Nexstar, which would close its purchase on October 3, plans to reduce The CW's operating costs, intending to make the network profitable by 2025, and acquire programming of broader appeal to viewers outside of its existing 18–34 target demographic; it will also allow Paramount and WBD to continue producing scripted programs for The CW, with the option of extending the content deal past the 2022–23 season.	
18	The Big Ten Conference announces new deals (their total sum reportedly surpassing $7 billion) with Fox Sports, CBS Sports, and NBC Sports that will see those networks, beginning in the 2023–24 academic year, share rights to Big Ten football and men's basketball games, most notably the creation of a football triple-header among the networks and exclusive broadcasts of select football games on NBC's Peacock streaming service. The additions of NBC and CBS to the Big Ten broadcast mix, alongside incumbent Fox, means the end of a long-standing agreement between the conference and ESPN, which balked at the estimated $380 million price tag to retain a share of the rights, and will, barring a possible sublicense agreement, part ways after the 2022–23 athletic season with the conference it had broadcast rights to since 1982 (corporate sibling ABC's relationship with the conference dates back to 1966).	
22	Star Jones takes over as presiding judge/arbiter of Divorce Court, as the series begins the 24th season of its current syndicated iteration (and its 40th season overall); she succeeds Faith Jenkins, who became the show's arbitrator in September 2020. It marks a return to the syndicated court show genre for the lawyer, legal analyst and original co-host of ABC's The View: Jones was herself the first African-American court show arbiter, as judge for the 1994–95 series Jones & Jury.	
23	Monumental Sports & Entertainment, already a 33% owner of NBC Sports Washington, announces it will buy the remainder of the regional sports network from NBCUniversal, with NBCU providing transitional corporate, technical, and distribution support for up to 18 months after the sale is completed (expected by the end of September). A rebrand to Monumental is expected for the network, which already carries broadcasts of the NHL's Washington Capitals and NBA's Washington Wizards, both Monumental-owned teams.	
25	FanDuel Group announces plans to rebrand TVG Network as FanDuel TV in September to complement the company's sports betting initiatives. Kay Adams, the former anchor of Good Morning Football on NFL Network, will headline programming with a daily talk show, while Pat McAfee and The Ringer contribute additional content. Live horse racing will remain a key part of the network's lineup, with coverage of basketball from Australia, China, France, and Germany joining it.	
26	Production for the upcoming Apple TV+ series Lady in the Lake is temporarily halted after on-location producers and crew in downtown Baltimore are approached by a group threatening violence unless they receive a $50,000 extortion payment. The producers report the incident to the Baltimore Police Department and seek out a new filming location with increased security.	
28	The 2022 MTV Video Music Awards air on MTV and its related digital and linear platforms. Originating from Newark's Prudential Center, Taylor Swift won three awards (including Video of the Year) for the short film of her song All Too Well, becoming the first person to win this award three times. Jack Harlow won the most awards with four and co-hosted the show with LL Cool J and Video Vanguard Award recipient Nicki Minaj.	

== September ==
Date	Event	Source
3	KJRH/Tulsa weekend morning anchor Julie Chin suffers the early stages of a stroke during the Scripps-owned NBC affiliate's Saturday morning newscast, while presenting a story about an event being held that weekend at the Tulsa Air and Space Museum & Planetarium. Chin—who experienced partial loss of vision in one eye that impaired her ability to view the teleprompter, garbled speech and numbness in one of her arms—said in a Facebook post that she had no indicative symptoms before the broadcast; she is expected to recover.	
6	Zerlina Maxwell announces she will depart MSNBC following the end of her Peacock show on September 15. Last month, the network announced that it would cancel both Maxwell and Ayman Mohyeldin's streaming programs. At that time, the network said that it wanted Maxwell to continue as an analyst while Mohyeldin would continue his weekend show as well as a fill-in anchor on weekdays.	
7	Dish Network removes Game Show Network from the lineups of its namesake satellite service and vMVPD provider Sling TV after failing to reach a renewal agreement with network parent Sony Pictures Television. The network returned to Dish and Sling on September 27, after Sony and Dish reached a new carriage agreement.	
8	Buckingham Palace announces the death of Queen Elizabeth II. When her death is announced at 18:30 BST (13:30 EST and 10:30 PST), the three major broadcast networks break into programming (GMA3: What You Need to Know on ABC, The Bold and the Beautiful's opening credits on CBS and the penultimate daytime episode of Days of Our Lives on NBC) to provide coverage, along with all major cable news networks (including CNN, MSNBC, and Fox News).	
9	Days of Our Lives airs for the final time on NBC after 57 years, with the episode's final moments being interrupted in some markets in the Eastern and Central Time Zones by NBC News' coverage of King Charles III's first official speech as the United Kingdom's reigning monarch. With Days' move to NBCUniversal-owned Peacock on September 12, NBC becomes the first Big Three network to cease offering serials or any other entertainment programming within its daytime lineup (a first for NBC since it commenced regular weekday daytime programming in 1949); it fills the schedule void with a new one-hour midday newscast, NBC News Daily (which is also simulcast on NBC News Now).	(Note: With its move to the streaming service, first-run episodes of Days of Our Lives—which had been available to its free and paid users as an NBC program—will be paywalled to subscribers of Peacock's premium tiers. Days will become only the third soap opera to move from broadcast to streaming (following the short-lived revivals of All My Children and One Life to Live—which ended their linear runs on ABC in September 2011 and January 2012, respectively—on Hulu in 2013), and its departure from NBC leaves CBS's The Young and the Restless and The Bold and the Beautiful, and ABC's General Hospital as the only remaining soap operas carried on U.S. broadcast television.)
11	Shannon Bream becomes the new permanent moderator of Fox News Sunday, occupying the role Chris Wallace vacated when he left Fox News in December 2021 to join CNN. (A series of guest hosts had filled in on the Fox network political talk show since Wallace's departure.) Bream, who retains her duties as chief legal correspondent for Fox News, moves over to Fox News Sunday from the host role at Fox News Channel's Fox News @ Night.	
12	The 74th Primetime Emmy Awards air on NBC, with Kenan Thompson as host. The first Primetime Emmy ceremony (and the second Emmy ceremony overall after the June 24 Daytime Emmys) to focus toward themes, format, and style, instead of strictly dayparts, these Primetime Emmys featured Outstanding Series wins for Succession (Outstanding Drama Series), Ted Lasso (Outstanding Comedy Series), and The White Lotus (Outstanding Limited or Anthology Series). Other noteworthy wins include Squid Game's Lee Jung-jae for Outstanding Lead Actor in a Drama Series and Hwang Dong-hyuk for Outstanding Directing for a Drama Series (Squid Game was the first non-English series to earn Primetime Emmy nominations); and Abbott Elementary's Sheryl Lee Ralph for Outstanding Supporting Actress in a Comedy Series, becoming the second Black female to win in the category (after 227's Jackée Harry in 1987).	
14	Production on a Season 11 episode of Chicago Fire is temporarily halted after a suspect fired his gun several times near the location of a scene being filmed on Chicago's West Side (near the Oak Park city limits). No one involved with the production of the NBC drama series was injured.	
15	Saturday Night Live announces the hiring of new featured castmembers Marcello Hernández, Molly Kearney, Michael Longfellow, and Devon Walker for its 48th season (which debuted on October 1); Kearney makes SNL history as the show's first non-binary cast member.	
15	The Kansas City Chiefs defeat the Los Angeles Chargers, 27–24, in Amazon Prime Video's official debut as the exclusive broadcaster of Thursday Night Football, part of the streaming service's rights deal with the National Football League. While the broadcast earns praise for the pairing of veteran NFL play-by-play broadcaster Al Michaels with college football analyst Kirk Herbstreit, and for its production and graphics quality, some viewers report technological issues with the game's stream, including pixelated images and audio/video being out of sync. Nielsen estimates an average audience of 13 million viewers for the broadcast, though Amazon puts it at 15 million when factoring in its own data.	
16	A St. Louis jury convicts James "Tim" Norman on all counts of murder-for-hire and conspiracy to commit wire and mail fraud in the March 2016 killing of his nephew, Andre Montgomery. Both Norman and Montgomery were regulars on the reality series Welcome to Sweetie Pie's, which ran on OWN from 2011 to 2018.	
17	During a segment of the station's weekend morning newscast, KTLA/Los Angeles anchor Mark Mester emotionally goes off-script and apologizes, on the station's behalf, for what he calls their "cruel" and "inappropriate" handling of co-anchor Lynette Romero's abrupt departure earlier in the week. (It was later revealed that Romero would join NBC O&O KNBC in October as weekday co-anchor of its morning newscast, Today in L.A.) KTLA would suspend Mester over his actions on September 19, and would announce his dismissal from the Nexstar-owned CW affiliate on September 22.	
19	Erick Adame announces he has been terminated from his meteorologist position at New York City cable news channel NY1 after images of him performing virtual sex acts were sent to his employer. Adame, who filed a lawsuit to discover the identity of the individual who shared the visuals, apologized for what he called unprofessional conduct but would not "apologize for being openly gay or sex-positive."	
19	13 major TV networks across the United States, including all major cable news networks and the Big Three Television Networks broadcast the funeral of Queen Elizabeth II.	
20	Thirteen years after the NBA franchise's last regular local over-the-air game telecast, the Los Angeles Clippers reach an agreement with KTLA/Los Angeles to air 15 games from its 2022–23 schedule (four preseason and 11 regular season) on the Nexstar-owned CW affiliate. The sub-licensing agreement with Bally Sports SoCal, which renewed its contract with the team on October 7 and will air the remainder of its local game telecasts, includes carriage of team-related programs on KTLA and its KTLA+ streaming channel, and regional simulcasts on sister stations KSWB/San Diego, KGET/Bakersfield and KSEE/Fresno. (The team's first broadcast under the deal was a September 30 exhibition game against the Israeli National League's Maccabi Ra'anana.) KTLA previously aired live Clippers games from 1985 to 1991 and from 2002 to 2009.	
23	The ABC business reality program Shark Tank premieres its 14th season with its first-ever live episode, featuring a studio audience and online polls for home viewers.	
28	Fort Myers Broadcasting Company and affiliate company Sun Broadcasting's shared broadcasting facility in downtown Fort Myers, Florida, is inundated by storm surge flooding caused by Hurricane Ian (which made landfall in Cayo Costa earlier that day) from nearby Billy Creek. The companies' respective TV and radio properties (including FMBC-owned CBS affiliate WINK-TV and its CW-affiliated SSA partner WXCW, which is owned by Sun) were knocked off the air early that evening, after the building lost generator power; employees that remained in the building were evacuated by local firefighters later that night. WINK returned to the air on September 30 from a makeshift studio at its transmitter site north of Fort Myers Shores.	
29	Telling his audience "My time is up," Trevor Noah announces that he will be stepping down as host of The Daily Show on December 8, reportedly to focus more on his stand-up comedy and other projects. Noah makes his announcement one day after his seven-year anniversary as host of the Comedy Central satirical news/talk program (he took over from Jon Stewart on September 28, 2015).	

== October ==
Date	Event	Source
1	The Walt Disney Television suite of networks (including Disney Channel, ESPN, Freeform, FX, National Geographic, and eight ABC-owned local stations) are dropped from Dish Network and vMVPD provider Sling TV, one day after Dish and Disney fail to renew a carriage deal that expired on September 30. The networks return to Dish and Sling on October 2, after what Disney terms a "handshake agreement" to work toward a new retransmission pact between the two sides.	
3	On the day Nexstar Media Group closes its purchase of controlling interest in The CW (see August 15 entry), Mark Pedowitz announces that he would step down as The CW's chairman and CEO, departing the network after an 11 1/2-year run. Longtime media executive Dennis Miller is appointed to succeed Pedowitz as The CW's president, concurrently moving down from his seat on Nexstar's board of directors.	
3	Former U.S. president Donald Trump sues CNN for defamation, seeking $475 million in punitive damages on allegations that the network carried out a "campaign of libel and slander" against him. The lawsuit, filed in the U.S. District Court for the Southern District of Florida, asserts on-air references to Trump's allegations that the 2020 presidential election was stolen from him as the "Big Lie" drew comparisons between him and Adolf Hitler (who coined the term in his 1925 book Mein Kampf). The suit was dismissed by Judge Raag Singhal (whom Trump nominated to the court in 2019) on July 28, 2023, ruling that the network's statements was an opinion that does not "[plausibly infer] that Trump advocates the persecution and genocide of Jews or any other group of people."	
4	The 2022 BET Hip Hop Awards are held from the Cobb Energy Performing Arts Centre.	
11	Warner Bros. Discovery announces the layoffs of 125 employees (totaling 26% of personnel) within its Warner Bros. Television Group unit. The company will also combine the creative development and programming teams of Warner Horizon Unscripted Television and Telepictures, and the development and production teams of Warner Bros. Animation and Cartoon Network Studios. It also announced the shutdowns of digital short-form programming division Stage 13 and writing/directing diversity initiative Warner Bros. Television Workshop, though it reversed its decision on the latter later that day after criticism from talent and industry executives, choosing instead to move the workshops to WBD's Diversity, Equity, and Inclusion unit.	
11	After a two-year agreement with PBS Kids expires, Wildbrain again pulls the three major Peanuts television specials off linear television and makes them exclusive to Apple TV+. It is the second effort to move the specials from traditional TV to streaming, after an earlier attempt in 2020 was aborted in the face of public outcry, resulting in Apple sub-licensing the specials to PBS. As a result, A Charlie Brown Christmas will not be televised over-the-air for the first time in 57 years; the special had aired annually since its 1965 debut on CBS, ABC, or PBS.	
15	Nexstar Media Group removes 13 television stations it owns and/or operates (WPIX/New York City, WPHL/Philadelphia, WTEN–WXXA/Albany, WIVB–WNLO/Buffalo, WPRI–WNAC/Providence, WRIC/Richmond, WHTM/Harrisburg, WAVY–WVBT/Norfolk, and WDCW–WDVM/Washington, D.C.) and its news/entertainment channel NewsNation from Verizon Fios, one day after Verizon and Nexstar fail to renew their expired carriage agreement.	
20	23 stations owned by Mission Broadcasting (including WXXA/Albany, WLAJ/Lansing, KLRT–KASN/Little Rock, WTVW/Evansville, and KMSS/Shreveport) are removed from DirecTV, DirecTV Stream and U-verse TV, after the Nexstar Media Group affiliate company and DirecTV fail to renew a carriage agreement that expired the day prior. The blackout occurred nearly two weeks after DirecTV entered into a separate dispute with Nexstar-affiliated White Knight Broadcasting, which pulled WVLA/Baton Rouge and KFXK/Longview from the former's television services on October 7.	
20	Newsmax TV bans journalist Lara Logan from future appearances on the conservative news network, after an on-air rant during an October 19 interview on Eric Bolling: The Balance, in which the former CBS News correspondent and Fox Nation host pushed conspiratorial talking points associated with the far-right Q-Anon movement. Logan—who claimed she talked to a man with documents claiming he had infiltrated "the global cabal" at the United Nations—made references to the "Great Replacement" immigration theory, suggested open borders are "Satan's way of taking control of the world" through immigration, and invoked claims of blood libel. In a statement, Newsmax TV condemned Logan's statements as "reprehensible."	
22	Formula One formally announces the extension of its U.S. media rights deal with ESPN through 2025; no monetary terms are expressed in the announcement, though reports in June indicated the network agreed to pay $75–90 million annually in the new deal (an increase from the current deal's $5 million/year fee).	
30	The Big 12 Conference announces a new six-year media rights deal with ESPN and Fox Sports for $2.28 billion (an annual average of $380 million), the deal will run from the 2025–26 to the 2030–31 academic years following the end of the current deal that expires in 2024–25. ESPN will have the "A" package, for which it will get the top four picks, six of the top eight picks, eight out of the top 12 picks and twelve out of the top 20 picks for its football telecasts. It will also gain the rights to all of the conference's tournament championships including the football championship, which will remain on ABC; all other tournament championships (including the men's and women's basketball tournaments) will be televised on ESPN's linear channels, with ESPN+ retaining supplementary streaming rights to most Big 12 conference sports (including football) and ABC retaining broadcast television rights. Fox Sports will have the "B" package, which includes 26 football games on Fox and FS1, while adding a slate of men's and women's basketball games for the first time that will air on both networks.	

== November ==
Date	Event	Source
1	YouTube launches Primetime Channels, a channel store—intended to compete with similar channel platforms operated by Apple, Prime Video and Roku—offering an initial slate of 34 streaming services (including Paramount+, Showtime, Starz, Epix, AMC+ and ViX+) that can be purchased through the YouTube Movies & TV hub. Initially available only to U.S. users, the launch of Primetime Channels comes more than a month after YouTube TV began allowing users the option to subscribe to most of its premium add-ons (including a few not initially available on Primetime Channels such as HBO Max, Cinemax, MLB.tv and NBA League Pass) without signing up for the live TV service's base channel package.	(Note: YouTube TV's HBO Max add-on consists of in-app access to live feeds of the seven linear HBO channels and VOD content from the premium channel, and provider login access to the HBO Max app. (The vMVPD also offers a standalone HBO add-on without login access to HBO Max, which requires a subscription to its base channel package to purchase.))
3	Netflix launches an ad-supported version of its basic subscription plan in the U.S. and sev en inter nati onal cou ntr ies, offering an average of four to five minutes of commercials per hour that will appear before and during titles, along with upgrading the basic plan's video quality (for both its ad-supported and existing ad-free versions) from 480i SD to 720p HD. (The "Basic with Ads" plan first launched in Canada and Mexico two days prior.) Subscribers of the ad-supported plan will not initially be able to view certain movies and TV series in Netflix's catalog due to licensing restrictions preventing ads from being inserted into those titles, and will not be able to download titles for offline viewing.	
3	A change to the schedule in the 2022 World Series between the Houston Astros and Philadelphia Phillies due to rain earlier in the week leads to Game 5 being played directly opposite Amazon Prime Video's broadcast of a Thursday Night Football game featuring both cities' NFL teams (the Texans and Eagles respectively). Estimates from Nielsen Media Research show the baseball game drew an average of five million more viewers, with a share of at least 50 in both Philadelphia and Houston. Meanwhile, the football game, originally scheduled to air on the Fox O&Os in both markets (KRIV and WTXF, respectively) per NFL rules, moved to other stations. The Astros would go on to win their second World Series championship in franchise history two days later on November 5, defeating the Phillies, 4–1, in Game 6.	
4	MSNBC announces it will not renew its contract with Tiffany Cross, who has hosted the Saturday morning show The Cross Connection for the network. According to sources, there were concerns at the network, that Cross's commentary, on both her show and as a guest, did not meet the network's editorial standards. Cross has delivered pointed commentary during her show, which at times has signaled out other media hosts. Following attacks from Megyn Kelly, who called her the most "racist person on television". In response, Cross has called Kelly "the blackface expert." Her hour was replaced by rotating guest hosts under the MSNBC Reports banner, which has lasted until February 11, 2023, with Ali Velshi taking over her hours with his own program airing the following weekend as part of a scheduling revamp.	
9	The 56th Annual Country Music Association Awards air on ABC from the Bridgestone Arena in Nashville, Tennessee, with Luke Bryan and Peyton Manning as hosts. Luke Combs (who won Entertainer of the Year, and Album of the Year for Growin' Up), Cody Johnson (who won Single of the Year and Music Video of the Year for "'Til You Can't") and Lainey Wilson (who won Female Vocalist of the Year and New Artist of the Year) were the night's top winners, with two awards each. Two-time Entertainer of the Year honoree Alan Jackson received the Willie Nelson Lifetime Achievement Award.	
9	After being operated under Paramount Media Networks (and its previous iterations) and jointly managed alongside MTV since its January 1985 launch, Paramount Global shifts oversight of VH1 to BET Media Group (under the purview of BETMG CEO Scott Mills). The network has had success in recent years with reality series aimed at African-American audiences (such as Basketball Wives, Black Ink Crew and Love & Hip Hop), along with incorporating Black sitcoms from the 1990s and 2000s (such as The Fresh Prince of Bel-Air, My Wife and Kids and Martin) onto its schedule starting in the late 2010s. According to 2022 estimates by Nielsen, VH1 ranks second among U.S. cable networks in Black viewership, behind sister network BET.	
9	Two years after Sling Media discontinued the device, the Slingbox becomes obsolete as all servers powering supported models are decommissioned. Created in 2002 by brothers Blake and Jason Krikorian, the pioneering streaming device allowed users to stream live TV content out-of-home via either a pay television service's set-top box or a DVR linked to the unit; this concept led to a complaint by Major League Baseball and a 2014 lawsuit by Fox (the latter was settled in 2016, after a federal court ruled Sling technology utilized by parent Dish Network's Hopper units did not violate copyright law) that contended the device illegally transmitted their programming online.	
10	Conference USA announces a new five-year media rights deal with CBS Sports and ESPN that will run from the 2023–24 to 2028–29 academic years. CBS, as the primary rightsholder, will have right of first refusal to higher-profile football and men's and women's basketball games as well as broadcast rights to all of the conference's tournament championships; CBS and ESPN will also share rights to the conference's baseball, softball, and Olympic events. The new deal will see C-USA's football games during October shift to Tuesday and Wednesday nights to provide national exposure. All C-USA broadcasts will be exclusive to the CBS Sports Network, while ESPN, in addition to televising selected events on its linear channels, will obtain streaming rights to C-USA sports for its ESPN+ streaming service.	
11	Judy Woodruff announces she will step down as main anchor of the PBS NewsHour on December 30; she will remain with the public broadcaster as host of Judy Woodruff Presents: America at a Crossroads, a series of news specials examining America's political divisions that will air on PBS through the 2024 election cycle. Woodruff—who served as a correspondent from 1982 to 1993 and from 2006 to 2009—was appointed part-time anchor of the NewsHour in December 2009, before being promoted to co-anchor and co-managing editor alongside Gwen Ifill (as part of the first female anchor team on an American evening network newscast) in August 2013; she became sole anchor following Ifill's death from breast and endometrial cancer in November 2016. On November 16, chief correspondent Amna Nawaz and PBS News Weekend anchor/chief Washington, D.C., correspondent Geoff Bennett—both of whom will remain in their respective roles as contributors for NBC News and MSNBC—were named to succeed Woodruff on the weeknight broadcasts effective January 2, 2023; this was followed on December 8 by Supreme Court correspondent John Yang being appointed to succeed Bennett as weekend anchor effective December 31.	
12	Dish Network removes Standard General's four television stations (KLKN/Lincoln, KBSI–WDKA/Paducah–Cape Girardeau and WLNE/Providence), after the station group and satellite provider were unable to renew their expired carriage agreement.	
15	NBC News suspends Today correspondent Miguel Almaguer pending an internal investigation, following a since-retracted November 4 report—citing an unnamed source, contradicting statements by prosecutors and police that suggested Paul Pelosi, the husband of House Speaker Nancy Pelosi, did not "declare an emergency" or try to leave when police responded to the couple's San Francisco home on October 28, and walked back to suspect David DePape, who allegedly attacked Paul with a hammer. (DePape has pled not guilty to federal and state charges of attempted murder, burglary, elder abuse and assault.) Conservative media personalities cited the report, suggesting that Pelosi allegedly knew his attacker.	
16	As part of a "restructuring and realignment of leadership" in its entertainment division, CBS announces that Kelly Kahl will step down as the division's president at the end of the year, with Amy Reisenbach stepping up from her role as head of current programming to succeed him. Kahl departs after 26 years with CBS, spending much of that time developing and scheduling such shows as Survivor, CSI, and The Big Bang Theory for the network.	
20	The 50th Annual American Music Awards airs on ABC from the Microsoft Theater in Los Angeles, with Wayne Brady as host. Taylor Swift had the most wins of the night, winning all six categories for which she was nominated (including Artist of the Year), extending her existing record as the most-awarded artist in AMA history, with 40 total wins. Lionel Richie was honored with the Icon Award, and Yola was honored with the inaugural Song of Soul award.	
21	Social media personality Charli D'Amelio and her pro partner Mark Ballas are crowned champions of Season 31 of Dancing with the Stars in what marked Len Goodman's final appearance on the show's judge panel. Goodman, who announced his departure on the semifinal broadcast of November 14, had served as lead judge on the Disney+ reality competition series since its debut on ABC in 2005; he died from bone cancer, which Goodman did not disclose at the time of his departure, six months later on April 22, 2023. Cheryl Burke, who had been with the show since 2006 and announced her departure on November 20, also ended her run as a pro partner with the season finale. (Burke and her Season 31 partner, former Good Morning America meteorologist Sam Champion, were eliminated fourth on October 10.)	
22	A Robinson R44 news-gathering helicopter operated by CBS affiliate WBTV/Charlotte, North Carolina, crashes around 12:20 p.m. ET near an intersection of Interstate 77 on the city's south side. WBTV early-evening meteorologist Jason Myers and helicopter pilot Chip Tayag, who were both on board the aircraft, are killed; three other people were taken to the hospital for observation, although no vehicles were hit on that section of I-77, as Tayag maneuvered the helicopter to crash in a grassy area just off the interstate's southbound lane. An NTSB investigation would eventually reveal that a loose bolt and other improperly installed hardware caused the wreck.	
24	A late Thanksgiving afternoon (4:30 p.m. ET) National Football League game between the NFC East divisional rivals New York Giants and Dallas Cowboys attracts 42 million total viewers on Fox and its streaming platforms, breaking a record for a singular NFL regular season game (41.5 million watched a Giants/San Francisco 49ers Monday Night Football game in December 1990). Earlier on this same day, a Buffalo Bills/Detroit Lions game on CBS attracts 31.63 million viewers, itself a record for the early (12:30 p.m. ET) NFL Thanksgiving time slot.	
28	Dish Network removes 12 of Cox Media Group's 13 television stations (WSB/Atlanta, KIRO/Seattle, WFXT/Boston, WFTV–WRDQ/Orlando, WPXI/Pittsburgh, WSOC–WAXN/Charlotte, WFOX/Jacksonville, WHIO/Dayton and KLSR–KEVU/Eugene), after the satellite provider and Cox fail to agree on terms to renew their expired carriage agreement.	(Note: In the Jacksonville DMA, CBS affiliate WJAX—which Cox operates under a joint sales agreement with owner Hoffman Communications—was not involved in the dispute as it is covered by a separate carriage contract from that of virtual duopoly partner WFOX.)

== December ==
Date	Event	Source
1	CNN announces the layoffs of up to around 400 staffers (including correspondents Alison Kosik, Martin Savidge, Alex Field and Mary Ann Fox, political analyst Chris Cillizza and several paid contributors) across its worldwide operations and cuts to selected programs as part of a broader effort by parent Warner Bros. Discovery to reduce operational costs by $1.1 billion. HLN bore the brunt of the changes, cancelling the morning newscasts Morning Express and Weekend Express (which were replaced on December 6 by a simulcast of CNN This Morning and reruns of Forensic Files, with the former fulfilling contractual obligations for HLN to air a net minimum of news content per week) and terminating their Atlanta-based production teams (including longtime Express anchor Robin Meade), while reassigning the network's operations from CNN Global to WBD U.S. Networks Group. (Sister channel Investigation Discovery, which operates under the latter subdivision, will add HLN's true crime programs to its schedule.) Express's cancellation marks the end of original live news programming on HLN after 40 years: the network debuted (as CNN2) in January 1982 with a 24-hour "news wheel" format that lasted until February 2005, when rolling news coverage was confined to daytime as it debuted a nighttime block of opinion and personality-based talk shows; HLN began scaling back news content outside of mornings in 2016 as it refocused around true crime programs. CNN will also begin relying more on experts over general contributors to discuss certain topical subjects, reduce or combine staff for its daytime and weekend programs, replace the CNN International late-afternoon newscast The Global Brief with a half-hour simulcast of CNN U.S.'s The Lead, and add unscripted programming onto CNN en Español's lineup.	
5	ABC News president Kimberly Godwin notifies staffers that T. J. Holmes and Amy Robach would be temporarily pulled from their anchor duties on GMA3: What You Need to Know, with substitutes anchoring the afternoon news program in the interim (correspondents Gio Benitez and Stephanie Ramos fill in on this date's broadcast). The move comes as the network determines the impact of a romantic relationship between Holmes and Robach that was revealed in a Daily Mail exposé published on November 30; ABC News leadership called the affair between the anchors—who separated from their respective spouses, attorney Marilee Fiebig and actor Andrew Shue, in August—"an internal and external disruption" though not a violation of company policy. By the end of January, both anchors would be exiting the network entirely.	
5	Prior to this night's telecast of a home game against the Oklahoma City Thunder at State Farm Arena, veteran Atlanta Hawks play-by-play announcer Bob Rathbun experiences convulsions and briefly loses consciousness on-air while co-hosting Bally Sports Southeast's pregame show with color analyst Dominique Wilkins. Rathbun was treated by arena medical personnel for dehydration and taken to Emory University Hospital Midtown for evaluation. Hawks radio broadcaster Mike Conti would substitute for Rathbun on the regional sports network's December 7 and 9 broadcasts (against the New York Knicks and Brooklyn Nets, respectively).	
6	The 48th People's Choice Awards airs simultaneously on NBC and E! from the Barker Hangar at Santa Monica Airport, with Kenan Thompson hosting. Among television nominees, Stranger Things had the most honors with three awards each (with the Netflix series being honored as "Show of 2022" and "Sci-Fi/Fantasy Show of 2022," while co-star Noah Schnapp was named "Male TV Star of 2022"). Also with three wins each, Doctor Strange in the Multiverse of Madness had the most wins among film nominees (the film itself winning "Movie of 2022", while Elizabeth Olsen was named "Action Movie Star of 2022" and "Female Movie Star of 2022") and Taylor Swift had the most wins among the music categories (Swift herself winning "Female Artist of 2022", with "Midnights" named "Album of 2022" and "Anti-Hero" named "Music Video of 2022").	
6	Warner Bros. Discovery announces a deal with Amazon to resume selling HBO Max through Prime Video Channels starting that day; the add-on features ad-free access to the full HBO Max content library within the Prime Video app, along with live feeds of HBO's seven linear channels (which are not offered in the native HBO Max app). The agreement allows Prime Video to sell WBD's planned Max–Discovery+ combination service (see August 4 entry) when it launches in 2023. Under a deal signed in November 2020 that brought the HBO Max app to Fire tablets and Fire TV devices, Prime Video's original HBO add-on was removed in September 2021 as part of a direct-to-consumer strategy by former parent WarnerMedia that saw it shift away from selling HBO Max through third-party channel stores (resulting in those operated by Apple TV and Roku also removing their HBO add-ons) so it could control user data through its dedicated app, a move estimated to have cost HBO Max around five million subscribers.	(Note: The HBO add-on originally sold through Prime Video from December 2016 until its removal had offered in-app access to the network's VOD library content and live streams of its linear channels; authenticated log-in access to the standalone HBO Max app was also made available to subscribers of the add-on as part of a December 2020 agreement that also made the app available for download on Amazon Fire and Fire TV devices. The original add-on's addition to Prime Video Channels was part of a broader agreement reached between Time Warner and Amazon in 2016 that also allowed Prime Video subscribers to be able to purchase sister premium service Cinemax as a separate add-on.)
8	Disney+ launches an ad-supported plan that offers an average of four minutes of commercials per hour before and during most titles, with prohibitions for political and alcohol advertising, any ads during preschool-targeted programs, and ads within kids' user profiles. The "Disney+ Basic" plan costs US$7.99/month, the previous rate of the ad-free version (now known as "Disney+ Premium"), which concurrently received a US$3 price increase (along with corresponding increases for that plan's bundles with Hulu and ESPN+). However, as distribution deals do not yet cover the AVOD plan, users of the service's Roku and Windows apps could not subscribe to the "Disney+ Basic" plan and all bundles including it—among them, a standalone "duo" bundle with Hulu introduced with the ad-supported tier—at launch. The ad-supported plan will be rolled out to international markets during 2023.	
8	ABC cancels its scheduled December 14 broadcast of A Very Backstreet Holiday, a Christmas variety special starring the musical group Backstreet Boys, after a woman filed a sexual battery lawsuit accusing BSB member Nick Carter of raping her and infecting her with HPV in a February 2001 incident, when the woman was 17 and Carter (who denies the allegations) was 21.	
10–11	The 1st Children's and Family Emmy Awards are held at the Wilshire Ebell Theater in Los Angeles; JoJo Siwa hosted the Creative Arts ceremony (held on the 10th) and Jack McBrayer hosted the main ceremony (held on the 11th). Heartstopper won four of Netflix's 15 total awards (the most earned by a single linear network or streaming platform during the inaugural ceremony), including "Outstanding Young Teen Series," "Outstanding Lead Performance in a Preschool, Children's or Young Teen Program" (for Kit Connor) and "Outstanding Guest Performance in a Preschool, Children's or Young Teen Program" (for Olivia Colman); LeVar Burton received a Lifetime Achievement Award for his work on PBS's Reading Rainbow and reading advocacy efforts for children. This ceremony was created in November 2021 to account for the heavily increased quantity and quality of children's and family programming, after all dayparts for children's programming fell under NATAS jurisdiction with the previous Daytime Emmys ceremony.	
13	Major League Soccer announces a four-year deal with Fox Sports that will see Fox, FS1, and Fox Deportes simulcast 34 MLS-produced regular season broadcasts, eight playoff contests, and the MLS Cup championship game each season beginning in 2023. Fox will also share simulcast privilges on the Leagues Cup competition with Spanish language broadcaster TelevisaUnivision over the same four-year period. The deals assure that MLS will keep a presence on traditional television in the wake of its exclusive deal with Apple (see June 14 entry). It also brings to a close MLS' relationship with ESPN, which lasted from the league's first game in April 1996 through the 2022 season.	
13	PBS, in its first third-party carriage deal with a free ad-supported streaming television (FAST) service, reaches a multi-year agreement with Allen Media Group to distribute live feeds of the non-commercial public broadcaster's member stations and state/sub-regional networks, and its national children's network PBS Kids 24/7 over Local Now. Participating PBS stations will be added to the news and entertainment service's live TV platform through 2023. The deal expands upon a partnership between PBS and AMG that began on March 2, when PBS Digital Studios added its dedicated streaming network to Local Now's channel lineup. (PBS began offering live streams of its stations for free via its dedicated website and mobile app in 2020.)	
19	NFL Network indefinitely suspends analyst Willie McGinest, pending investigation into his involvement in a December 9 fight at the Delilah nightclub in West Hollywood, in which the former New England Patriots and Cleveland Browns linebacker and several of his acquaintances violently assaulted a man sitting at a nearby table. The suspension came hours after McGinest's arrest on charges of committing assault with a deadly weapon; he was released later that day on a $30,000 bond.	
21	Jim Gardner anchors WPVI-TV/Philadelphia's Action News for the final time, retiring from the ABC O&O after 46 years. Brian Taff replaced him as anchor of its 6:00 p.m. newscast the following day. Gardner joined WPVI as an assignment reporter in June 1976, and became solo anchor of the station's 6:00 and 11:00 p.m. newscasts in May 1977 (he stepped down from the latter broadcast on January 11, succeeded there by longtime anchor/reporter Rick Williams).	
21	FuboTV and Diamond Sports Group reach an agreement to resume carriage of Bally Sports's 19 regional networks on the vMVPD's base tier, ending a nearly two-year-long dispute that began in January 2020. (Hulu and YouTube TV removed the RSNs—then branded as Fox Sports Networks—ten months after they were dropped by Fubo, leaving DirecTV Stream as its only streaming distributor until the June 23 launch of the Bally Sports+ OTT service.) The deal comes amid uncertainty over Bally Sports's future, as Major League Baseball, the NBA and the NHL reportedly rejected an offer to jointly acquire the RSNs to help Diamond avoid bankruptcy (Diamond would likely seek to terminate Bally Sports's broadcast contracts, the majority of which were losing revenue, during bankruptcy proceedings) and majority owner Sinclair Broadcast Group disclosed in November that Diamond did not have enough financial resources to service its operations and $9 billion debt load beyond 2023 and had been generating cash flow at half of initial 2022 projections (with net losses of $1.2 billion and revenue of $684 million in Q3, respectively up 809% and down 10% from the year prior). Two days later, Fubo renewed a deal with Marquee Sports Network (which Sinclair co-owns with the Chicago Cubs) that would offer its national feed to subscribers outside the Chicago market.	
22	The National Football League and Google announce that the league's NFL Sunday Ticket package will move exclusively to Google-owned YouTube TV and YouTube Primetime Channels beginning with the 2023 season, making Sunday Ticket available for purchase as a standalone add-on for the first time. Reports indicate that Google will pay approximately $2 billion in annual rights fees under the initial seven-year agreement, which also extends YouTube TV's existing carriage agreements for NFL Network and NFL RedZone. The out-of-market sports package, which carries all Sunday afternoon games not telecast on a viewer's local CBS and Fox stations, had been carried on DirecTV since its launch in 1994.	
22	ABC News fires freelance producer Kristen Hentschel after an NPR report published the day prior revealed that she had been hired by Montgomery, Alabama-based political consulting firm Matrix LLC as a paid operative, using her ABC credentials on at least three occasions to conduct unflattering pieces on Florida politicians whose positions on environmental regulations went against the interests of Florida-based corporations represented by Matrix (including among others, Florida Power & Light) and surveil corporate competitors of the firm's clients (such as the Southern Company). Hentschel had been working with the news division since 2016, primarily producing stories for Good Morning America.	
31	The AMC Networks suite of linear and streaming channels (including AMC, IFC, SundanceTV, We TV, BBC America, BBC World News, and streaming networks AMC Premiere, El Gourmet and Mas Chic) are dropped from Fubo TV, as the vMVPD provider and AMC fail to renew a carriage agreement expiring on that date.	
31	Meridian, Idaho-based vMVPD provider Evoca TV shuts down, after the company unsuccessfully attempted to secure additional funding to continue operations into 2023 (including a Change.org petition launched earlier in the month aimed at pressuring Denver Nuggets and Colorado Avalanche owner Stan Kroenke, who also owns Denver-based regional sports network Altitude Sports and Entertainment, into investing in the provider). Launched in 2020 by founder/CEO Todd Achilles, Evoca TV—which operated in several markets in Arizona, Colorado, Idaho, Oregon, and Michigan—transmitted using the internet protocol-based ATSC 3.0 standard, offering a 60-channel lineup of local broadcast stations, selected cable-originated networks and RSNs over available broadcast spectrum.	
