= Fox 18 =

Fox 18 may refer to one of the following television stations in the United States affiliated with the Fox Broadcasting Company:

- KJTL in Wichita Falls, Texas
- KLJB in Davenport, Iowa
- WHIZ-DT2 in Zanesville, Ohio (though branded Fox 5)
