= NBC 18 =

NBC 18 may refer to one of the following television stations in the United States:

- WETM-TV, Elmira, New York
- WHIZ-TV, Zanesville, Ohio
- WLEX-TV, Lexington, Kentucky
