= WHIZ (AM) =

Radio station in Zanesville, Ohio

- Zanesville, Ohio; United States
- Broadcast area: Muskingum County
- Frequency: 1240 kHz
- Branding: AM 1240 The Voice

Programming
- Format: Full-service radio
- Affiliations: ABC News Radio; Westwood One

Ownership
- Owner: Marquee Broadcasting; (Marquee Broadcasting Ohio, Inc.)
- Sister stations: WHIZ-FM; WHIZ-TV; WZVL

History
- First air date: July 25, 1924 (Note: The license was granted July 8, 1924. The first broadcast was made on July 25.)
- Former call signs: WEBE (1924–1930); WALR (1930–1939)
- Former frequencies: 1280 kHz (1924–1927); 1210 kHz (1927–1941)
- Call sign meaning: "We're Here in Zanesville"

Technical information
- Licensing authority: FCC
- Facility ID: 61218
- Class: C
- Power: 1,000 watts (day); 960 watts (night)
- Transmitter coordinates: 39.9555°N 81.9835°W
- Translator: 102.3 W272EE (Zanesville)

Links
- Public license information: Public file; LMS
- Webcast: Listen live (local programming only)
- Website: www.whiznews.com/am-1240/

WHIZ (1240 AM, "The Voice") is a commercial radio station licensed to Zanesville, Ohio, United States, featuring a full service format. Owned by Marquee Broadcasting, it is the local affiliate for ABC News Radio, the Cincinnati Bengals, Cincinnati Reds, Columbus Blue Jackets and Ohio State Buckeyes radio networks, in addition to carrying ESPN Radio and Westwood One programming. WHIZ's studios are located in a combined facility with WHIZ-TV, WHIZ-FM and WZVL on Downard Road in Zanesville, while the transmitter is located to the northeast of the city's downtown. In addition to a standard analog transmission, WHIZ is relayed over low-power Zanesville translator W272EE (102.3 FM) and is available online.

Established in 1924 as WEBE in Cambridge, Ohio, the station was originally a small 10-watt operation until moving to Zanesville in 1930. The present call letters WHIZ were adopted in 1939, and the station was owned by the Littick family for 75 years as the "Southeastern Ohio Broadcasting System" (and often did business as the "WHIZ Media Group"). Under the Litticks, WHIZ built a companion television station and multiple FM radio stations.

== History ==
=== Cambridge years ===
Roy W. Waller founded WHIZ in July 1924 as sequentially assigned WEBE in Cambridge, Ohio; the first program went out from the station on July 25. The station broadcast from Waller's home on Fourth Street in that city; early programming featured music and market reports. The station continued regular broadcasts until the summer of 1926, when a lightning strike destroyed the facility. It was rebuilt at the same site and returned to operation by the end of the year.

Following the establishment of the Federal Radio Commission (FRC), stations were initially issued a series of temporary authorizations starting on May 3, 1927. The 10-watt outlet, which had broadcast on 1280 kHz, moved to 1210 kHz, but it almost did not survive to see the 1930s. As the FRC sought to clean up the congested United States airwaves and implement the Davis Amendment to balance the relationship between radio stations and population, stations were informed that if they wanted to continue operating, they needed to file a formal license application by January 15, 1928, as the first step in determining whether they met the new "public interest, convenience, or necessity" standard. On May 25, 1928, the FRC issued General Order 32, which notified 164 stations, including WEBE, that "From an examination of your application for future license it does not find that public interest, convenience, or necessity would be served by granting it." WEBE was targeted for removal, called a "bedroom" station—because it broadcast from Waller's actual bedroom—with homemade equipment that was, according to chairman Ira E. Robinson, "assembled of parts of a questionable nature". The radio commission sent WEBE an order asking it to close by August 1, 1928, but Waller successfully fought the order, noting that the small station was serving five counties with a total of 200,000 people and providing local programming of interest. The station also increased its power to 100 watts late in 1928.

=== Move to Zanesville ===
At the end of 1929, with Cambridge providing insufficient advertising revenue to pay for radio station operations, Waller applied to the FRC to move WEBE from Cambridge to Zanesville, with new studio and transmitter facilities in that city. The FRC approved in March 1930, and on May 26, WEBE in Cambridge was replaced with WALR in Zanesville. The WALR call letters, a shortening of Waller's name, were suggested to him by his bookkeeper. By July, Waller, who had been running WALR at a substantial loss, turned over operations to the Cleveland Radio Broadcasting Company, owners of WJAY in Cleveland; WJAY management also filed to construct a station in Toledo and teased the possibility of a statewide eight-station radio network.

WALR almost made a second move within several years of departing Cambridge for Zanesville. In November 1930, Waller filed to sell WALR to the Akron Broadcasting Company. That concern had been formed by Fred Ormsby to restore a second station to Akron, which had been reduced to one station when station WFJC left the air to make way for WGAR in Cleveland. Under this plan, the Cleveland Radio Broadcasting Company would operate the station for the Akron group; by the end of 1930, control of WALR was ceded back to Waller after Cleveland Radio lost $5,000 in a five month period. The proposed Akron move was hotly contested; Clayton Townes, former secretary for WJAY ousted after a receivership lawsuit, attempted to obtain a permanent injunction against any sale of the station. It also led to applications for new stations on the same frequency in Zanesville and in Cleveland, the latter with Townes as half-owner; these were designated for hearing alongside WALR's license renewal and the proposed Akron sale and move in October 1931. On December 31, 1931, the FRC denied permission for Waller to sell WALR. Instead, it was transferred to the WALR Broadcasting Corporation in 1932.

In 1934, WALR was again the subject of a proposed relocation to another city in Ohio, this time Toledo. This was originally approved by the new Federal Communications Commission (FCC) without a hearing in September; under the proposed move plans, the local staff of WALR in Zanesville was not to be retained. However, WJIM in Lansing, Michigan, protested the decision; it feared interference to its operations from the relocated outlet, noted that WJIM and WALR at Toledo would be too close together to permit both stations to broadcast at night, and suggested that WALR be made daytime-only if it were allowed to relocate. The case became controversial because the backer of the WALR/Toledo move and holder of an option to purchase stock in WALR's ownership, the Community Broadcasting Company (which also had a separate application for a station there), was supported by Fort Industry Stations, owner of competing Toledo station WSPD, and it was thought that WSPD might control the latter. The FCC denied the move in 1937 and instead allowed the Toledo company to start its own station there, WTOL, on an application filed in 1936, finding that the proposals for new stations in Toledo proper on 1200 kHz would not be subject to the same interference concerns.

=== Becoming WHIZ ===
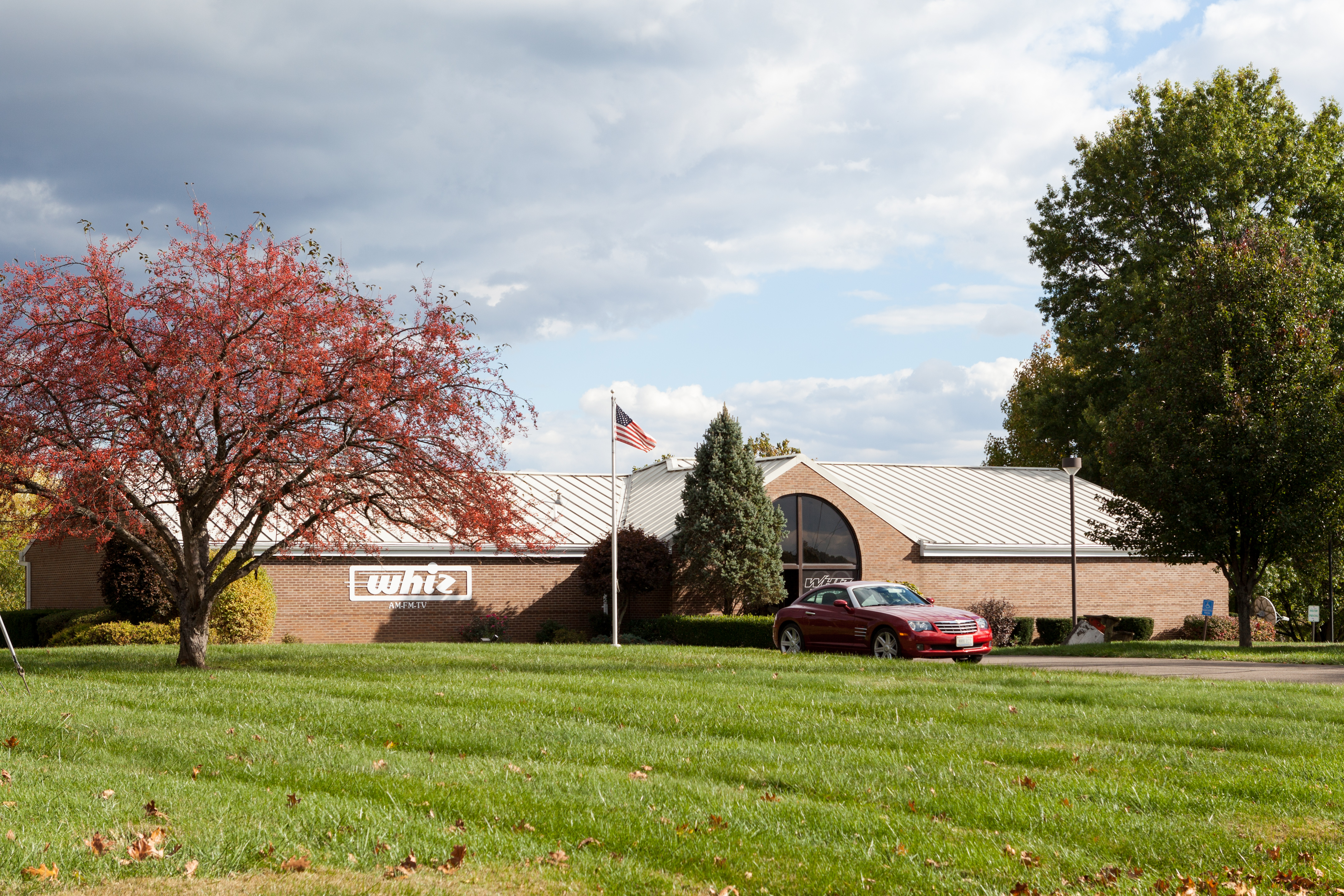
Studios for WHIZ radio and TV on Downard Road in Zanesville.

Ronald B. Woodyard, who served as general manager, president and majority stockholder of the WALR Broadcasting Corporation from 1937 to 1939, left WALR to run WSMK in Dayton. He transferred his shares in the company to the West Virginia Broadcasting Company, a subsidiary of Fort Industry. On November 19, 1939, WALR adopted its present call sign of WHIZ. New studio facilities were built in the Lind Arcade downtown, while the transmitter was relocated. WHIZ also joined NBC, having been briefly affiliated with CBS since the start of the year; it was the 180th affiliate of the network. The station was allowed to go to 250 watts in 1940, and it relocated to 1240 kHz with NARBA in 1941.

After World War II, the Littick family—then publishers of the local Times Recorder and Signal newspapers—purchased WHIZ in 1947. The sale was necessitated in order for Fort Industry to buy WJBK in Detroit, which placed the company over the seven-station ownership limit. WHIZ expanded from an AM station into a radio and television operation. Television came to southeastern Ohio on May 23, 1953, when WHIZ-TV (channel 50, later moved to 18) began broadcasting. In 1961, WHIZ-FM (102.5) began broadcasting. All three originated from the same tower, a site on Downard Road selected a year before the launch of the television station. The AM station was not neglected, increasing power to 1,000 watts in 1962. It later relocated to another site in 2003 as part of the replacement of the FM/TV mast for digital television use.

WHIZ AM-FM remained an NBC affiliate for nearly 60 years, switching to ABC News Radio in April 1999 after Westwood One (NBC Radio's corporate parent) discontinued production of hourly newscasts.

=== Sale to Marquee Broadcasting ===
In April 2022, the sale of the entire WHIZ Media Group to Marquee Broadcasting was announced after four generations of Littick family ownership. WHIZ, WHIZ-FM (92.7) (Note: This replaced the original WHIZ-FM, which relocated to Baltimore, Ohio, in 2008.) and WZVL would be Marquee's first radio properties. WHIZ president Hank Littick made the decision to sell their broadcasting assets following recent ownership consolidation throughout the television industry and selected Marquee, which operates similar small-market television stations in Bowling Green, Kentucky, and Salisbury, Maryland. The sale was completed on July 15, 2022, with Littick concurrently announcing his retirement. The original WHIZ-FM, which had been leased out to different operators starting in 2010, was retained and later sold to Educational Media Foundation on November 8, 2024, for $2 million.

== Programming ==
Brenda Larrick is the station's lead local music personality; syndicated talk show hosts include Dave Ramsey and Gary Sullivan. WHIZ also live carries play-by-play from the Cincinnati Bengals, Cincinnati Reds, Columbus Blue Jackets and Ohio State Buckeyes radio networks.

== Translator ==
WHIZ rebroadcasts its signal to the following low-power translator:

Broadcast translator for WHIZ
Call sign	Frequency	City of license	FID	ERP (W)	HAAT	Class	Transmitter coordinates	FCC info
W272EE	102.3 FM	Zanesville, Ohio	201025	250	151.12 m (496 ft)	D	39°55′42″N 81°59′7″W	LMS
