= KCWY-DT =

Television station in Casper, Wyoming

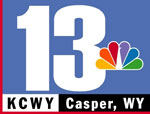

- Casper, Wyoming; United States
- Channels: Digital: 12 (VHF); Virtual: 13
- Branding: KCWY 13; Wyoming News Now; Casper News Now; Central Wyoming's CW 13.2

Programming
- Affiliations: 13.1: NBC; 13.2: CW+; for others, see § Subchannels

Ownership
- Owner: Marquee Broadcasting; (Marquee Broadcasting West, Inc.)

History
- First air date: February 21, 2001
- Former call signs: KCWY (2001–2009)
- Former channel numbers: Analog: 13 (VHF, 2001–2009)
- Former affiliations: Pax TV (2001–2003)
- Call sign meaning: Casper, Wyoming

Technical information
- Licensing authority: FCC
- Facility ID: 68713
- ERP: 3.2 kW
- HAAT: 571.5 m (1,875 ft)
- Transmitter coordinates: 42°44′37″N 106°18′26″W
- Translator(s): see § Translators

Links
- Public license information: Public file; LMS
- Website: www.wyomingnewsnow.tv

KCWY-DT (channel 13) is a television station in Casper, Wyoming, United States, affiliated with NBC and The CW Plus. Owned by Marquee Broadcasting, the station has studios on Progress Circle in Mills, Wyoming, and its transmitter is located atop Casper Mountain.

KCWY-DT serves as the NBC affiliate for most of Wyoming. The station is relayed on low-powered translator K28HL-D (channel 28) in Riverton, which is owned by the Riverton-Fremont TV Club, Inc. KCWY's programming was also simulcast on the second digital subchannel of KSGW-TV (channel 12) in Sheridan until January 1, 2019, and on KSWY-LP (channel 29) in Sheridan, KCHY-LP (channel 13) in Cheyenne and KWYM-LP (channel 14) in Laramie until July 13, 2021.

== History ==
KCWY signed on the air in February 2001 as an affiliate of the Pax TV network. On September 1, 2003, KCWY became the new NBC affiliate in the Casper market after NBC severed its affiliation with longtime affiliate KTWO-TV (channel 2). KCWY launched its first newscast (News 13 First at Five) on October 1, 2003.

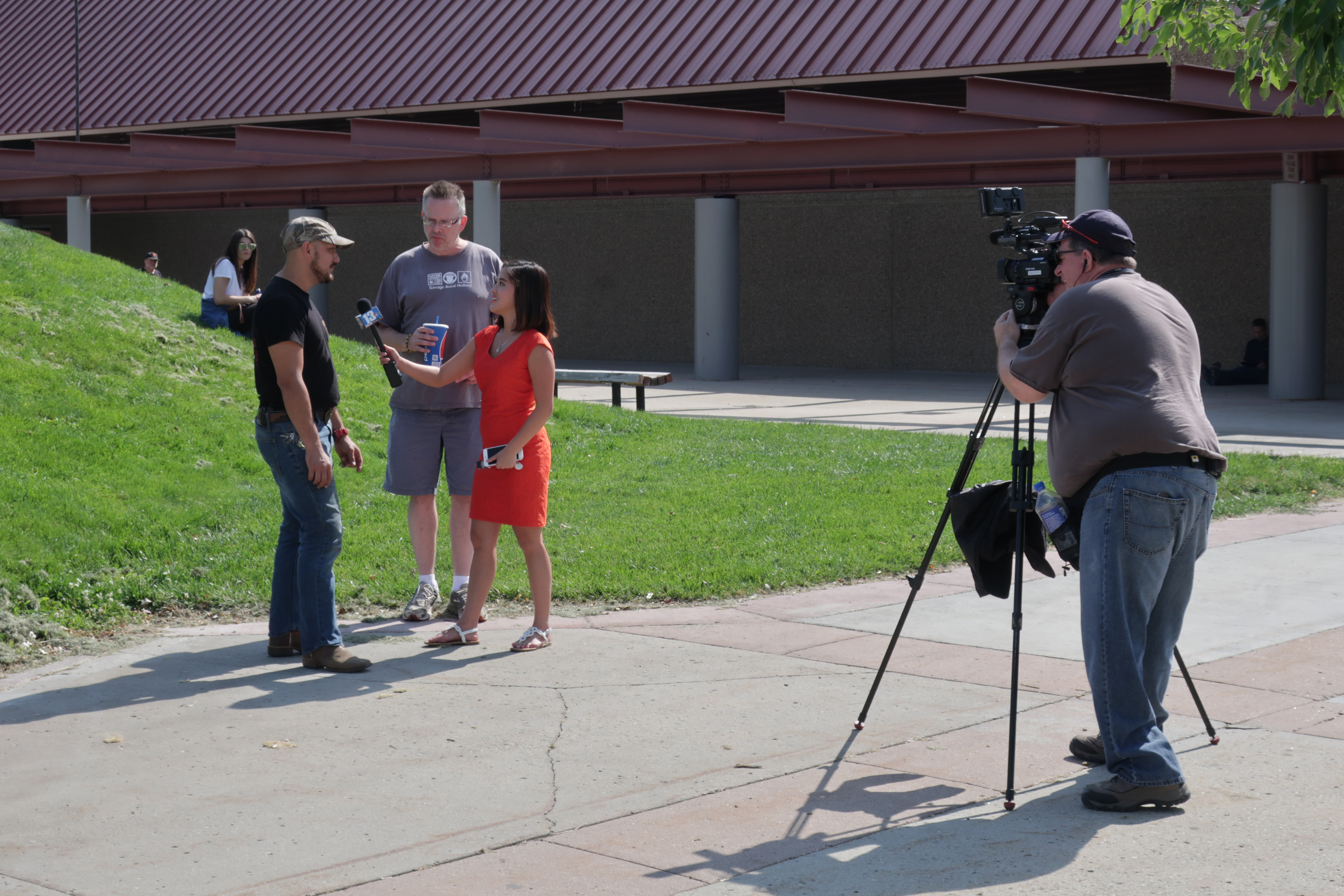
KCWY News 13 reporter Frances Lin interviews man about the total solar eclipse of August 21, 2017 at Casper Events Center in Casper, Wyoming

In 2008, 2011 and 2012, the Wyoming Association of Broadcasters named KCWY its Television Station of the Year. In June 2013, Intermountain West Communications Company filed to sell KCWY to Frontier Radio Management, through subsidiary Yellowstone Holdings; the deal made it a sister station with KGWN-TV, which SagamoreHill Broadcasting was also selling to Yellowstone through a separate deal. On November 4, 2013, Gray Television announced a deal to acquire Yellowstone Holdings for $23 million. As a result of the acquisition, KCHY-LP was consolidated with KGWN-TV. The sale was completed on December 31.

Gray launched The CW Plus on a subchannel of KCWY on January 26, 2015.

KCWY was also seen in Sheridan on KSWY-LP, analog channel 29, and then as a subchannel of KOTA-TV satellite KSGW-TV when Gray bought KOTA and its network in 2016. Sheridan is located in the Rapid City, South Dakota, television market. As a result of KNBN, that market's NBC affiliate, asserting its exclusive rights to NBC programming in Sheridan, and the network's support of KNBN in this endeavor, Gray removed the KCWY subchannel from KSGW-TV on January 1, 2019.

Logo for Casper News Now

Logo for Wyoming News Now

On January 24, 2019, Gray announced that KCWY-DT would merge its news operation with KGWN-TV by April 9, under the Wyoming News Now banner. Under this arrangement, KCWY's 5 p.m. newscast would be the only Casper-specific newscast, with Jeopardy! replacing the 6 p.m. newscast, and all other newscasts being simulcast from KGWN in Cheyenne and covering both markets. Four of KCWY's 15 news staffers were retained in Casper following the merger, with the remainder being offered positions at other Gray stations. The consolidation came after the Department of Justice (DOJ) blocked Gray's acquisition of the CBS affiliation of KGWC-TV (channel 14), which would have given Gray a second revenue stream to cover KCWY's financial losses.

On February 1, 2024, Gray Television announced it would swap KCWY-DT and KGWN-TV to Marquee Broadcasting in exchange for Marquee's construction permit for KCBU in Salt Lake City, Utah. The transaction was completed on July 1, 2024.

== Technical information ==
=== Subchannels ===
The station's digital signal is multiplexed:

Subchannels of KCWY-DT
Channel	Res.	Short name	Programming
13.1	1080i	KCWY	NBC
13.2	720p	CW+	The CW Plus
13.3	480i	StartTV	Start TV
13.4	480i	H&I TV	Heroes & Icons
13.5	480i	OUTLAW	Outlaw
13.6	480i	OXYGEN	Oxygen

=== Translators ===
- K16JI-D Casper
- K28HL-D Riverton
- K30GV-D Riverton
- KCBZ-LD 36 Casper

== See also ==
- Hawaii News Now (a similar joint news operation based in Honolulu, Hawaii)
