= WHIZ-FM =

Radio station in Ohio, United States

- South Zanesville, Ohio; United States
- Broadcast area: Zanesville, Ohio
- Frequency: 92.7 MHz
- Branding: Z92

Programming
- Format: Contemporary hit radio

Ownership
- Owner: Marquee Broadcasting; (Marquee Broadcasting Ohio, Inc.)
- Sister stations: WHIZ; WHIZ-TV; WZVL

History
- First air date: January 5, 1983
- Former call signs: WCVZ (1981–2009)
- Call sign meaning: Taken from WHIZ (AM)

Technical information
- Licensing authority: FCC
- Facility ID: 11126
- Class: B1
- ERP: 16,000 watts
- HAAT: 124 meters (407 ft)
- Transmitter coordinates: 39°42′52.00″N 82°4′10.00″W

Links
- Public license information: Public file; LMS
- Webcast: Listen live
- Website: z92radio.com

WHIZ-FM (92.7 FM) is a commercial radio station licensed to South Zanesville, Ohio, featuring a gold-based contemporary hit radio format known as "Z92". Owned by Marquee Broadcasting, WHIZ-FM's studios are located on Downard Road in Zanesville and its transmitter is located near Crooksville, Ohio. WHIZ-FM was previously broadcast on 102.5 FM.

== History ==
The 92.7 facilities, originally located at 2477 East Pike, on the east side of Zanesville, signed on January 5, 1983. It originally operated as WCVZ, a religious station owned by Christian Voice of Central Ohio.

The Christian Voice of Central Ohio had been serving Columbus and surrounding areas since 1972, with Christian programming on 104.9 WCVO-FM. Each station had an illuminated cross on the top of their broadcast tower.

WCVZ-FM programming was very similar to WCVO-FM, and featured many national Christian teaching, preaching, talk programs. These included Focus on the Family, with James Dobson, Turning Point, with Rev. David Jeremiah, Talk Back with Bob Larson, and many more. None of these were billed for their airtime, although several shared donations received from listeners.

Alongside of this programming, the staff produced local programming, including daily talk shows called "Brunch Bunch" & "Everybody's Talking". Seven days a week, a local "Prayer Line" program was broadcast, which invited listeners to share prayer needs, which would be prayed over by volunteer hosts.

Music programming consisted of a local morning drive and afternoon drive program, and the format was an eclectic mix of contemporary, praise, and southern gospel music. In a typical hour of drive time music, all three were featured in a continuous rotation. Friday evenings featured edgier youth oriented Contemporary Christian Music. Saturday evenings featured southern gospel music. Staff and volunteers produced several weekend music programs.

Several WCVZ on air hosts throughout the years include John Bouchard (Traffic Manager, Music Director) Robin (Sampson) Kelly (Morning Show, Operations, Traffic Manager), Chuck Case (Going Home Show, Traffic Manager), Neil Snelling (Office Manager, Program Director), Andy Shepherd, Austin Taylor (Program Director), Ferris Wilhite (Gospel Ship, Program Director, Engineer) and Charles Rice (Friday Night Fire host). Locally produced weekend music shows included Gospel Ship (Ferris Wilhite, Mike White), Sunday Serenade (Charlie Swank), Street Light Radio (Michael Lanning), and Yesterday in Christian Music (Chuck Case).

WCVZ was known for including children's programming on Saturday mornings. In 1994, the station began carrying "The SonShine Radio Network", which broadcast children's programming 24/7, via a subcarrier channel. Listeners could access the programming by purchasing a specially tuned receiver.

The station was also known for its "Christmas Extravaganza" that preempted most regular programming for two weeks each December. The "Extravaganza" featured many special Christmas radio productions, including vintage radio productions like "A Christmas Carol" from Campbells' Radio Playhouse.

WCVZ was underwritten by contributions from local businesses and the listening audience. Each September, "Involvathon" invited listeners to pledge gifts to provide for the station's financial needs.

In 1994, a new transmitter site was constructed in rural Rose Farm, Ohio, where it remains today. The move allowed the station to increase its ERP from 6,000 watts to 16,000 watts.

In October 2001, WCVZ was relaunched as "Joy FM". All previous programming was replaced by a 24 hour Contemporary Christian format. Michael James served as the morning show host.

On October 17, 2008, the Southeastern Ohio Broadcasting System, doing business as the WHIZ Media Group, announced the purchase of WCVZ, allowing 102.5 FM WHIZ to move out of the Zanesville area. Under a local marketing agreement, WCVZ then simulcast WHIZ-FM's adult contemporary music format in preparation for this move until December 7, 2008, when WCVZ assumed WHIZ-FM's identity as "Z92", and WHIZ-FM became "Highway 102", featuring an automated country music format.

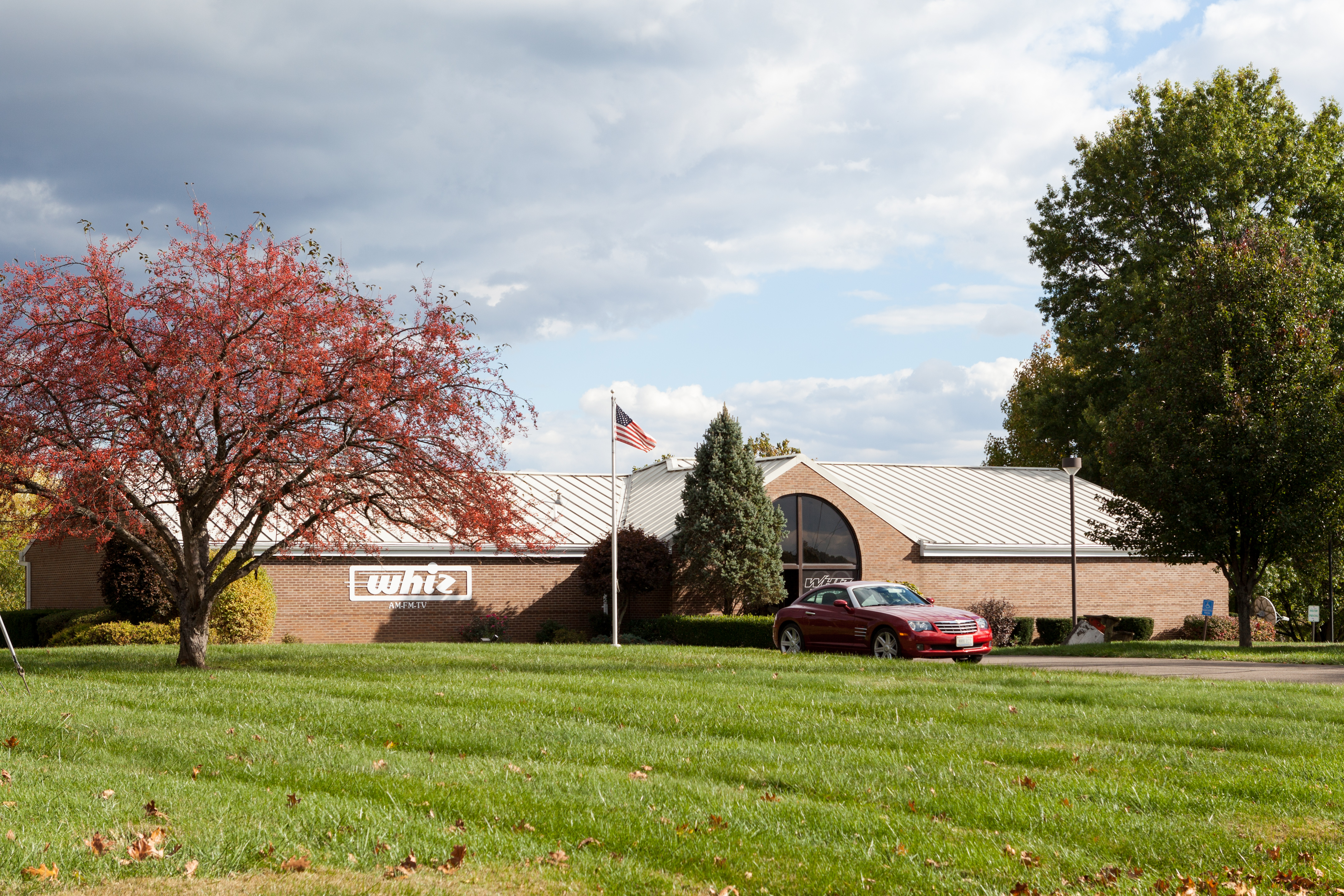
Studios on Downard Road, Zanesville, Ohio

When 102.5 FM moved to its new location serving Baltimore, Ohio, it took the WCVZ call sign from 92.7, allowing 92.7 to use the WHIZ-FM call sign.

Former owner Christian Voice of Central Ohio continues to serve the Zanesville area on WZNP (89.3 FM) licensed to Newark, Ohio, a part of the company's "River Radio Group". The WCVZ calls remained with WHIZ Media Group, and were used on 102.5 FM until December 23, 2010, when local marketing agreement operator Fun With Radio, LLC's WWCD calls were moved to the frequency.

On October 2, 2014, WHIZ-FM transitioned from a hot adult contemporary format to contemporary hit radio. The Littick family announced the sale of the WHIZ Media Group, including WHIZ-FM, to Marquee Broadcasting on April 20, 2022; the deal was completed on July 15, 2022. Once the station came under new ownership, the playlist stopped being updated, with the newest music in rotation having been released in mid-2022.
