= WZVL =

- Philo, Ohio; United States
- Broadcast area: Zanesville, Ohio
- Frequency: 103.7 MHz
- Branding: Highway 103

Programming
- Format: Country music

Ownership
- Owner: Marquee Broadcasting; (Marquee Broadcasting Ohio, Inc.)
- Sister stations: WHIZ; WHIZ-FM; WHIZ-TV

History
- First air date: August 29, 2011
- Call sign meaning: Zanesville

Technical information
- Licensing authority: FCC
- Facility ID: 183304
- Class: A
- ERP: 2,400 watts
- HAAT: 159.8 meters (524 ft)
- Transmitter coordinates: 39°55′42″N 81°59′08″W

Links
- Public license information: Public file; LMS
- Website: whiznews.com/highway-103-7/

WZVL is a country music radio station licensed to Philo, Ohio, broadcasting on 103.7 FM. WZVL serves the Zanesville area and is owned by Marquee Broadcasting.

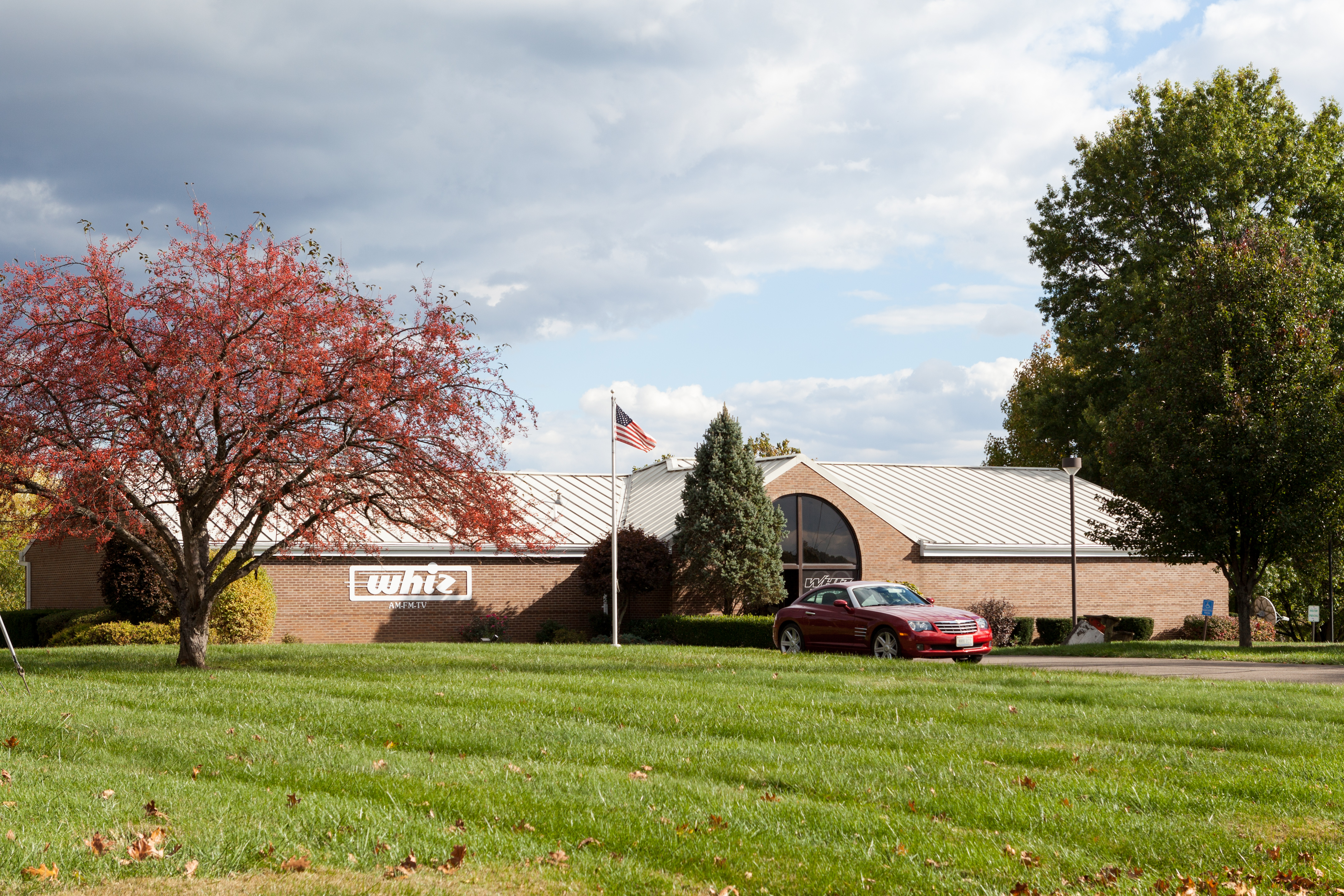
Studios on Downard Road, Zanesville, Ohio

Originally owned by Southeastern Ohio Broadcasting System, which often does business as the WHIZ Media Group, the station went on the air in August 2011; following a week of half-power operation, it formally launched on August 29. WZVL was included in Marquee Broadcasting's 2022 purchase of the WHIZ Media Group stations from the Littick family; the deal was completed on July 15, 2022.

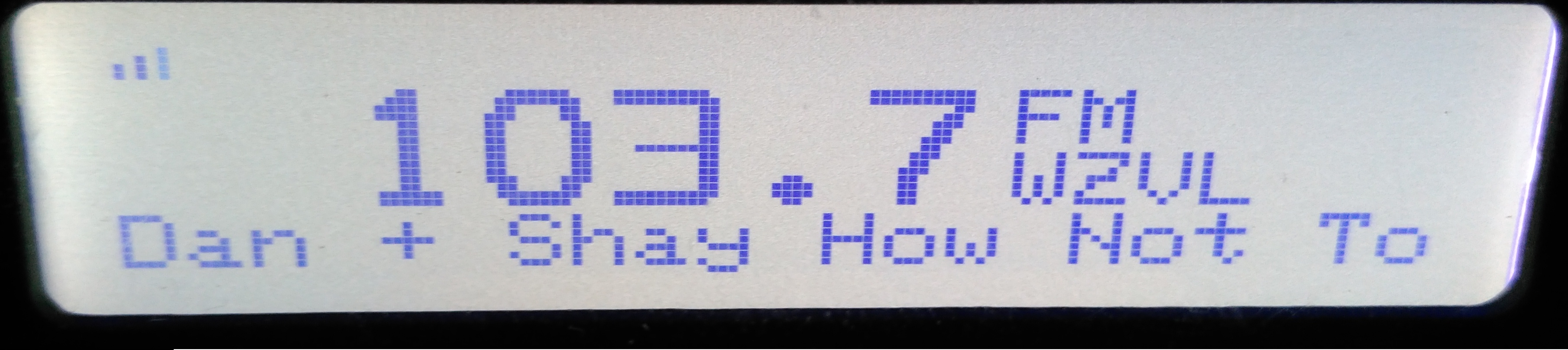
WZVL on a SPARC HD Radio with RDS.
