= WKVR (FM) =

K-Love radio station in Columbus, Ohio

Baltimore, Ohio (Note: Originally licensed to Zanesville, Ohio; moved to Baltimore in 2008.); United States
- Broadcast area: Columbus metro area
- Frequency: 102.5 MHz (HD Radio)

Programming
- Format: Christian contemporary
- Subchannels: HD2: K-Love 2000s HD3: K-Love Pop
- Network: K-Love

Ownership
- Owner: Educational Media Foundation

History
- First air date: December 16, 1961
- Former call signs: WHIZ-FM (1961–2009); WCVZ (2009–2010); WWCD (2010–2020); WWLG (2020–2024)

Technical information
- Licensing authority: FCC
- Facility ID: 61230
- Class: B1
- ERP: 15,000 watts
- HAAT: 130 meters (430 ft)
- Transmitter coordinates: 39°46′14.8″N 82°44′25.3″W

Links
- Public license information: Public file; LMS
- Website: www.klove.com

WKVR (102.5 MHz) is a noncommercial FM radio station licensed to Baltimore, Ohio, United States. Owned by the Educational Media Foundation, this station serves much of the Columbus metropolitan area as an affiliate of K-Love. WKVR's transmitter resides off Pickerington Road in Carroll; in addition to a standard analog transmission, WKVR is available online.

== History ==
=== WHIZ-FM/WCVZ (1961–2010) ===
The 102.5 MHz frequency was originally licensed to Zanesville, Ohio, and signed on as the original home to WHIZ-FM on December 16, 1961. Under the ownership of the Southeastern Ohio Broadcasting System, Inc.'s WHIZ Media Group, WHIZ-FM programmed an adult contemporary format long identified as "Z102".

The WHIZ Media Group was granted authority to change WHIZ-FM's city of license from Zanesville to Baltimore, Ohio, in the fall of 2005, and a construction permit to build a new transmitter site was granted in October 2008. On October 17, 2008, the WHIZ Media Group purchased WCVZ (92.7 FM) in South Zanesville (from which those call letters stood for the Christian Voice of Zanesville) as the new frequency for WHIZ-FM. Both WCVZ and WHIZ-FM simulcast programming as "Z102 and 92.7" until December 7, 2008, when WCVZ assumed WHIZ-FM's identity as "Z92.7", and WHIZ-FM became "Highway 102", featuring an automated country music format.

The "Highway 102" format continued on the 102.5 MHz frequency even after the station completed their relocation to Baltimore on October 1, 2008, and assumed the WCVZ call letters, while the 92.7 MHz frequency became WHIZ-FM. What was now WCVZ effectively ended any connection to the Zanesville region and consequently entered the Columbus market. As a result of this move-in as "Highway 102", the station became one of four country music radio outlets in Columbus – WHOK-FM, WCOL-FM and WNKK being the other stations.

=== 2010 "frequency shift" ===
Former CD101 logo, continued to be utilized by WWCD after adopting the "CD101 @ 102.5" brand

On June 30, 2010, Ohio State University's WOSU Public Media announced a $4.8 million purchase of WWCD (101.1 FM) from Fun With Radio, LLC.; at the same time, Fun With Radio entered into a local marketing agreement with the WHIZ Media Group to take over programming on the 102.5 MHz frequency immediately, with a future option for purchase. Although generally reported and regarded as a "frequency shift", Fun With Radio took over programming and operations of WCVZ; changed the station's format from country music to alternative rock as a direct simulcast of WWCD (101.1 FM); and rebranded the station as CD101 @ 102.5.

WOSU Public Media's purchase of WWCD (101.1 FM) was consummated that December 14, with WOSU Public Media changing WWCD's callsign to WOSA; and changing the station's format to classical music. WCVZ's callsign was concurrently changed to WWCD; Fun With Radio retained all of WWCD (101.1 FM)'s respective on- and off-air staff. In effect, this new WWCD licensed to Baltimore became the successor to the previous WWCD (101.1 FM) licensed to Grove City.

For some time, WWCD continued to use the anachronistic "CD101" brand over the air, online and in print, even though the terms of the sale with Ohio State University clearly dictated that WWCD must cease any and all on-air mentions of "101" or "101.1" when the deal closed. Several days before the initial sale with WOSU Public Media was announced, Fun With Radio, LLC registered the domain names CD101at1025.com and CD1025.com, which originally acted as redirectors to CD101.com; following the station rebranding to CD102.5 in 2012, the website was moved to the CD1025.com domain.

=== WWCD (2010–2020) ===
Logo as "CD102.5"

In November 2011, amid weeks of speculation that Salem Communications was negotiating to either purchase or lease the 102.5 FM frequency as a new location for the programming of WRFD, WWCD general manager Randy Malloy formed a new company, WWCD Ltd., to purchase the intellectual property of CD101 from Roger Vaughn's Fun With Radio, LLC. Vaughn retained a minority share of the new company, though all references to Fun With Radio would be removed from any station documents and promotion. The new ownership group immediately began negotiating a new lease agreement with Southeastern Ohio Broadcasting, owner of the frequency. On September 15, 2017, Randy Malloy became sole owner of WWCD, Ltd.

Former WWCD DJs include the aforementioned Davis, who helmed the afternoon shift from 1991 until his death; Mase Brazelle, the station's Program Director from 2016 until his death; Jim Ballantine, a Columbus Chill player most notable for wearing the first three-digit jersey number in professional sports history (101, in a nod to the station's frequency); and Fritz the Nite Owl, who also once hosted one of the last late night movie television programs locally produced in the United States. Fritz's show was broadcast on WCLL-CA, television channel 19, in Columbus.

The station featured "Guest DJs" once a week, where anyone has the chance of being a DJ for an hour on air. A compilation of 12-15 songs is put together by the guest, and they can play them during this hour. With COVID-19 concerns in mind, the station pivoted to "Select-a-Set" in March 2020, a newly revived program where listeners can remotely share their playlists without in-studio presence.

=== WWLG (2020–2024) ===
On October 31, 2020, "CD102.5" announced that the LMA with the WHIZ Media Group would expire at the end of the day, with programming to be moved online. WWCD Limited would subsequently lease WMYC (1580 AM and 92.9 FM) effective November 21, and WDLR (1550 AM) effective January 1, 2021, to return its "CD" alternative rock programming to the air.

At 12:01 a.m. on November 1, 102.5 FM would temporarily go dark; it signed back on about 15 minutes later with a jockless mix of rock music and legal station identification. On November 6, 2020, at 10 a.m., Urban One took over operations of WWCD via local marketing agreement and changed the format to Regional Mexican, branded as "La Grande 102.5". The station adopted the WWLG call letters on November 12.

The WWLG license was not included in the 2022 sale of the remainder of the WHIZ Media Group to Marquee Broadcasting.

=== WKVR (2024–present) ===
Urban One's LMA of WWLG would end at the end of October 2024, coinciding with a partnership with La Mega Media under which WWLA (103.1 FM) would simulcast on Urban One-owned WJYD (107.1 FM). On November 1, 102.5 would begin being leased out by Educational Media Foundation to broadcast their Christian adult contemporary brand, K-Love, under new call sign WKVR. The following week, it was reported that EMF would buy the station outright for $2,060,000.
