= Andrew Marchand =

American sportswriter

Personal information
- Nationality: American
- Born: June 13, 1974 (age 52)
- Education: Ithaca College
- Occupation: Sports Writer/Journalist
- Employer: The Athletic

Andrew Bradley Marchand (born June 13, 1974) is an American senior sports media writer for The Athletic.

== Early life ==
Marchand earned his bachelor's degree in journalism from Ithaca College.

== Career ==
He spent nine years as a reporter for the New York Post, then in 2007, he became a regular contributor to ESPN programs such as SportsCenter, Baseball Tonight, ESPNews, and ESPN New York radio broadcasts. After 11 years at ESPN, Marchand rejoined the New York Post in 2018.

In October 2021, Marchand began hosting a weekly sports media podcast with Sports Business Journal reporter John Ourand. In January 2024, Marchand announced he was joining The Athletic as a sports media reporter. Marchand and Ourand both left their sports media podcast, as Ourand began working at Puck.
