= Marquee Broadcasting =

American company

Marquee Broadcasting, Inc.
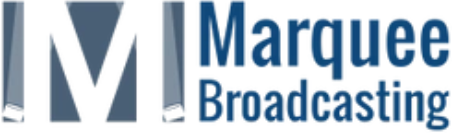
- Type: Private
- Industry: Broadcast Television; Television Production
- Founded: 2013
- Founders: Brian and Patricia Lane
- Headquarters: Salisbury, Maryland, U.S.
- Area served: United States (Nationwide)
- Products: Broadcast television
- Owners: Brian and Patricia Lane
- Website: marqueemedia.tv

Marquee Broadcasting, Inc. is an American broadcasting company that owns several television stations in the United States.

== History ==
Marquee began in 2013 when its owners, Brian and Patricia Lane, announced its intent to acquire WMDT and its repeater, WEVD-LP for $9 million.

The company's next acquisition came in 2015 when it closed its acquisition of WUGA-TV from the University of Georgia for $2.5 million. Following the acquisition, the station's primary affiliation changed to Heroes & Icons and changed its callsign to WGTA.

In May 2016, Nexstar Broadcasting Group announced its sale of KREG-TV to Marquee Broadcasting.

On April 5, 2017, Max Media announced that it entered an agreement to sell NBC affiliate WNKY in Bowling Green, Kentucky to Marquee.

On June 18, 2018, Marquee agreed to purchase WSST-TV in Cordele, Georgia from Sunbelt-South Communications, Ltd. The sale is expected to be approved by the FCC and close by the end of Fall 2018. On August 16, 2018, Gray Television announced that it would sell WSWG, the CBS affiliate for Albany, Georgia, to Marquee; Marquee intends to combine WSST and WSWG's operations.

On April 20, 2022, it was announced that Southeastern Ohio Broadcasting Corporation will sell their TV station WHIZ-TV, along with radio stations WHIZ, WHIZ-FM, and WZVL to Marquee Broadcasting for an undisclosed amount. The sale was completed on July 15.

In October and November, 2022, Marquee purchased WTLW in Lima, Ohio, a religious and local sports station, from American Christian Television Services (ACTS) and changed its call sign to WLMA. ACTS retained ownership of a low-powered translator and operates WLMA via a local marketing agreement.

On February 1, 2024, it was announced that Marquee and Gray Television had reached agreements to swap television stations in Wyoming/Nebraska and Utah. As part of the swap Marquee will end up with KCWY-DT in Casper, Wyoming, KGWN-TV in Cheyenne, Wyoming, KSTF in Scottsbluff, Nebraska, and KNEP in Sidney, Nebraska. At the same time Gray will get Marquee’s FCC permit authorizing construction of new and currently unbuilt TV station KCBU in Salt Lake City.

On January 16, 2025, the company announced that they would purchase 4 stations from Imagicomm Communications, KIEM-TV, KVIQ-LD in Eureka, California, and KFBI-LD, KMVU-DT in Medford, Oregon. This comes after earlier the same week that Imagicomm would be selling 12 of its 18 stations to other companies. On August 19, 2025, Marquee announced their acquisitions of five radio stations currently owned by Bicoastal Media Medford, KMED-FM, KRWQ, KLDZ, KIFS.

== Current stations ==
=== Television ===
Media market	State	Station	Purchased	Affiliation	Notes
Eureka	California	KIEM-TV	2025	NBC; Ion Television (DT2)	
Eureka	California	KVIQ-LD	2025	CBS	
Albany	Georgia	WFXL	2024	Fox	(Note: Owned by Sinclair Broadcast Group.)
Albany	Georgia	WSST-TV	2018	MyNetworkTV	
Albany	Georgia	WSWG	2019	CBS	
Toccoa	Georgia	WGTA	2015	MeTV	
Caldwell–Boise	Idaho	KNIN-TV	2023	Fox	
Bowling Green	Kentucky	WNKY	2017	NBC; CBS (DT2); MeTV (DT3)	
Bowling Green	Kentucky	WNKY-LD	2023	Ion Television; Ion Plus (DT2); Start TV (DT3); MeTV Toons (DT4)	
Bowling Green	Kentucky	WDNZ-LD	2023	TCN; The Nest (DT2); Estrella TV (DT3)	
Salisbury	Maryland	WMDT	2013	ABC; The CW (DT2); MeTV (DT3)	
Salisbury	Maryland	WGDV-LD	2016	WeatherNation TV	
Lima	Ohio	WLMA	2025	Religious Independent	(Note: Operated by American Christian Television Services.)
Zanesville	Ohio	WHIZ-TV	2022	NBC; Fox (DT2)	
Medford	Oregon	KMVU-DT	2025	Fox; MeTV (DT2); Ion Television (DT3)	
Medford	Oregon	KFBI-LD	2025	MyNetworkTV/H&I; Telemundo (LD2)	
Nashville	Tennessee	WNSH-LD	2021	The Country Network	
Parkersburg	West Virginia	WVMY-LD	2020	Independent	
Casper	Wyoming	KCWY-DT	2024	NBC; The CW (DT2)	
Cheyenne	Wyoming	KGWN-TV	2024	CBS; NBC (DT2); The CW (DT3)	
Cheyenne	Wyoming	KNEP	2024	NBC	
Cheyenne	Wyoming	KSTF	2024	CBS; NBC (DT2); The CW (DT3)	(Note: Satellite of KGWN-TV.)
Sheridan	Wyoming	KSWY	2025	Silent	

=== Radio ===
AM station	FM station

Media market	State	Station	Purchased	Current format
Zanesville	Ohio	WHIZ	2022	Full-service radio
Zanesville	Ohio	WHIZ-FM	2022	Contemporary hit radio
Zanesville	Ohio	WZVL	2022	Country music

== Former stations ==
Media market	State	Station	Purchased	Sold	Notes
Glenwood Springs	Colorado	KREG-TV	2017	2020	
Dover	Delaware	WEVD-LD	2013	2020	(Note: Former satellite of WMDT.) (Note: Translator for WHTM-TV; operated by Zebra Media, LLC.)
Macon	Georgia	WPGA-TV	2019	2023	
Macon	Georgia	WPGA-LD	2019	2023	
