= WHIZ-TV =

Television station in Zanesville, Ohio

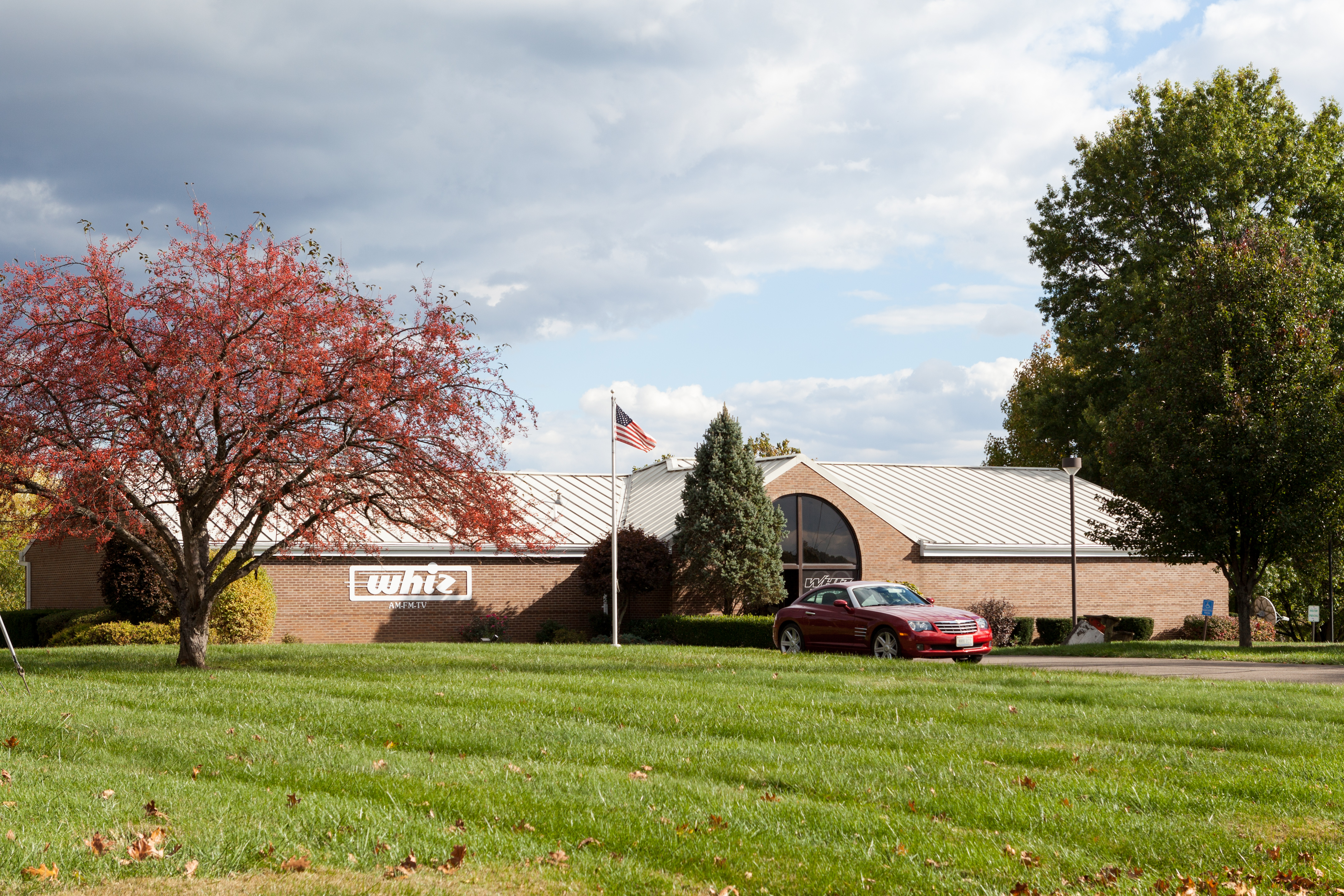
- WHIZ-TV's studios on Downard Road in Zanesville
- Zanesville, Ohio; United States
- Channels: Digital: 30 (UHF); Virtual: 18
- Branding: WHIZ-TV; Fox 5 Zanesville (18.2); MeTV Zanesville (18.3)

Programming
- Affiliations: 18.1: NBC; 18.2: Fox/MyNetworkTV; 18.3: MeTV

Ownership
- Owner: Marquee Broadcasting; (Marquee Broadcasting Ohio, Inc.)
- Sister stations: WHIZ (AM), WHIZ-FM, WZVL

History
- Founded: May 23, 1953
- Former channel numbers: Analog: 50 (UHF, 1953–1955), 18 (UHF, 1955–2008); Digital: 40 (UHF, 2002–2020)
- Former affiliations: All secondary: DuMont (1953–1955); CBS (1953–1966); ABC (1953–1966)
- Call sign meaning: "We're Here in Zanesville"

Technical information
- Licensing authority: FCC
- Facility ID: 61216
- ERP: 500 kW
- HAAT: 169 m (554 ft)
- Transmitter coordinates: 39°55′42″N 81°59′6″W

Links
- Public license information: Public file; LMS
- Website: www.whiznews.com

WHIZ-TV (channel 18) is a television station in Zanesville, Ohio, United States, affiliated with NBC, Fox and MyNetworkTV. It is owned by Marquee Broadcasting alongside the company's only radio properties—WHIZ (1240 AM), WHIZ-FM (92.7), and WZVL (103.7 FM). The four stations share studios on Downard Road in Zanesville, where WHIZ-TV's transmitter is also located.

Although this station is somewhat overshadowed by network affiliates in the nearby Columbus market such as fellow NBC affiliate WCMH-TV, WHIZ-TV provides local news to its limited local area. In addition, the station provides local sports programming, including local high school basketball games on Fridays. It is the only major commercial television station in Zanesville, with the only other local station being PBS member station WOUC-TV (Ohio University at Athens).

== History ==
WHIZ-TV's 50th Anniversary logo

Southeastern Ohio Television System, owner of WHIZ radio (1240 AM), filed for a construction permit on June 26, 1952, and was granted it on December 10.

Construction on WHIZ-TV began on December 11, 1952, at its Downard Road site. On May 23, 1953, WHIZ-TV began broadcasting on channel 50, with just enough power to reach the 500 or so television sets in the Zanesville area. A year and a half later, WHIZ-TV moved to channel 18, and increased its power output to 186 kW in addition to launching broadcast translators on channel 71 (W71AB) in Coshocton and channel 80 (W80AA) in Cambridge. In 1986, WHIZ-TV increased its power output to 589 kW with a new antenna, and introduced stereo sound.

WHIZ-TV has been a primary NBC affiliate since the station began, but until 1966 cherry-picked programming from CBS and ABC as well. It also aired some DuMont programming in the 1950s. As WHIZ is the only commercial station in the market, Charter Spectrum's Zanesville system supplements the area with the Columbus stations.

In 2002, WHIZ-TV began broadcasting in digital on channel 40.

On July 25, 2008, WHIZ was knocked off the air when its power combiner failed. While the station was able to restore its digital signal, it was determined that there was no way to restore the analog signal until early 2009. The originally scheduled digital transition date of February 17 meant that the analog transmitter would be repaired, only to be used for around 48 more days, at most. WHIZ decided not to repair it, as it was financially pointless to restore analog service, and became digital-only as of that date.

On April 20, 2022, it was announced that Salisbury, Maryland–based Marquee Broadcasting would acquire WHIZ-TV and its sister radio stations for $10.7 million; the sale was completed on July 15.

On October 24, 2022, the station announced that its second subchannel would affiliate with Fox on November 14, replacing WSYX-DT3 from Columbus on local cable and satellite systems, six days before the start of the 2022 FIFA World Cup. The subchannel brands itself as "Fox 5", in reference to its Spectrum cable position. The subchannel also carries MyNetworkTV programming as part of its weeknight late night schedule, duplicating the prime time scheduling of WSYX-DT2 (which otherwise carries The Nest as a primary affiliation and remains on market cable systems).

WSYX's main ABC channel continues to be carried on area cable systems, along with CBS affiliates WBNS-TV from Columbus and WIYE-LD from Parkersburg, West Virginia.

== Subchannels ==
The station's signal is multiplexed:

Subchannels of WHIZ-TV
Subchannel	Res.	Short name	Programming
18.1	1080i	WHIZ-TV	NBC
18.2	720p	WHIZ-DT	Fox (primary); MyNetworkTV (secondary)
18.3	480i	MeTV	MeTV

== Other stations ==
Marquee Broadcasting also owns and operates radio stations WHIZ AM, WHIZ-FM ("Z-92"), and WZVL ("Highway 103"). The WHIZ Media Group operated WCVZ ("Highway 102") prior to its replacement by what is now WKVR ("K-Love"); it continues to hold WKVR's license, even though that station moved from Zanesville to the Columbus market in 2009 and is operated by the Educational Media Foundation through a local marketing agreement.

Until early 2008, WHIZ also operated CW Plus stations in Zanesville (WBZV) and Parkersburg, West Virginia (WBPB). After their closure, it was replaced on cable lineups by WWHO in Zanesville and WQCW in Parkersburg. The CW Plus has since been reinstated on Zanesville cable lineups, now operated directly by the various cable providers serving the market.
