= List of television stations in Georgia (U.S. state) =

This is a list of broadcast television stations that are licensed in the U.S. state of Georgia.

== Full-power ==
- Stations are arranged by media market served and channel position.

Full-power television stations in Georgia
Media market	Station	Channel	Primary affiliation(s)	Notes	Refs
Albany	WXGA-TV	8	PBS	(Note: Satellite of WGTV.) (Note: Licensed to Waycross, Georgia.)	
Albany	WALB	10	NBC, ABC on 10.2, The CW on 10.4		
Albany	WABW-TV	14	PBS	(Note: Licensed to Pelham, Georgia.)	
Albany	WACS-TV	25	PBS	(Note: Licensed to Dawson, Georgia.)	
Albany	WFXL	31	Fox		
Albany	WSWG	44	CBS	(Note: Licensed to Valdosta, Georgia.)	
Albany	WSST-TV	55	MyNetworkTV	(Note: Licensed to Cordele, Georgia.)	
Atlanta	WSB-TV	2	ABC		
Atlanta	WAGA-TV	5	Fox		
Atlanta	WGTV	8	PBS		
Atlanta	WXIA-TV	11	NBC		
Atlanta	WPXA-TV	14	Ion Television	(Note: Licensed to Rome, Georgia.)	
Atlanta	WPCH-TV	17	The CW		
Atlanta	WABE-TV	30	PBS		
Atlanta	WGTA	32	MeTV	(Note: Licensed to Toccoa, Georgia.)	
Atlanta	WUVG-DT	34	Univision, UniMás on 34.2		
Atlanta	WATL	36	MyNetworkTV		
Atlanta	WANF	46	Independent, Telemundo on 47.1		
Atlanta	WATC-DT	57	Religious independent		
Atlanta	WHSG-TV	63	TBN	(Note: Licensed to Monroe, Georgia.)	
Atlanta	WUPA	69	CBS		
Augusta	WJBF	6	ABC, The CW on 6.3		
Augusta	WRDW-TV	12	CBS, NBC on 12.2, MyNetworkTV on 12.3		
Augusta	WCES-TV	20	PBS	(Note: Licensed to Wrens, Georgia.)	
Augusta	WFXG	54	Fox		
Columbus	WRBL	3	CBS		
Columbus	WTVM	9	ABC		
Columbus	WJSP-TV	28	PBS		
Columbus	WLTZ	38	NBC, The CW on 38.2, MyNetworkTV on 38.3		
Columbus	WXTX	54	Fox		
Macon	WMAZ-TV	13	CBS, The CW on 13.2		
Macon	WGXA	24	Fox, ABC on 24.2		
Macon	WMUM-TV	29	PBS	(Note: Licensed to Cochran, Georgia.)	
Macon	WMGT-TV	41	NBC, MyNetworkTV on 41.2		
Macon	WGNM	45	CTN		
Macon	WPGA-TV	58	MeTV	(Note: Licensed to Perry, Georgia.)	
Savannah	WSAV-TV	3	NBC, The CW on 3.2, MyNetworkTV on 3.3		
Savannah	WVAN-TV	9	PBS		
Savannah	WTOC-TV	11	CBS		
Savannah	WJWJ-TV	16	PBS	(Note: Satellite of WRLK-TV.) (Note: Licensed to Beaufort, South Carolina.)	
Savannah	WJCL	22	ABC		
Savannah	WSCG	34	TCT	(Note: Licensed to Baxley, Georgia.)	
~Jacksonville, FL	WPXC-TV	21	Ion Television	(Note: Licensed to Brunswick, Georgia.)	
~Tallahassee, FL	WCTV	6	CBS, MyNetworkTV on 6.6	(Note: Licensed to Thomasville, Georgia.)	
~Tallahassee, FL	WTLH	49	Heroes and Icons, The CW on 49.2	(Note: Licensed to Bainbridge, Georgia.)	
~Chattanooga, TN	WNGH-TV	18	PBS	(Note: Licensed to Chatsworth, Georgia.)	
~Chattanooga, TN	WELF-TV	23	TBN	(Note: Licensed to Dalton, Georgia.)	

== Low-power ==
Low-power television stations in Georgia
Media market	Station	Channel	Network	Notes	Refs
Albany	WDRJ-LD	26	[Blank]		
Albany	WGCW-LD	36	The CW		
Albany	WSST-LD	55	MyNetworkTV, CBS on 55.20		
Atlanta	WUVM-LD	4	Various		
Atlanta	WTBS-LD	6	France 24		
Atlanta	WEQT-LD	9	Various	(Note: Licensed to Athens, Georgia.)	
Atlanta	WDNV-LD	12	Various		
Atlanta	WZVC-LD	15	Various		
Atlanta	WYGA-CD	16	Various		
Atlanta	W20EQ-D	20	[Blank]		
Atlanta	WLVO-LD	21	Various		
Atlanta	WSKC-CD	22	MeTV Toons		
Atlanta	WGGD-LD	23	Daystar	(Note: Licensed to Gainesville, Georgia.)	
Atlanta	W26EM-D	26	[Blank]		
Atlanta	WDWW-LD	28	365BLK		
Atlanta	W29DN-D	29	[Blank]		
Atlanta	WVND-LD	31	[Blank]	(Note: Licensed to Suwanee, Georgia.)	
Atlanta	WANN-CD	32	Various		
Atlanta	WDTA-LD	35	Daystar		
Atlanta	WIGL-LD	38	TCT		
Atlanta	WIRE-CD	40	Various		
Atlanta	WTHC-LD	42	Tourist information		
Atlanta	W13DQ-D	45	Various		
Atlanta	WKTB-CD	47.2	Telemundo, TeleXitos on 47.3	(Note: Licensed to Norcross, Georgia.)	
Atlanta	WUEO-LD	49	Various	(Note: Licensed to Macon, Georgia.)	
Augusta	WAAU-LD	23	Various		
Augusta	WAGT-CD	26	NBC, The CW on 26.2		
Augusta	WGAT-LD	28	Telemundo		
Augusta	W34FO-D	34	[Blank]		
Augusta	WIEF-LD	47	3ABN		
Augusta	WBPI-CD	49	Religious independent		
Columbus	WRDP-LD	16	Various		
Columbus	WYBU-CD	16	CTN		
Columbus	WAUA-LD	23	Daystar		
Columbus	W27DK-D	27	[Blank]		
Columbus	W31EU-D	29	Various		
Columbus	WXVK-LD	30	Various		
Columbus	WCAC-LD	33	Independent	(Note: Licensed to LaGrange, Georgia.)	
Columbus	W36EO-D	36	[Blank]		
Columbus	W29FD-D	43	Various		
Macon	WDMA-CD	16	Daystar		
Macon	W19DN-D	19	[Blank]		
Macon	W20DL-D	20	[Blank]		
Macon	W32FN-D	32	[Blank]		
Macon	W34FX-D	34	Various	(Note: Licensed to Montrose, Georgia.)	
Macon	W35BB-D	35	Independent	(Note: Licensed to Dublin, Georgia.)	
Macon	WMUB-LD	38	France 24		
Macon	W28EU-D	42	Various		
Macon	WJDO-LD	44	Various		
Macon	WPGA-LD	50	Peachtree Sports Network		
Savannah	WSVG-LD	23	Various		
Savannah	WDID-LD	26	Various		
Savannah	WGCB-LD	35	Various		
Savannah	WUET-LD	43	Various		
~Tallahassee, FL	W21EL-D	21	Various		
~Tallahassee, FL	W26FJ-D	26	[Blank]		
~Tallahassee, FL	W32FK-D	32	[Blank]		

== Translators ==
Television station translators in Georgia
Media market	Station	Channel	Translating	Notes	Refs
Albany	WTSG-LD	10	WALB	(Note: Licensed to Tifton, Georgia.)	
Albany	W16EK-D	16	WALB	(Note: Licensed to Douglas, Georgia.)	
Albany	W23FN-D	23	WALB 10.5		
Albany	W25ED-D	25	WALB 10.5		
Albany	W17ES-D	44	WSWG	(Note: Licensed to Adel, Georgia.)	
Atlanta	W28EW-D	8	WGTV		
Atlanta	W23EV-D	28	WJSP-TV	(Note: Licensed to Carrollton, Georgia.)	
Atlanta	W33EU-D	33	WKTB-CD		
Augusta	W16EE-D	12	WRDW-TV		
Augusta	W16EL-D	12	WRDW-TV		
Augusta	W20EW-D	12	WRDW-TV		
Augusta	W33ER-D	12	WRDW-TV		
Augusta	W35DV-D	12	WRDW-TV		
Augusta	WDZC-LD	14	WGAT-LD		
Augusta	W24FC-D	17	WGAT-LD		
Columbus	WCTA-LD	9	WTVM		
Columbus	W19DW-D	38	WLTZ		
Columbus	W25FW-D	38	WLTZ		
Macon	WTMH-LD	21	WKTB-CD		
Savannah	WPHJ-LD	11	WTOC-TV		
Savannah	WQIX-LD	25	WPHJ-LD		
Savannah	W29EN-D	29	WRLK-TV	(Note: Licensed to Soperton, Georgia.)	
Savannah	WHDS-LD	32	WATC-DT		
~Western NC	W25FP-D	18	WNGH-TV	(Note: Licensed to Young Harris, Georgia.)	
~Tallahassee, FL	W23FI-D	23	WSWG		
~Tallahassee, FL	W33EV-D	33	WPHJ-LD		
~Tallahassee, FL	W30FA-D	30	WFXU	(Note: Licensed to Homerville, Georgia.)	
~Greenville, SC	W32FE-D	20	WCES-TV	(Note: Licensed to Hartwell and Royston, Georgia.)	

== Defunct ==
- WAGT Augusta (1968–1970, 1974–2017)
- WATL-TV Atlanta (1969–1971)
- WQXI-TV Atlanta (1954–1955)
- WETV, WNEX-TV, WOKA Macon (1953–1955)
- WROM-TV Rome (1953–1957)
- WVGA Valdosta (1980–1992)

== See also ==
- Georgia (U.S. state) § Media

== Bibliography ==
- "United States TV Stations: Georgia", Yearbook of Radio and Television, New York: Radio Television Daily, 1964, OCLC 7469377 – via Internet Archive
- Patrick Novotny (2007). "Impact of Television on Georgia, 1948-1952". Georgia Historical Quarterly. 91.
