= WFSU =

WFSU may refer to:

- WFSU-FM, a radio station (88.9 FM) licensed to Tallahassee, Florida, United States
- WFSU-TV, a television station (RF channel 32/PSIP 11) licensed to Tallahassee, Florida, United States
