= NBC Albany =

NBC Albany may refer to:

- WNYT (TV) in Albany, New York
- WALB in Albany, Georgia
