= NBC40 =

NBC 40 may refer to one of the following television stations in the United States:

== Current ==
- WNKY in Bowling Green, Kentucky
- WTWC-TV in Tallahassee, Florida

== Former ==
- WINR-TV/WICZ-TV in Binghamton, New York (1957 to 1996)
- WMGM-TV in Atlantic City, New Jersey (1966 to 2014)
