= Desert So Green =

Studio album by Winged Wheel
- Released: January 9, 2026
- Genre: Rock
- Length: 42:00
- Label: 12XU

Winged Wheel chronology
| Big Hotel (2024) | Desert So Green (2026) |

Singles from Desert So Green
- 1. "Speed Table" Released: October 17, 2025; 2. "Beautiful Holy Jewel Home" Released: November 21, 2025; 3. "I See Poseurs Every Day" Released: December 30, 2025

Desert So Green is the third studio album by American band Winged Wheel. It was released on January 9, 2026, by 12XU.

The album ranked number 19 on Tallahassee's WVFS 89.7FM radio, and appeared on BrooklynVegan's Best Albums of 2026 so far list.

== Background ==
The second single from the album, Beautiful Holy Jewel Home was announce on November 21, 2025, with the release being called a "straightforward melodic tuneage, while still remaining hazy and fragmented."

== Critical reception ==
Professional ratings
Aggregate scores
| Source | Rating |
|---|---|
| Metacritic | 79/100 |
Review scores
| Source | Rating |
| No Ripcord | (7.5/10) |
| Pitchfork | (7.2/10) |

Desert So Green was met with "generally favorable" reviews from critics. At Metacritic, which assigns a weighted average rating out of 100 to reviews from mainstream publications, this release received an average score of 79, based on 5 reviews.

David Coleman of No Ripcord gave Desert No Green a seven-and-a-half out of ten and said that the album "sophisticated experimental rock jam that flirts with no wave, kosmische, and post-rock", while noting that "its nine tracks chug along at similar tempos, and the twists and turns within each composition are subtle and smoothly executed."

=== Accolades ===
Publications' year-end list appearances for Desert So Green
| Critic/Publication | List | Rank | Ref |
|---|---|---|---|
| BrooklynVegan | BrooklynVegan's Best Albums of 2026 So Far | NA | |
| Stereogum | Album of the Week | NA | |

== Track listing ==
Track listing adapted from Apple Music.

Desert So Green track listing
| No. | Title | Length |
|---|---|---|
| 1. | "Canvas 11" | 6:00 |
| 2. | "Canvas 2" | 3:23 |
| 3. | "Speed Table" | 3:04 |
| 4. | "More Frog Poems" | 5:21 |
| 5. | "Beautiful Holy Jewel Home" | 4:47 |
| 6. | "Canvas 8" | 6:01 |
| 7. | "Bird Spells" | 3:16 |
| 8. | "I See Poseurs Every Day" | 4:40 |
| 9. | "The Suite Goes Quiet" | 4:40 |
