= ABC Albany =

ABC Albany and ABC 10 Albany may refer to:

- WTEN in Albany, New York
- WALB in Albany, Georgia
