= WATC =

WATC may refer to:

- WATC-DT, a television station licensed to serve Atlanta, Georgia, United States
- Washington Terminal Company, a railroad company in Washington, D.C. (reporting mark WATC)
- "We Are the Champions" a 1977 Queen Song
- Weekend All Things Considered, U.S. weekend news program from National Public Radio
- Western Arkansas Technical Center, at the University of Arkansas
- Western Australian Theatre Company, a theatre company in Perth from 1985 to 1990
- Western Australian Turf Club, Thoroughbred racing club of WA
- Wichita Area Technical College, former name of Wichita State University Campus of Applied Sciences and Technology
