= WTLF =

Television station in Tallahassee, Florida

- Tallahassee, Florida; Thomasville–Valdosta, Georgia; United States
- City: Tallahassee, Florida
- Channels: Digital: 24 (UHF); Virtual: 24
- Branding: Tallahassee CW 24.1

Programming
- Affiliations: 24.1: The CW Plus; for others, see § Subchannels

Ownership
- Owner: Sinclair Broadcast Group; (WTWC Licensee, LLC)
- Sister stations: WTWC-TV, WTLH

History
- Founded: June 1, 2000
- First air date: May 7, 2003
- Former affiliations: As a satellite of WFXU: UPN (2003–2005); The WB 100+ (2005–2006)
- Call sign meaning: Tallahassee, Florida

Technical information
- Licensing authority: FCC
- Facility ID: 82735
- ERP: 1,000 kW
- HAAT: 510 m (1,673 ft)
- Transmitter coordinates: 30°40′50.3″N 83°58′20.6″W
- Translator(s): WTLH 49.2 Bainbridge, GA

Links
- Public license information: Public file; LMS

WTLF (channel 24) is a television station in Tallahassee, Florida, United States, affiliated with The CW Plus. It is owned by Sinclair Broadcast Group alongside dual NBC/Fox affiliate WTWC-TV (channel 40) and operated with Bainbridge, Georgia–licensed Heroes & Icons affiliate WTLH (channel 49). The three stations share studios on Deerlake South in unincorporated Leon County, Florida, northwest of Bradfordville (with a Tallahassee postal address), and transmitter facilities in unincorporated Thomas County, Georgia, southeast of Metcalf, along the Florida state line.

== History ==
It began broadcasting operations on May 7, 2003, as a full-time satellite of UPN affiliate WFXU in Live Oak, Florida. Although that station had become Tallahassee's UPN affiliate a year earlier, its signal was not nearly strong enough to cover the entire market and WTLF was intended to make up for this shortfall in coverage.

WFXU had originally been established back in 1998 as a full-time satellite of WTLH for the same reason. WTLF was one of the first stations in the United States to sign-on as a digital-only station with no analog counterpart. Originally, this station was owned by KB Prime Media but operated by Pegasus Communications (owner of WFXU and WTLH at that time) under a local marketing agreement.

Pegasus declared bankruptcy in June 2004 over a dispute with DirecTV (then co-owned with Fox by News Corporation) over marketing of the direct broadcast satellite service to rural areas. On April 1, 2005, WFXU/WTLF switched to The WB through The WB 100+. As a result, UPN promptly signed with WCTV (channel 6) which launched a new second subchannel to carry the network. Prior to this, The WB was carried on a cable-exclusive station (with the faux calls "WBXT") which was operated and promoted by ABC affiliate WTXL-TV (channel 27) in partnership with The WB 100+.

On January 24, 2006, CBS and Time Warner announced that they were "merging" their UPN and WB networks to create The CW effective September 2006. On February 22, News Corporation announced it would start up another new network called MyNetworkTV. This new service, which would be a sister network to Fox, would be operated by Fox Television Stations and its syndication division Twentieth Television. MyNetworkTV was created in order to give UPN and WB stations, not mentioned as becoming CW affiliates, another option besides becoming independent in addition to competing against The CW.

It was announced on April 24 that WTLH would create a new second digital subchannel to become Tallahassee's CW affiliate. These plans were later modified in August to make WFXU/WTLF the primary CW affiliate with a simulcast provided on WTLH-DT2. This arrangement took effect when the network premiered on September 18 while, back on September 5, WCTV's UPN subchannel joined MyNetworkTV. The Pegasus station group was sold in August 2006 to private investment firm CP Media, LLC of Wilkes-Barre, Pennsylvania for $55.5 million. Eventually, CP Media formed a new media company, New Age Media. Around this time, KB Prime Media sold WTLF to Mystic Broadcast Group which in turn promptly sold it to MPS Media. Meanwhile, WFXU was eventually sold to Budd Broadcasting and became a separate outlet leaving WTLF and WTLH-DT2 as Tallahassee's CW affiliate.

On September 25, 2013, New Age Media announced that it would sell most of its stations to the Sinclair Broadcast Group. In order to comply with FCC ownership restrictions, since Sinclair already owned WTWC, its partner company Cunningham Broadcasting planned to acquire the WTLH license but Sinclair was slated to operate the station (as well as WTLF, which would have been acquired by another sidecar operation, Deerfield Media) through shared services agreements.

On October 31, 2014, New Age Media requested the dismissal of its application to sell WTLH; the next day, Sinclair purchased the non-license assets of WTLF and WTLH and began operating them through a master service agreement. At some point after the transaction occurred, Sinclair moved WTLH's Fox affiliation to WTWC's second subchannel. At that point, MeTV programming moved from WTLH's third digital subchannel to its main channel; the simulcast of WTLF continued on that outlet's second subchannel.

On July 28, 2021, the FCC issued a Forfeiture Order stemming from a lawsuit against MPS Media. The lawsuit, filed by AT&T, alleged that MPS Media failed to negotiate for retransmission consent in good faith for the stations. Owners of other Sinclair-managed stations, such as Deerfield Media, were also named in the lawsuit. MPS was ordered to pay a fine of $512,288.

On November 18, 2025, Sinclair announced that it would acquire WTLF outright from MPS Media, creating a legal duopoly with WTWC. The sale was completed on December 31.

== Subchannels ==
The station's signal is multiplexed:

Subchannels of WTLF
| Subchannel | Res. | Short name | Programming |
|---|---|---|---|
| 24.1 | 720p | CW | The CW Plus |
| 24.2 | 480i | Comet | Comet |
| 24.3 | 480i | ROAR | Roar |
| 24.4 | 480i | TheNest | The Nest |
| 24.5 | 480i | Antenna | Antenna TV |
