= WSST =

WSST may refer to:

- Wisconsin Society of Science Teachers
- WSST-TV, a television station (channel 34, virtual 55) licensed to serve Cordele, Georgia, United States
- WSST-LD, a low-power television station (channel 28, virtual 55) licensed to serve Albany, Georgia
