= CBS Albany =

CBS Albany may refer to:

- WRGB, in Albany, New York
- WSWG (TV), in Albany, Georgia
