= Fox 31 =

Fox 31 may refer to one of the following television stations in the United States affiliated with the Fox Broadcasting Company:

- KDVR in Denver, Colorado
- WFXL in Albany, Georgia
- WUHF in Rochester, New York
