= WFXU =

Television station in Live Oak, Florida

- Live Oak–Tallahassee, Florida; Thomasville, Georgia; United States
- City: Live Oak, Florida
- Channels: Digital: 17 (UHF); Virtual: 15, 57
- Branding: WFXU

Programming
- Affiliations: 15.1: Telemundo; 57.1: Independent with MyNetworkTV; for others, see § Subchannels

Ownership
- Owner: Gray Media; (Gray Television Licensee, LLC)
- Sister stations: WCTV

History
- First air date: June 15, 1998
- Former call signs: WFXU (1998–December 12, 2011); WTXI (December 12–19, 2011)
- Former channel numbers: Analog: 57 (UHF, 1998–2009); Digital: 48 (UHF, 2001–2020); Virtual: 48 (2001–2017)
- Former affiliations: Fox (via WTLH, 1998–2002); UPN (2002–2005); The WB+ (2005–September 2006); The CW+ (September–November 2006); Independent (November 2006–2009, October−November 2010, November−December 2011); Dark (2009−October 2010, November 2010−November 2011, December 2011−2013); Soul of the South (2013−2016); Retro TV (2016−2018); MyNetworkTV (secondary, 2018–2022); MeTV (2018–2025, now on 57.2)
- Call sign meaning: Fox UHF (former affiliation)

Technical information
- Licensing authority: FCC
- Facility ID: 22245
- ERP: 13.4 kW
- HAAT: 123.5 m (405 ft)
- Transmitter coordinates: 30°33′0.8″N 83°0′47″W
- Translator(s): W30FA-D Homerville, GA

Links
- Public license information: Public file; LMS
- Website: www.wctv.tv/page/wctv-2/

WFXU (channels 15 and 57) is a television station licensed to Live Oak, Florida, United States, serving the Tallahassee, Florida–Thomasville, Georgia market. It is programmed primarily as an independent station, but maintains a secondary affiliation with MyNetworkTV. WFXU is owned by Gray Media alongside CBS affiliate WCTV (channel 6). The two stations share studios on Halstead Boulevard in Tallahassee (along I-10); WFXU's transmitter is located in Hamilton County, Florida, between Jasper and Jennings.

Due to its transmitter being located on the eastern fringe of the Tallahassee–Thomasville market, WFXU's signal is unable to reach Tallahassee proper. In order to serve the entire market, two of WFXU's subchannels are relayed on WCTV from that station's transmitter in unincorporated Thomas County, Georgia, southeast of Metcalf, along the Florida state line.

== History ==
WFXU began broadcasting June 15, 1998, as a full-time satellite of Fox affiliate WTLH, intending to improve that station's signal in the eastern part of the market. It broadcast an analog signal on UHF channel 57 from the transmitter location near Jasper. Originally owned by L.O. Telecast, Inc., WFXU was sold to KB Prime Media in 1999 and to WTLH owner Pegasus Communications in 2002 (the sale was approved because despite Tallahassee not having enough stations to support a duopoly under Federal Communications Commission (FCC) rules; Pegasus had helped fund WFXU's construction). That April, WFXU broke off from WTLH and became a UPN affiliate.

WFXU's signal was not nearly strong enough to cover the entire market. To make up for this shortfall in coverage, it launched WTLF on May 7, 2003, as a full-time satellite. Pegasus declared bankruptcy in June 2004 over a dispute with DirecTV over marketing of the direct broadcast satellite service in rural areas.

WFXU's logo as a WB affiliate, used from April 1, 2005, until September 17, 2006.

On April 1, 2005, WFXU and WTLF switched to The WB, via The WB 100+; UPN promptly signed with WCTV, which launched a new subchannel to carry the network. Prior to this, The WB was carried on a cable-only WB 100+ station, "WBXT", which was operated by WTXL-TV (channel 27). On January 24, 2006, The WB and UPN announced that they would merge to form The CW. It was announced on April 24 that WTLH would create a new second digital subchannel to become Tallahassee's CW affiliate. These plans were modified around August 2006 to make WFXU/WTLF the primary CW affiliate, with a simulcast on WTLH-DT2; this took effect when the network premiered on September 18.

Although most of the Pegasus station group was sold in August 2006 to private investment firm CP Media, LLC of Wilkes-Barre, Pennsylvania, WFXU was instead sold to Budd Broadcasting that November. Since then, the station has operated intermittently as an independent station, with CW programming being seen only on WTLF and WTLH-DT2. More recently, it resumed operations from October 17 to November 14, 2010, and from November 12 to early December 2011 after being silent since November 2009; this was done in order to avoid forfeiture of the broadcast license.

In June 2008, WFXU applied to relocate its digital transmitter to west of High Springs, near Gainesville, with the intent of refocusing its viewership on that market. The FCC dismissed the application that December. The call letters were changed to WTXI on December 12, 2011, parking the call letters for a co-owned station in Miami; a week later, the station returned to WFXU.

The station had a construction permit, which would have enabled the station to broadcast at 1,000 kilowatts at 278.9 meters (915 ft) HAAT, from a transmitter site along US 441 in northern Columbia County, about 20 miles (32 km) north of Lake City, allowing rimshot coverage into Gainesville, Jacksonville, and Waycross, Georgia. This permit expired sometime in the late 2010s.

Gray Television agreed to purchase WFXU, along with translator WUFX-LD, on June 26, 2017, in a $600,000 deal. The sale made WFXU and WUFX-LD sister stations to WCTV in Thomasville, Georgia, and WCJB-TV in Gainesville. The sale was completed on December 27.

As of September 14, 2013, WFXU returned to the air, this time as a Soul of the South affiliate; it then switched to Retro TV as of April 8, 2016. On April 30, 2018, WFXU became affiliated with MyNetworkTV and MeTV.

On January 5, 2026, WFXU started airing two local newscasts from sister station WCTV on weekdays at 7 a.m. and every night at 10 p.m. This resulted from the end of a news-sharing agreement between WCTV and WTWC-DT2 which has aired WCTV-produced newscasts since 2003 (on WTLH from 2003 to 2014, and then on WTWC's second subchannel from 2015 to 2026).

== Subchannels ==
The station's signal is multiplexed:

Subchannels of WFXU
Subchannel	Res.	Short name	Programming
15.1	1080i	TLMDO	Telemundo (WTFL-LD)
57.1	1080i	MyNet	Main WFXU programming
57.2	480i	MeTV	MeTV (WCTV) (4:3)
57.3	480i	StartTV	Start TV
57.4	480i	Catchy	Catchy Comedy
57.5	480i	Defy	Defy

Simulcast of subchannels of another station
