= WTWC-TV =

Television station in Tallahassee, Florida

- Tallahassee, Florida; Thomasville–Valdosta, Georgia; United States
- City: Tallahassee, Florida
- Channels: Digital: 22 (UHF); Virtual: 40
- Branding: NBC 40, Fox 49

Programming
- Affiliations: 40.1: NBC; 40.2: Fox; 40.3: Charge!

Ownership
- Owner: Sinclair Broadcast Group; (WTWC Licensee, LLC)
- Sister stations: WTLF, WTLH

History
- First air date: April 21, 1983
- Former channel numbers: Analog: 40 (UHF, 1983–2009); Digital: 2 (VHF, 2002–2009), 40 (UHF, 2009–2020)

Technical information
- Licensing authority: FCC
- Facility ID: 66908
- ERP: 560 kW
- HAAT: 600 m (1,969 ft)
- Transmitter coordinates: 30°40′50.3″N 83°58′20.6″W
- Translator(s): WBFL-CD 13 Valdosta, Georgia; WBVJ-CD 35 Valdosta, Georgia

Links
- Public license information: Public file; LMS
- Website: wtwc40.com; fox49.tv

WTWC-TV (channel 40) is a television station in Tallahassee, Florida, United States, affiliated with NBC and Fox. It is owned by Sinclair Broadcast Group alongside CW Plus affiliate WTLF (channel 24) and operated with Bainbridge, Georgia–licensed Heroes & Icons affiliate WTLH (channel 49). The three stations share studios on Deerlake South in unincorporated Leon County, Florida, northwest of Bradfordville (with a Tallahassee postal address), and transmitter facilities in unincorporated Thomas County, Georgia, southeast of Metcalf, along the Florida state line.

WTWC-TV was the third commercial television station built in Tallahassee, debuting in April 1983. Technical and financial battles dominated its first 13 years on air, including a malfunction with the station's tower that contributed to a four-year-long bankruptcy proceeding in the 1990s. It has made two attempts at producing local newscasts, neither of which lasted more than a few years. It has not produced any longform newscasts at all since 2000. In 2015, the Fox affiliation moved from WTLH to a subchannel of WTWC-TV, still called "Fox 49". The Fox subchannel had newscasts produced by the region's CBS affiliate, WCTV, until they were discontinued in early 2026.

== History ==
=== Construction and financial woes ===
Vencap Communications of Chattanooga, Tennessee, made an application in August 1980 to build a new television station on channel 40 in Tallahassee, which would be the region's third commercial outlet. Their bid attracted three competitors: JGM, Inc. and Holt-Robinson Television, which both proposed commercial independent stations, as well as Octagon Corporation, proposing a rebroadcaster of its WMBB-TV, then the NBC affiliate in Panama City.

The Federal Communications Commission (FCC) selected Holt-Robinson in early 1982. The company obtained an affiliation with NBC; after weather foiled a scheduled October startup, Holt-Robinson planned a launch date of January 30, 1983, coinciding with NBC's telecast of Super Bowl XVII. However, that plan was dashed during construction of the station's tower. In designing the 800-foot (240 m) mast, the contractor failed to account for the construction crane necessary to hoist the 1.7-short-ton (1.5 t) antenna into place, and the tower twisted when the antenna was being mounted. To fix the damage, the top 40 feet (12 m) of the tower had to be replaced.

This work was completed by April, and WTWC-TV finally made its debut on April 21, 1983, using a temporary antenna. Tallahassee's original station, WCTV, switched from NBC to CBS in 1959; since then, viewers had depended on Panama City's WJHG-TV (before 1982, WMBB) and WALB-TV in Albany, Georgia, for NBC programs. (Note: While WJHG-TV and WALB-TV were both on Tallahassee cable, neither station's Grade B signal contour reached Tallahassee, though they covered areas to the west and north, respectively. WMBB, which switched to ABC in 1982, broadcast from a site further east than WJHG and reached Tallahassee.) Holt-Robinson then sued the tower manufacturer for defective work and commissioned a new tower 80 feet (24 m) away. The station was forced to sign off on the afternoon of October 6 to lower the temporary antenna and re-tune it. It returned to the air the following morning, forcing viewers to watch the Major League Baseball League Championship Series on cable via other stations. The tower problems were later credited by Holt-Robinson as having prevented it from going forward with plans to build a second station in Marshall, Texas, although the FCC determined that the delay to the Marshall station was a result of "internal business decisions made by Holt-Robinson".

Holt-Robinson's financial condition was tested during its time running WTWC-TV. It not only had to contend with long-dominant CBS affiliate WCTV, the only commercial VHF station in the market, and ABC affiliate WECA-TV (channel 27, now WTXL-TV) but also with Albany's WALB and Panama City's WJHG. For some time, Tallahassee's cable system continued to carry WALB and WJHG in addition to WTWC. It placed the three stations on adjacent channels, fragmenting NBC network viewership. WALB continued to outrate WTWC in part because local cable viewers stopped tuning for NBC programming once they landed there, leading WTXL general manager Mark Keown to conclude channel 40 caught "a rotten break" from the channel placement. In 1986, the company had to agree to payment plans with a group of 11 program syndicators and faced trouble finding lenders, though the firm was able to refinance. There were other problems, most notably in 1988 when the FCC ordered the station to provide reports on its affirmative action program. The station's condition was such that its call letters were said to mean "We're Tallahassee's Worst Channel".

In a sign of what was to come, in August 1991, Paramount Television sued WTWC-TV for broadcasting Cheers after having the rights revoked for nonpayment. The next year, Holt-Robinson and WTWC filed for Chapter 11 bankruptcy protection; they had been forced to do so because one of the company's lenders, Greyhound Television, had asked in federal court for the appointment of a receiver, and the station owed some $600,000 to program producers and news services. Bankruptcy proceedings for Holt-Robinson and Holt-owned properties in Hattiesburg, Mississippi, stretched on for more than two years; in the latter, WTWC-TV was cited as a drain on Holt's finances.

Holt-Robinson was placed into receivership in 1993, and a court-appointed examiner later found that Holt defrauded the bankruptcy estate of $385,000. Soundview Media Investments entered into an agreement to acquire WTWC and Holt-Robinson's other holding, WHHY-AM-FM radio in Montgomery, Alabama, for $7.1 million in 1994.

=== Guy Gannett and Sinclair ownership ===
This deal failed to close; instead, Guy Gannett Communications of Portland, Maine, acquired the station in 1996. As part of a $3 million investment in a long-stagnating outlet, Guy Gannett purchased transmission equipment, expanded the station's studios by 6,000 sq ft (557 m^{2}), and added 37 new employees. Guy Gannett put itself up for sale in 1998 because of a lack of interest by younger members of the Gannett family in the business; the five television stations were purchased by Sinclair Broadcast Group for $310 million.

In 2001, Media Ventures Management, the then-owner of ABC affiliate WTXL-TV, entered into a five-year outsourcing agreement with Sinclair to combine sales and operations staffs with WTWC-TV. WTXL staffers moved from that station's studios to WTWC-TV's facility in 2002. That same year, on December 1, WTWC-TV began digital broadcasts on channel 2. Media Ventures sold WTXL-TV to the Southern Broadcast Corporation (later known as Calkins Media) in 2005; the new management opted to operate independently, ended the operating agreement just shy of its five-year term in February 2006, and began plans for a new studio site.

On September 25, 2013, New Age Media (owner of then-Fox affiliate WTLH and operator of WTLF) announced that it would sell most of its stations to Sinclair; the buyer, however, could not acquire its Tallahassee stations directly. It was initially proposed that related company Cunningham Broadcasting acquire WTLH and Deerfield Media acquire WTLF, with Sinclair operating both under shared services agreements. This acquisition languished at the FCC, and on October 31, 2014, New Age Media requested the dismissal of its application to sell WTLH; the next day, Sinclair purchased the non-license assets of WTLH and WTLF and began operating them through a master service agreement. At midnight on January 1, 2015, Sinclair moved the Fox affiliation to WTWC's second digital subchannel.

WTWC-TV relocated its signal from channel 40 to channel 22 on March 13, 2020, as a result of the 2016 United States wireless spectrum auction.

== Newscasts ==
Holt-Robinson launched the first attempt at a local news service on WTWC, News 40, on October 13, 1986. Within six months of the newscast's launch, WTWC-TV's general manager resigned; the female news anchor was dismissed because owner Holt had wanted a male solo anchor and only used a two-anchor format on the general manager's advice. Emblematic of the station's woes at the time, the newscasts were pocked with technical snafus and drew criticism for questionable news judgment. Under the circumstances, it took until January 1988 for the newscasts to attract an audience large enough for A. C. Nielsen to generate a rating. By then, the station attracted six percent of the Leon County audience, which was dwarfed by WTXL's 11 percent and WCTV's 72 percent. Turnover was high; by the start of 1988, only one original anchor was still at the station. The news department was ultimately axed in March 1991.

As soon as Guy Gannett announced its purchase of WTWC-TV, it declared its intention to add local newscasts. It hired away Mike Rucker, a longtime meteorologist at WCTV, from his position at the Florida Division of Emergency Management to become channel 40's chief meteorologist. NBC News 40 launched March 13, 1997. Guy Gannett poured significant resources into the news department, investing in a modern set and weather equipment. While it waged a battle with WTXL for second place behind long-dominant WCTV, the news department lost money throughout its existence. WTWC axed its newscasts at the end of November 2000 after learning it faced severe budget cuts for 2001 under Sinclair. Station management felt the cutbacks would make a quality product impossible and decided to get out of local news altogether.

While the NBC channel does not offer any local news, the Fox subchannel did under arrangements that predated Sinclair operation. In 2003, WTLH had partnered with WCTV for the latter to produce a 10 p.m. local newscast, a partnership that later expanded to include an hour-long newscast at 7 a.m. On January 5, 2026, these newscasts moved to Gray-owned WFXU (channel 57.1/6.6).

== Technical information ==
=== Subchannels ===
WTWC-TV is broadcast from a tower near Metcalfe, Georgia, near the Florida state line. Its signal is multiplexed:

Subchannels of WTWC-TV
Subchannel	Res.	Short name	Programming
40.1	1080i	NBC	NBC
40.2	720p	FOX	Fox
40.3	480i	Charge	Charge!

=== Repeaters ===
In addition to its main signal, WTWC-TV can be seen on two low-power Class A digital repeaters serving Valdosta, Georgia:

Station	City of license	Channel (RF / VC)	ERP	HAAT	Facility ID	Transmitter coordinates	Transmitter location	Public license information
WBFL-CD	Valdosta, GA	13 (VHF); 13	2 kW	103 m (338 ft)	48763	30°40′9″N 83°19′31″W	on Madison Highway/GA 31 between unincorporated Clyattville and Florida state line	Public file LMS
WBVJ-CD	Valdosta, GA	35 (UHF); 35	1.5 kW	84 m (276 ft)	23487	30°58′14″N 83°17′12″W	unincorporated northern Lowndes County between Hahira and Moody Air Force Base	Public file LMS
