= WTXL-TV =

Television station in Tallahassee, Florida

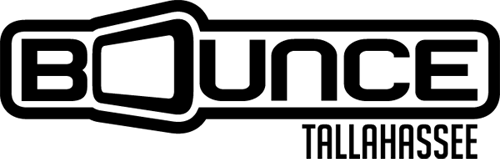
- Tallahassee, Florida; Thomasville–Valdosta, Georgia; United States
- City: Tallahassee, Florida
- Channels: Digital: 27 (UHF); Virtual: 27
- Branding: WTXL ABC 27

Programming
- Affiliations: 27.1: ABC; for others, see § Subchannels

Ownership
- Owner: E. W. Scripps Company; (Scripps Broadcasting Holdings LLC)

History
- First air date: September 16, 1976
- Former call signs: WSCT (1974–1976); WECA-TV (1976–1984)
- Former channel numbers: Analog: 27 (UHF, 1976–2009); Digital: 22 (UHF, until 2009)

Technical information
- Licensing authority: FCC
- Facility ID: 41065
- ERP: 1,000 kW
- HAAT: 518 m (1,699 ft)
- Transmitter coordinates: 30°40′6″N 83°58′10″W

Links
- Public license information: Public file; LMS
- Website: www.wtxl.com

WTXL-TV (channel 27) is a television station in Tallahassee, Florida, United States, affiliated with ABC and owned by the E. W. Scripps Company. The station's studios are located on Commerce Boulevard in Midway, Florida, and its transmitter is located near unincorporated Fincher (in northwestern Jefferson County, Florida), along the Georgia state line.

== History ==
The station debuted on September 16, 1976, as WECA-TV, owned by local businessman Evans Craig Allen. In the early years, its slogan was "We Can Do It!" which was a play on the call letters. The station was the second commercial station to sign-on in the market. Prior to channel 27's arrival, CBS affiliate WCTV had been the sole commercial outlet in the area and carried ABC in off-hours.

Tallahassee had a very long wait for a second station, even though it had been big enough to support at least two stations by the late 1950s and three by the 1960s. However, the Tallahassee market is one of the largest geographic markets east of the Mississippi, stretching across most of the central Florida Panhandle and much of Southwestern Georgia. Only two VHF licenses were allocated to the Tallahassee area—WCTV on channel 6, and non-commercial educational (later PBS member) WFSU-TV on channel 11. UHF stations do not carry well across large areas, making potential station owners skittish about applying for the available UHF channels in the area. By the 1970s, however, cable had gained enough penetration to make a UHF station viable.

Its original studios were on Thomasville Road (US 319/SR 61) in Tallahassee, and it aired an analog signal on UHF channel 27 from a transmitter located at the facilities. By its fourth year of broadcasting, WECA used the slogan "Up & Coming".

In 1984, Allen sold the station to Tallahassee 27 Limited Partnership, led by former Senator Joseph Tydings and former Representative Louis Frey, Jr. The call letters were the changed to the current WTXL-TV on June 25. The station's history page claims the new owners took over in 1985, but according to Federal Communications Commission (FCC) files, the call letters were switched in 1984.

In September 1998, WTXL established a cable-only affiliate of The WB. Known as "WBXT" and originally on-air as "WB 28" (based on the cable channel location), it was part of the national WB 100+ service. Since it was available exclusively on cable, the call sign was fictional in nature and thus not officially recognized by the FCC. WTXL provided local advertisements and performed promotional duties for "WBXT". On April 1, 2005, UPN affiliates WFXU/WTLF switched to The WB through The WB 100+. UPN promptly signed with WCTV which launched a new second digital subchannel to carry the network. As a result, the "WBXT" operation was shut down.

In 2001, Media Ventures Management (then owner of WTXL) entered into an operational outsourcing agreement with rival NBC affiliate WTWC-TV (channel 40, owned by the Sinclair Broadcast Group) which resulted in that station controlling WTXL and "WBXT". On March 17, 2002, this outlet merged all of its operations into WTWC's studios (on Deerlake South in unincorporated Leon County, Florida northwest of Bradfordville). The agreement between WTXL and WTWC was the first of its kind in the United States and was something similar to arrangements known today as local marketing and shared services agreements. The Southern Broadcast Corporation (which it would be renamed Calkins Media) acquired WTXL's license on November 30, 2005, but allowed the outsourcing agreement to continue. On February 20, 2006, the partnership between the two stations was dissolved when the Southern Broadcast Corporation gave notice to terminate the agreement with Sinclair. As a result, WTXL moved out of the WTWC building.

After leaving WTWC's facilities, WTXL temporarily rented studio space from WFSU-TV on the campus of Florida State University. On June 20, 2006, this station broke ground on new studios in a commercial park in nearby Midway. The station fully moved into the new facility in August 2007. WTXL has been digital-only since February 17, 2009. Between January 1992 and April 26, 2011, WTXL served as ABC's affiliate of record for Southwest Georgia, as that area did not have an affiliate of its own after WVGA ceased operations due to financial issues. The following day, WALB added ABC to its second digital subchannel.

On April 11, 2016, it was reported that Calkins would exit the broadcasting industry and sell its stations to Raycom Media. The sale was completed on April 30, 2017.

On June 25, 2018, Raycom Media announced that it agreed to be sold to Gray Television, owner of WCTV. Because the FCC prohibits a direct duopoly between two of the top four stations in the same TV market, Gray opted to retain ownership of higher-rated WCTV and sell WTXL to a third party. On August 20, it was announced that the E. W. Scripps Company would buy WTXL and sister station KXXV in Waco, Texas (along with semi-satellite KRHD-CD in Bryan), for $55 million. The sale was approved the FCC on December 20, and was completed on January 2, 2019.

== News operation ==
WTXL presently broadcasts 28 1/2 hours of locally produced newscasts each week (with 4 1/2 hours each weekday and three hours each on Saturdays and Sundays).

WTXL has traditionally been a distant runner up in the ratings to longtime dominant WCTV. WTWC has never been a contender in the market because its two attempts to air local newscasts were both unsuccessful. The second news department operated by that station was ultimately shuttered due to poor viewership and budget cuts.

Throughout the duration of the operational outsourcing agreement between WTXL and WTWC, WTXL produced some limited newscast programming on WTWC, even though WTWC was the senior partner in the agreement. More specifically, WTXL's on-air team provided WTWC with weekday morning local news and weather cut-ins seen at 7:27 and 8:26 during its airing of Today. There were also news and weather briefs aired weeknights at 5:58 and 6:28 on the NBC outlet. The aforementioned programming was taped in advance since WTXL already had prior commitments with its own local newscasts. In addition, there was severe weather coverage presented on WTWC when conditions warranted (such as during a tornado warning).

On January 15, 2001, through a news share arrangement, WTXL began producing a weeknight prime time broadcast for "WBXT" called WB 28 News at 10. Airing for thirty minutes, the show was seen exclusively on cable and billed as the market's only prime time local show seen in the 10 p.m. time slot. Since the WB station periodically changed channel locations on area cable systems, the name was changed to reflect this. It was later called WB 11 News at 10 and then WB 6 News at 10. The "WBXT" newscast produced by WTXL was eventually canceled in September 2003.

In August 2007, after resuming operations independent of WTWC, WTXL debuted a new set from new studios in Midway, featuring the same design scheme as then-sister station WAAY-TV in Huntsville, Alabama. At the same time, this outlet became the first television station in the market to upgrade local newscasts to high definition level. Corresponding with the launch of Bounce TV on WTXL-DT2, the market's only weeknight local newscast in early prime time was added to the subchannel's schedule. The show, known as Bounce TV News at 7, could be seen for thirty minutes featuring a separate graphics package and music theme from the main channel's broadcasts. For an unknown reason, the show was dropped after its October 25, 2013, airing.

In January 2018, WTXL began using the Raycom Media standardized graphics in its newscasts. Coinciding with the change, WTXL also began using "Inergy" by Stephen Arnold Music, which was coincidentally the standardized music package for its future owner Scripps. On November 19, 2019, WTXL debuted new graphics and a new set, as well as a new music package from Stephen Arnold Music.

== Subchannels ==
The station's signal is multiplexed:

Subchannels of WTXL-TV
Subchannel	Res.	Short name	Programming
27.1	720p	WTXL-HD	ABC
27.2	480i	Bounce	Bounce TV
27.3	480i	Grit	Grit
27.4	480i	Mystery	Ion Mystery
27.5	480i	CourtTV	Court TV
27.6	480i	Busted	Busted
27.7	480i	HSN	HSN
