= WTLH =

Television station in Bainbridge, Georgia, United States

- Bainbridge, Georgia; Tallahassee, Florida; United States
- City: Bainbridge, Georgia
- Channels: Digital: 19 (UHF); Virtual: 49

Programming
- Affiliations: 49.1: Heroes & Icons; 49.2: The CW Plus; 49.3: Comet

Ownership
- Owner: New Age Media, LLC; (New Age Media of Tallahassee License, LLC)
- Operator: Sinclair Broadcast Group
- Sister stations: WTWC-TV, WTLF

History
- Founded: March 21, 1985
- First air date: February 12, 1989
- Former channel numbers: Analog: 49 (UHF, 1989–2009); Digital: 50 (UHF, until 2020)
- Former affiliations: Fox (1989–2014); MeTV (2015–2018)
- Call sign meaning: "Tallahassee" (also IATA airport code for Tallahassee International Airport)

Technical information
- Licensing authority: FCC
- Facility ID: 23486
- ERP: 560 kW
- HAAT: 600 m (1,969 ft)
- Transmitter coordinates: 30°40′50.3″N 83°58′20.6″W

Links
- Public license information: Public file; LMS

WTLH (channel 49) is a television station licensed to Bainbridge, Georgia, United States, serving the Tallahassee, Florida–Thomasville, Georgia market as an affiliate of Heroes & Icons. The station is owned by New Age Media and operated by Sinclair Broadcast Group alongside NBC/Fox affiliate WTWC-TV (channel 40) and CW Plus affiliate WTLF (channel 24). The three stations share studios on Deerlake South in unincorporated Leon County, Florida, northwest of Bradfordville (with a Tallahassee postal address), and transmitter facilities in unincorporated Thomas County, Georgia, southeast of Metcalf, along the Florida state line.

== History ==
WTLH began on February 12, 1989, airing an analog signal on UHF channel 49; the station immediately became Tallahassee's Fox affiliate. Originally owned by New South Television, it was put into receivership due to owner Timothy Brumlik's arrest on money-laundering charges. In 1990, it was sold to Paul Lansat of Singer Island, Florida. In 1994, the station was sold to Pegasus Broadcasting. On June 15, 1998, WFXU in Live Oak, Florida was established as a full-time satellite of WTLH in order to improve its coverage on the eastern side of the market. Since Tallahassee did not have enough stations to legally permit a duopoly, WFXU was technically owned by L.O. Telecast but operated by Pegasus through a local marketing agreement.

That station was sold to KB Prime Media in 1999 and became wholly owned by Pegasus in 2002. The sale was ultimately approved because the company helped fund WFXU's construction. In April of that year, WFXU became a separate station after becoming the area's first UPN affiliate. Since its signal was not nearly strong enough to cover the entire market, WTLF in Tallahassee was established as a full-time satellite. That station was one of the first in the United States to sign-on as a digital-only outlet with no analog counterpart.

On January 24, 2006, The WB and UPN announced the networks would end broadcasting and merge. The new combined service would be called The CW. The letters would represent the first initial of its corporate parents: CBS (the parent company of UPN) and the Warner Bros. unit of Time Warner. It was made public April 24 that WTLH would create a new second digital subchannel to become Tallahassee's CW affiliate. The plan was later modified in August to make WFXU/WTLF the primary CW affiliates and have a simulcast provided on WTLH-DT2. This took effect when the network premiered on September 18, 2006.

Pegasus declared bankruptcy in June 2004 over a dispute with DirecTV (then owned by Fox Entertainment Group and public shareholders) over marketing of the direct broadcast satellite service in rural areas. The station group was sold in August 2006 to private investment firm CP Media, LLC of Wilkes-Barre, Pennsylvania for $55.5 million. Eventually, CP Media formed a new broadcasting company known as New Age Media.

The company purchased WTLH at the end of March 2007 but sold WFXU separately to Budd Broadcasting. The latter dropped CW programming soon afterward leaving WTLF as Tallahassee's sole CW affiliate with the simulcast of that station continuing on WTLH-DT2. On February 17, 2009, WTLH shut off its analog signal on UHF channel 49 and became digital-exclusive on UHF channel 50.

On September 25, 2013, New Age Media announced that it would sell most of its stations to the Sinclair Broadcast Group. In order to comply with Federal Communications Commission (FCC) ownership restrictions, since Sinclair already owns WTWC, its partner company Cunningham Broadcasting planned to acquire the WTLH license but Sinclair was slated to operate the station (as well as WTLF, which would have been acquired by another sidecar operation, Deerfield Media) through shared services agreements.

On October 31, 2014, New Age Media requested the dismissal of its application to sell WTLH; the next day, Sinclair purchased the non-license assets of WTLH and WTLF and began operating them through a master service agreement. On New Year's Day 2015, Sinclair moved the Fox affiliation to WTWC's second subchannel. At that point, MeTV programming moved from its third digital subchannel to its main channel; the simulcast of WTLF continues on its second subchannel.

On April 30, 2018, WTLH switched to Heroes & Icons, after MeTV left to affiliate with WFXU and the second digital subchannel of WCTV.

== Technical information ==
=== Subchannels ===
The station's signal is multiplexed:

Subchannels of WTLH
Subchannel	Res.	Short name	Programming
49.1	1080i	H&I	Heroes & Icons
49.2	1080i	CW	The CW (WTLF)
49.3	480i	Comet	Comet

Simulcast of subchannels of another station
