= Metcalfe Historic District =

Historic district in Georgia, United States

- U.S. National Register of Historic Places
- U.S. Historic district
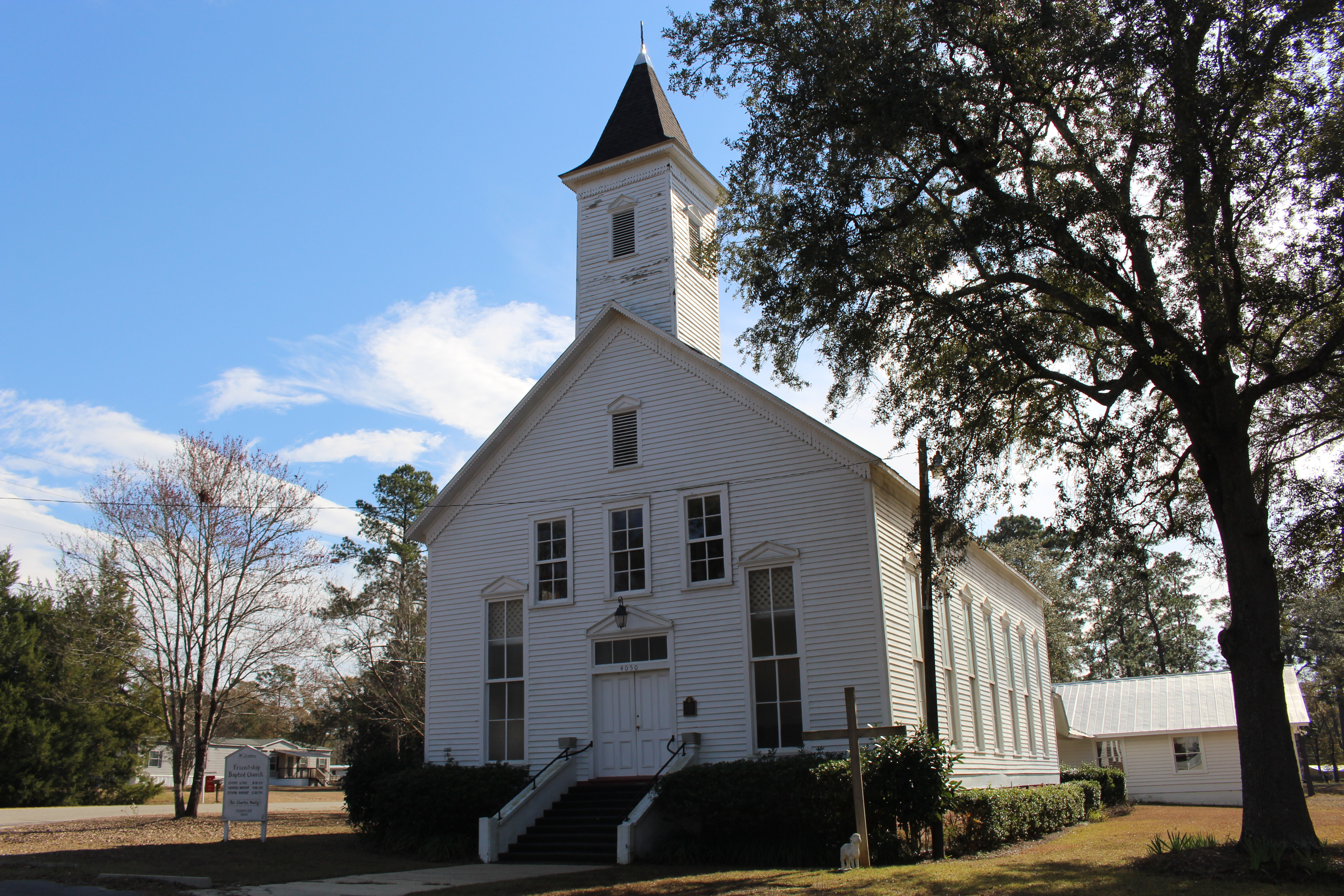

- Location within Georgia Location within the United States
- Location: Roughly bounded by Magnolia, Hancock, Louis and Williams Sts., Metcalfe, Georgia
- Coordinates: 30°42′03″N 83°59′18″W
- Area: 96.4 acres (39.0 ha)
- Built: 1925
- Architectural style: Late Victorian, Stick/eastlake, Queen Anne
- NRHP reference No.: 78001007
- Added to NRHP: September 20, 1978

The Metcalfe Historic District in Metcalfe, Georgia is a 96.4-acre (39.0 ha) historic district which included 35 contributing buildings when it was listed on the National Register of Historic Places in 1978.

Principal historic resources include:

- the railroad depot
- Baptist church
- Rushin-Willett House (1890)
- Crenshaw-Thomas House (c. 1890)
- Home Cotton Gin (c. 1900).
