= WVFS =

WVFS Tallahassee
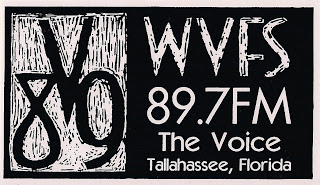
- Tallahassee, Florida; United States
- Broadcast area: Tallahassee, Florida
- Frequency: 89.7 MHz

Programming
- Format: College Radio; Alternative

Ownership
- Owner: Florida State University
- Sister stations: WFSQ, WFSU-FM, WFSW, WFSU-TV

History
- First air date: 1987; 39 years ago
- Call sign meaning: Voice of Florida State

Technical information
- Licensing authority: FCC
- Facility ID: 4204
- Class: C3
- ERP: 7,000 watts
- HAAT: 55 meters
- Transmitter coordinates: 30°26′22.00″N 84°17′29.00″W

Links
- Public license information: Tallahassee Public file; LMS
- Website: wvfs.fsu.edu

WVFS, launched in 1987, is one of four radio stations that broadcast from Florida State University in the Tallahassee area. (WFSQ, WFSU-FM, and WFSW are the others.) WVFS is referred to as "V89", "The Voice", or "The Voice of Florida State". WVFS broadcasts at 89.7 FM. The station is staffed by student and community volunteers. Featuring no automation, the DJ booth at WVFS is staffed 24 hours a day, 7 days a week, every day of the year. New and different music is played to provide an alternative to commercial radio.

== Programming ==
The programming schedule at WVFS is divided into regular programming and specialty programming. Regular programming time slots include a combination of newly released material, music from the WVFS Catalog, and listener requests. Regular programming also occasionally features News, Weather, and Concert Updates, promotional announcements, and public service announcements (PSAs). Specialty programming on WVFS consists of 28 named shows of varying lengths which air at routinely scheduled times, either once every week or once every month.

== Volunteers ==
WVFS holds a volunteer "cattle call" at the beginning of the fall, spring, and summer semesters to recruit volunteers. WVFS accepts student volunteers from Florida State University as well as community volunteers.

== Awards ==
Year	Award	Category	Work	Credits	Result
2009	New York Festivals	Best Music Program	Sonic Safari	Host : Jamie Madden	Bronze
2009	New York Festivals	Magazine Format	Vox Populi	Creative Director: Heidi Kerr; News Director: Ryan Williams; Chief Anchor: Chantal-Marie Wright; Chief Producer: Tim Cason	Bronze
2009	New York Festivals	Best Comedy/Humor Personality: Local	Hearty White	Executive Producer/Host: David Morris	Finalist

== See also ==
- Campus radio
- List of college radio stations in the United States
