= WFSU-TV =

Television station in Tallahassee, Florida

WFSU-TV and WFSG

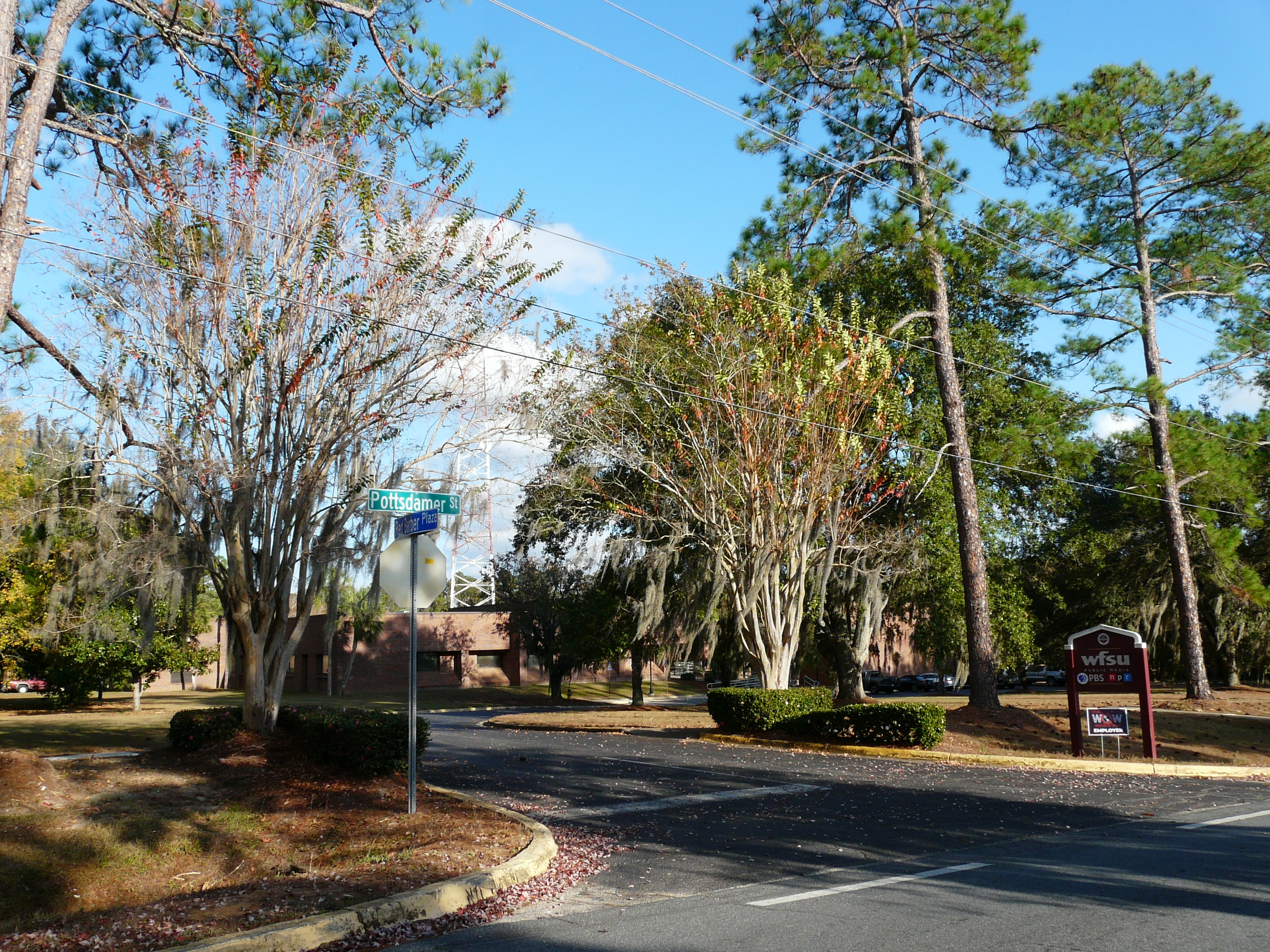

WFSU-TV: Tallahassee, Florida; WFSG: Panama City, Florida; United States
- Channels for WFSU-TV: Digital: 32 (UHF); Virtual: 11
- Channels for WFSG: Digital: 28 (UHF); Virtual: 56
- Branding: WFSU Public Media PBS

Programming
- Affiliations: 11.1/56.1: PBS; for others, see § Subchannels

Ownership
- Owner: Florida State University
- Sister stations: WFSU-FM, WFSQ, WVFS, WFSW

History
- First air date: WFSU-TV: September 20, 1960; WFSG: July 22, 1988
- Former channel number: WFSU-TV: Analog: 11 (VHF, 1960–2009); WFSG: Analog: 56 (UHF, 1988–2009); Digital: 38 (UHF, 2003–2019)
- Former affiliations: WFSU-TV: NET (1960–1970)
- Call sign meaning: WFSU-TV: Florida State University; WFSG: WFSU Gulf Coast

Technical information
- Licensing authority: FCC
- Facility ID: WFSU-TV: 21801; WFSG: 6093
- ERP: WFSU-TV: 937.8 kW; WFSG: 110 kW
- HAAT: WFSU-TV: 237 m (778 ft); WFSG: 151.7 m (498 ft)
- Transmitter coordinates: WFSU-TV: 30°21′31.7″N 84°36′37.7″W; WFSG: 30°22′3″N 85°55′28″W

Links
- Public license information: WFSU-TV: Public file; LMS; WFSG: Public file; LMS
- Website: wfsu.org

WFSU-TV (channel 11) is a PBS member television station in Tallahassee, Florida, United States. It is owned by Florida State University alongside NPR members WFSU-FM (88.9) and WFSQ (91.5 FM). The three stations share studios at the Public Broadcast Center on the Florida State campus on Red Barber Plaza in Tallahassee; WFSU-TV's transmitter is located near Bloxham, Florida.

WFSG (channel 56) in Panama City operates as a full-time satellite of WFSU-TV; this station's transmitter is located near Ebro. WFSG covers the Panama City and Marianna areas and the Emerald Coast (Eastern Florida panhandle), although there is significant overlap between the two stations' contours otherwise. WFSG is a straight simulcast of WFSU-TV; on-air references to WFSG are limited to Federal Communications Commission (FCC)-mandated hourly station identifications during programming. Aside from the transmitter, WFSG does not maintain any physical presence locally in Panama City. Although Panama City is in the Central Time Zone, all schedules are listed in Eastern Time.

== History ==
WFSU-TV went on the air for the first time on September 20, 1960, on channel 11. The FCC had allocated only one VHF channel (channels 2-13) to the Tallahassee market. After the Tallahassee market was expanded to include a large portion of southwest Georgia, Florida State persuaded the FCC to make channel 11 a noncommercial license. Channels 14-69 in the UHF spectrum were available, but were not as easily accessible to television viewers, and were not seen as viable at the time. While this move assured north-central Florida and southwest Georgia would receive PBS service, it also meant that Tallahassee would have a long wait for full service from all three major commercial networks. The VHF channel was already allocated to FSU, and the available UHF channels were seen as undesirable. The market would not receive a commercial station until WCTV signed on using channel 6 in Thomasville, Georgia. While WCTV has effectively been a Tallahassee station since it debuted, a commercial station would not sign on licensed to Tallahassee proper until WECA-TV (now WTXL-TV) opened in 1976.

WFSG signed on July 22, 1988, replacing a low-powered translator on channel 22 that had served Panama City since the late 1970s.

=== Today in the Legislature ===
In 1973, "Florida Public Broadcasting" (FPB), a joint venture between WFSU-TV and WJCT in Jacksonville, and under the aegis of the Florida Public Broadcasting Service, began program coverage of the Florida Legislature, which was transmitted to and broadcast by the eight affiliated PBS television stations in Florida, from a mobile facility located on the grounds of the State Capitol. The program was called Today in the Legislature, and was the first of its kind in the United States, preceding legislative programs in other states, and U.S. Congressional coverage by C-SPAN.

Reaction to the first year of the program was positive. The state legislature dedicated funds to expand the program, managed exclusively by WJCT. Production facilities migrated into the (old) Capitol building, with engineering and studio facilities constructed on the third floor. The first broadcast from the new facility was on April 2, 1974. Today in the Legislature expanded into an hour-long weekday program during the legislative session, with a one-hour Spanish language summary, Hoy en la Legislatura produced on Fridays as well as a sign language program. It was hosted by veteran broadcaster Jim Lewis, with additional commentary by Elizabeth "Bib" Willis. Research, engineering, and production crews were composed chiefly of recent graduates from the Florida State University Department of Communications (now the Florida State University College of Motion Picture, Television and Recording Arts), nearly all under the age of 25, including producer Elliott C. Mitchell and director John P. Leu, as well as future Georgia legislator Chesley V. Morton, who worked as a still photographer and camera operator for the program. Today in the Legislature was described as a "unique blend of television of record and more conventional news coverage." A research study concluded that the program generated more positive attitudes about the legislature and increased political knowledge in adolescents who viewed the broadcast, although only 12% found the programming to be "interesting".

== Technical information ==
=== Subchannels ===
The stations' signals are multiplexed:

Subchannels of WFSU-TV and WFSG
Subchannel		Res.	Short name		Programming
WFSU-TV	WFSG	Res.	WFSU-TV	WFSG	Programming
11.1	56.1	1080i	WFSU-HD	WFSG-HD	PBS
11.2	56.2	480i	WFSU-FL	WFSG-D2	The Florida Channel
11.3	56.3	480i	Create	WFSG-D3	Create
11.4	56.4	480i	KIDS360	WFSG-D4	PBS Kids

=== Analog-to-digital conversion ===
WFSU-TV and WFSG shut down their analog signals on February 17, 2009, the original target date on which full-power television stations in the United States were to transition from analog to digital broadcasts under federal mandate (which was later pushed back to June 12, 2009). The station's digital channel allocations post-transition are as follows:

- WFSU-TV shut down its analog signal, over VHF channel 11; the station's digital signal remained on its pre-transition UHF channel 32, using virtual channel 11.
- WFSG shut down its analog signal, over UHF channel 56; the station's digital signal remained on its pre-transition UHF channel 38, using virtual channel 56.

== Other services ==
WFSU-TV operates a statewide public affairs network, The Florida Channel, that covers the state legislature, a local version of C-SPAN. This network is seen on selected cable TV systems and government-access television (GATV) channels throughout the state of Florida.

=== 4FSU ===
WFSU-TV also operated "4FSU", which carried simulcasts of The Florida Channel and programming related to the university community, including a half-hour weather-focused program produced by students; it also provided a training ground for students studying for careers in the broadcasting field.

The channel began on Comcast cable channel 47 in 1995, then as "FSU6" on channel 6 in 2000 before finally settling down on channel 4 as "4FSU" in 2002. After 28 years in operation, WFSU shut down the channel on March 31, 2023.

== Controversy ==
In June 2011, it was revealed that WFSU-TV would receive $2.8 million in funding for various services related to Florida government, including The Florida Channel. This is despite the $4.8 million of funding to other public radio and television stations vetoed by Governor Rick Scott in May 2011.
