= WFXL =

Television station in Albany, Georgia, United States

- Albany, Georgia; United States
- Channels: Digital: 29 (UHF); Virtual: 31
- Branding: Fox 31

Programming
- Affiliations: 31.1: Fox; for others, see § Subchannels

Ownership
- Owner: Sinclair Broadcast Group; (WFXL Licensee, LLC)
- Operator: Marquee Broadcasting
- Sister stations: WSWG, WSST-TV

History
- First air date: February 14, 1982
- Former call signs: WTSG (CP, 1978–1981); WCGT (CP, 1981); WTSG-TV (1981–1989)
- Former channel numbers: Analog: 31 (UHF, 1982–2009); Digital: 12 (VHF, until 2021)
- Former affiliations: Independent (1982–1986); FNN (secondary, 1982–1985)
- Call sign meaning: "We're Fox Albany"

Technical information
- Licensing authority: FCC
- Facility ID: 70815
- ERP: 1,000 kW
- HAAT: 253 m (830 ft)
- Transmitter coordinates: 31°19′53″N 83°51′43″W

Links
- Public license information: Public file; LMS

WFXL (channel 31) is a television station in Albany, Georgia, United States, serving as the Fox affiliate for Southwest Georgia. It is owned by Sinclair Broadcast Group and operated by Marquee Broadcasting alongside WSWG (channel 44), a CBS affiliate, and WSST-TV (channel 55), an independent station with MyNetworkTV. The three stations share offices on Slappey Boulevard in Albany; WFXL's transmitter is located east of Doerun along the Colquitt–Worth county line.

== History ==
WFXL's previous logo until 2009.

The station signed on February 14, 1982, as WTSG-TV, Southwestern Georgia's first independent station. It was founded by Black physician Carl Gordon Jr. The station's original studio facilities were located on North Slappey Boulevard/US 82 in Albany. It became a charter Fox affiliate on October 9, 1986. However, the station itself still operated as a de facto independent because the Fox network only had one program on its lineup until April 1987 and even then, would not expand to seven nights of programming per week until 1993. Prior to that time, the station aired movies on nights where Fox had no scheduled programming. Gordon sold the station to NewSouth Broadcasting in 1987. The station changed its call letters to the current WFXL in 1989.

Clarion Broadcasting purchased the station in 1996. Clarion then sold WFXL to the Wicks Broadcast Group (which also owned fellow Fox affiliates KCIT in Amarillo, Texas, KJTL in Wichita Falls, Texas–Lawton, Oklahoma, and WPGX in Panama City, Florida, as well as NBC affiliate KMTR in Eugene, Oregon). in 1998. In March 1999, Waitt Broadcasting bought the station from Wicks. Raycom Media acquired the outlet in December 2003 through its purchase of most of Waitt Media's stations. In March 2006, Raycom announced the sale of WFXL and eleven other stations to Barrington Broadcasting to meet Federal Communications Commission (FCC) rules regarding station ownership. The company had just acquired the Liberty Corporation, owner of NBC affiliate WALB, which it decided to keep.

On June 1, 2006, a MH-47 Chinook military chopper traveling from Hunter Army Airfield in Savannah, Georgia, to Fort Rucker in Alabama for a training mission hit a guy wire connected to WFXL's 1,000-foot-tall (300 m) tower resulting in a crash. While the tower and WALB's one nearby remained standing other than some guy wires, the stations were forced to temporarily cease over-the-air signals; broadcasts on cable were not affected. If the WFXL tower had collapsed, this could have also caused WALB's to topple as both were only 150 feet (46 m) apart. As a result, Raycom (which at that time still operated WFXL while the sale to Barrington awaited FCC approval) acquired auxiliary transmitters and antennas for both WFXL and WALB which were installed at a backup tower at WALB's studios in Albany.

On June 7, the WFXL tower was demolished, but in doing so one of the tower's guy wires wrapped around one for WALB's tower, as feared. As a result, that station's tower collapsed in an incident shown on live television. Since both stations were already transmitting their signals from the tower at the WALB studios, they were still on the air but at low-power. Thirteen months later, a new tower for both WFXL and WALB was constructed and began broadcasting on July 3 at 11:35 p.m.

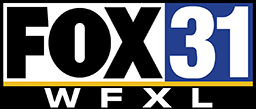
WFXL's logo until 2024.

On February 28, 2013, Barrington Broadcasting announced the sale of its entire group, including WFXL, to the Sinclair Broadcast Group. The sale was completed on November 25. The station's second digital subchannel began carrying programming from Sinclair's American Sports Network syndication package starting with its inaugural broadcast on August 30, 2014. As a result of subsequent acquisitions by the Sinclair Broadcast Group, WFXL became a sister station to company-owned clusters in Pensacola, Florida–Mobile, Alabama, Gainesville, Florida, and Tallahassee, Florida.

In 2024, Sinclair and Marquee Broadcasting, owner of WSWG and WSST-TV in the Albany market, entered into joint sales and shared services agreements allowing Marquee to provide sales, programming, and other services to WFXL-TV.

== News operation ==
Previously, as a typical Fox affiliate with a weeknight prime time newscast, WFXL aired five hours of local news a week. Along with WALB, WFXL was formerly one of two stations in Albany to produce local news that actually focused on the city (WSWG, the market's CBS affiliate, began to produce market-specific newscasts in 2019, but had for most of its existence carried the newscasts of former sister station WCTV in the Tallahassee, Florida, market as a semi-satellite of that station).

To offer comprehensive severe weather coverage, WFXL purchased a more technologically advanced and powerful computerized weather system in 2007. This included access to live Doppler weather radar capabilities from the National Weather Service site at Moody Air Force Base and an automated severe weather warning system.

In September 2008, WFXL gave its newscasts a new look by updating its graphics package and constructing a new set. At the same time, it added a half-hour to its weeknight prime time news at 10. It had aired, at one point, a weeknight newscast at 6:30 that competed with the national news shows on the big three stations. However, on September 19, 2011, WFXL replaced this newscast with a two-hour block of syndicated programming. On October 24, 2011, it added a fourth hour to its weekday morning show which aired from 5 until 9 a.m.

On January 22, 2016, WFXL dropped its four-hour morning show and replaced it with syndicated and E/I programming. This was followed in April 2016 with the cancellation of the station's half-hour weekend newscasts. Concurrently, production of the station's weeknight primetime newscasts were shifted to Macon sister station WGXA; all news and weather duties were now handled at WGXA.

As of February 2023, WFXL has shuttered its news operation. Instead of local newscasts, the Sinclair-produced news show The National Desk airs weekdays from 6 to 9 a.m. and nightly from 10 p.m. to midnight.

== Technical information ==
=== Subchannels ===
The station's signal is multiplexed:

Subchannels of WFXL
Subchannel	Res.	Short name	Programming
31.1	720p	WFXLDT	Fox
31.2	480i	WFXLTBD	Roar
31.3	480i	WFXLCMT	Comet
31.4	480i	WFXLCHG	Charge!

=== Analog-to-digital conversion ===
WFXL shut down its analog signal, over UHF channel 31, on June 12, 2009, the official date on which full-power television stations in the United States transitioned from analog to digital broadcasts under federal mandate. The station's digital signal remained on its pre-transition VHF channel 12, using virtual channel 31.
