= WGCW-LD =

Television station in Albany, Georgia

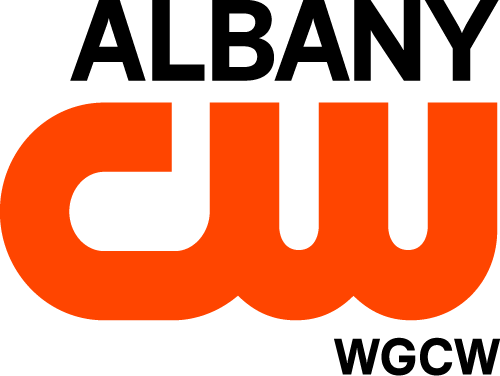
- Albany, Georgia; United States
- Channels: Digital: 36 (UHF); Virtual: 36
- Branding: Albany CW

Programming
- Affiliations: 36.1: CW+; 36.2: 365BLK

Ownership
- Owner: Gray Media; (Gray Television Licensee, LLC)
- Sister stations: WALB

History
- Founded: February 22, 2011
- First air date: April 22, 2019
- Former call signs: W36EG-D (2011–2018)
- Former affiliations: Silent (2011–2019)
- Call sign meaning: Georgia CW

Technical information
- Licensing authority: FCC
- Facility ID: 184721
- Class: LD
- ERP: 15 kW
- HAAT: 87.7 m (288 ft)
- Transmitter coordinates: 31°36′46.7″N 84°11′18.4″W
- Translator(s): WALB 10.4 Albany, GA

Links
- Public license information: LMS

WGCW-LD (channel 36) is a low-power television station in Albany, Georgia, United States, serving Southwest Georgia as an affiliate of The CW Plus. It is owned by Gray Media alongside dual NBC/ABC affiliate WALB (channel 10). The two stations share studios on Stuart Avenue in Albany, where WGCW-LD's transmitter is also located.

Due to WGCW-LD's low power status, its broadcast range only covers the immediate Albany area. Therefore, it can also be seen through a 16:9 widescreen standard definition simulcast on WALB's fourth digital subchannel (10.4) from a transmitter east of Doerun, along the Colquitt–Worth county line.

== History ==
WGCW-LD was founded on February 22, 2011, as a new low-power television station on UHF channel 36, W36EG-D. In 2019, the station became the market's CW affiliate, after owner Gray Television moved the network affiliation from the third digital subchannel of CBS affiliate WSWG (channel 44), licensed to Valdosta, which was sold by Gray to Marquee Broadcasting in order to purchase WALB from Raycom Media.

== Subchannels ==
The station's signal is multiplexed:

Subchannels of WGCW-LD
Channel	Res.	Short name	Programming
36.1	720p	WGCW-LD	The CW Plus
36.2	480i	THE365	365BLK
