= WSWG =

Television station in Valdosta, Georgia, United States

- Valdosta–Albany, Georgia; United States
- City: Valdosta, Georgia
- Channels: Digital: 31 (UHF); Virtual: 44
- Branding: CBS 44 WSWG

Programming
- Affiliations: 44.1: CBS; 44.3: Independent with MyNetworkTV (WSST-TV); for others, see § Subchannels

Ownership
- Owner: Marquee Broadcasting; (Marquee Broadcasting Georgia, Inc.)
- Sister stations: WSST-TV, WFXL

History
- First air date: December 24, 1980
- Former call signs: WVGA (1980–1994); WGVP (1994–2001); WVAG (2001–2005)
- Former channel numbers: Analog: 44 (UHF, 1980–2007); Digital: 43 (UHF, 2007–2018)
- Former affiliations: ABC (1980–1992); Dark (1992–1995); The WB (1995–1997); UPN (1997–2006)
- Call sign meaning: Southwest Georgia

Technical information
- Licensing authority: FCC
- Facility ID: 28155
- ERP: 85 kW
- HAAT: 258.4 m (848 ft)
- Transmitter coordinates: 31°10′18.7″N 83°21′56.6″W
- Translator(s): WSST 55 Cordele: CBS (55.20), MeTV (55.2)

Links
- Public license information: Public file; LMS
- Website: www.southgatv.com

WSWG (channel 44) is a television station licensed to Valdosta, Georgia, United States, serving as the CBS affiliate for Southwest Georgia. It is owned by Marquee Broadcasting alongside WSST-TV (channel 55), an independent station with MyNetworkTV, and operated with Sinclair Broadcast Group–owned Fox affiliate WFXL (channel 31). The three stations share offices on Slappey Boulevard in Albany; WSWG's transmitter is located in unincorporated Cook County, northeast of Adel. Although Valdosta is part of the Tallahassee, Florida, television market, which receives CBS programming from Thomasville, Georgia–licensed WCTV, WSWG is assigned by Nielsen to the Albany market.

Channel 44 in Valdosta went on the air in 1980 as ABC affiliate WVGA. It operated as a small station with limited local programming from December 1980 to February 1992. During this time, it was off the air in late 1988 and early 1989 after a small airplane crashed into its tower. WTXL-TV, the ABC affiliate in Tallahassee, ran the station for seven months but ultimately withdrew from its attempt to buy it, after which time it was off the air for three years.

Hutchens Communications rebuilt the station as WB affiliate WGVP in 1995, changing to UPN in 1997. Financial issues snarled Hutchens Communications ownership and led to several attempts to force a sale and the ultimate resignation of the company's namesake. After being steadied by changes in ownership and management, Gray Television acquired it in 2005, combined its operations with WCTV under the call sign WSWG, and then repurposed it the next year as a semi-satellite of WCTV for the Albany area. This continued until 2019, when Gray purchased Raycom Media and was forced to sell WSWG to remain under ownership limits in the market. It was then purchased by Marquee Broadcasting.

== History ==
=== WVGA ===
Peachtree Telecasting, a consortium of out-of-state investors, applied to the Federal Communications Commission (FCC) in 1978 to build a new TV station in Valdosta, Georgia. The permit was issued in April 1979, and Peachtree began meeting with the major television networks, seeking an affiliation. The group won the ABC affiliation for the Valdosta area; the nearest ABC affiliate, WECA-TV (now WTXL-TV) in Tallahassee, Florida, did not adequately cover the city. Peachtree Telecasting investors also included Hi Ho Broadcasting, owner of ABC affiliate WDHN in Dothan, Alabama.

Construction stretched through most of 1980: the station set up studios on Norman Drive and erected a tower near Adel. The station began broadcasting on the evening of December 24. However, the station got off to a visibly bumpy start. It had presented a $16,000 check to the local chamber of commerce for office renovations in a goodwill gesture, but the check turned out to be bad; further, the studio-transmitter link was misaligned, leading to a degraded signal. Local programming slowly ramped up, first with commercial production and a local farm show before debuting evening newscasts. However, the station had a very difficult time obtaining national advertising, affecting its financial viability. WVGA had to compete with WALB in Albany and WCTV in Tallahassee, which drew higher ratings in the market.

Morris Network acquired WVGA and WDHN in 1986. Two years later, however, tragedy struck. On the morning of August 17, 1988, a dense fog spread over the region. Frank Blaydes, a doctor from Cairo, was piloting a Cessna 172 and had been diverted from Valdosta's airport to Adel. He never made it; after apparently mistaking the lights on the WVGA tower for the lights at the Adel airport, he crashed his plane into the tower. The impact killed Blaydes and collapsed WVGA's tower. Investigators determined that the pilot was not rated to land in such weather conditions and that no information was available to him about the weather at Adel.

The tower collapse knocked WVGA off the air until January 1989, costing it considerable advertising revenue. Blaydes's parents initially sued Peachtree Telecasting for wrongful death compensation, claiming the station had been negligent in maintaining the tower. That lawsuit was dropped and replaced with one against Morris, to which the company responded with a countersuit. The matter proceeded to a jury trial in Chatham County in July 1991. The station had local news at the time of the tower collapse, but the two lead anchors departed during the station outage for other jobs. Morris replaced the newscast with morning and evening newsbriefs. Later in 1989, WVGA reinstated a longform newscast, which was aired live at 6 p.m. and replayed at 11 p.m. However, advertiser interest in the newscast was limited, and local businesses preferred to use radio and newspapers as they had for years. As a result, the newscast was discontinued in September 1990.

In February 1992, Morris Network reached a deal to sell WVGA to WTXL-TV owner ET Broadcasting. ET immediately dropped what local programming remained on the station and turned it into a full-time satellite of WTXL-TV, also an ABC affiliate. The FCC granted permission for the two stations to be commonly owned in September, citing the fact that Morris had shopped the station to buyers since 1987 without success; company officials also noted that WVGA was sandwiched between two markets and national ratings services could not agree as to in which market the station belonged. However, the sale was never consummated due to what were described as technical differences. ET walked away from the deal on November 6, 1992. Without a programming source, WVGA left the air.

=== WB and UPN ===
For the next two years, several groups looked at purchasing the station, which Morris threatened to dismantle. Gary Hutchens, a local business owner whose Welcome Channel broadcast local programming on the Valdosta cable system and the owner of video production firm Georgia Video Professionals, mounted an effort to put the station back on the air, proposing initially to return it to the air as an ABC affiliate. His Hutchens Communications (HCI) acquired the station for $1 million and announced in January 1994 that it would use its own studio facilities in conjunction with the Adel tower.

Hutchens reopened the station on October 28, 1995, as WGVP, an affiliate of The WB. It originally operated from temporary studios in Remerton, Georgia, but it returned to the former WVGA building because no other suitable facility existed in Valdosta. The station's tower was the site of tragedy yet again on August 11, 1996, during a helicopter lift of the old antenna off the mast as part of its replacement. The helicopter clipped the tower and crashed into the forest; the pilot died instantly.

WGVP switched to UPN on August 25, 1997, becoming the UPN affiliate of record in the Tallahassee and Albany media markets. In the switch, it retained its local news coverage, with newscasts at 6, 10, and 11 p.m., until January 1998. Even though it technically was the affiliate in the full market, its signal did not reach Tallahassee, leaving that city without UPN programming for more than a year until W17AB, later WVUP-LP, picked up the network in October 1998. Meanwhile, back in Valdosta, financial problems were beginning to arise. In September, some employees staged a walkout for lack of payment. Other employees would later speak of being paid in gift certificates to a local restaurant.

In order to find cash, Hutchens struck deals with two different companies related to the station. One was Venture Technologies Group, which granted a $50,000 loan and also filed in April 1998 to have the FCC license transferred to it. The other was Southern Nights Entertainment Corporation (SNE), owner of W17AB/WVUP-LP in Tallahassee, which in March 1998 entered into an agreement with Hutchens to run channel 44 under a local marketing agreement (LMA). The president of Southern Nights, Don Palmer, was unaware of the Venture Technologies deal until two months later. When Hutchens could not pay the loan to Venture, it sued for the money. A new lease agreement and deal to purchase 51 percent of the station was entered in September 1998, owing to HCI's heavy indebtedness. On its first attempt to buy the station outright, legal fallout from the pending Venture suit delayed the transfer. After Venture's suit was dropped in February 1999, Southern Nights reached another deal in February 2000 to buy the station. However, by the time the FCC had granted approval, HCI could not perform; Hutchens no longer owned 51 percent of the station, while Hutchens claimed that Southern Nights had constantly changing financial asks. The deal fell apart in August, and HCI had to reestablish control of the station, dropping UPN programming for several days before it could be restored.

MainStreet Broadcasting, a Pennsylvania management company with experience in turning around troubled TV stations, was brought in by the other stockholders in HCI to steady WGVP. Meanwhile, in September 2000—pursuant to early 1999 agreements between Southern Nights and HCI—SNE attempted to auction its rights to purchase Hutchens to the highest bidder on the steps of the Lowndes County courthouse.

Hutchens resigned in October 2000, the same month three lawsuits between Hutchens Communications and Southern Nights were consolidated and assigned to a special master.

In 2001, the call letters were changed to WVAG, and a new antenna was installed to improve coverage. Studios were relocated to new facilities, with cable company Mediacom occupying the Norman Drive building. By 2003, Broadcasting & Cable considered the station to be the third television station in the Albany market, along with NBC affiliate WALB-TV and Fox affiliate WFXL. Control of Hutchens Communications shifted from Gary Hutchens and Robert Lee Hutchens Jr. to Paul Shok and Donald W. Meinke; the company was renamed Padon Communications and then P.D. Communications.

P.D. Communications sold WVAG to Gray Television for $3.75 million in 2005. For Gray, which had founded Albany's The Albany Herald and WALB-TV but was forced to divest the latter upon acquiring WCTV in 1996 due to signal overlap, the purchase marked a return to the Albany market. Under Gray, the station was renamed WSWG, for Southwest Georgia, in November 2005. WCTV oversaw operations of the station.

=== CBS ===
In December 2005, Gray announced that it would add CBS programming to a subchannel of WSWG, the first-ever CBS affiliation with a subchannel. However, when The WB and UPN announced their merger into The CW in 2006, these plans changed. Instead, CBS was broadcast as the station's primary service, with MyNetworkTV on a subchannel.

On January 30, 2007, WSWG's analog transmission unexpectedly went dark, and a technician's report showed a damaged transmission line and power divider at floor level. Rather than incur $180,000 in repair costs to the tower and power divider, because all WSWG viewers were already in the analog service area of WCTV, Gray opted to surrender its analog license to the FCC the next year and operate as a digital-only channel on UHF channel 43.

In addition to WSWG, Gray had accounting and human resources offices in Albany, a legacy of its establishment in the city; these were closed in 2015, with operations being consolidated at corporate headquarters in Atlanta. By that year, WSWG also was broadcasting The CW to Albany as a subchannel.

On August 16, 2018, Gray announced that it would sell WSWG to Marquee Broadcasting; the deal made it a sister station to WSST-TV (channel 55), an independent station that Marquee had earlier agreed to acquire. The sale was part of Gray's acquisition of Raycom Media, owner of WALB; Gray elected to keep WALB and sell WSWG. In April 2019, Marquee severed WSWG's ties to WCTV. Gray retained the CW affiliation, which moved to WGCW-LD.

WSWG relocated its signal from channel 43 to channel 31 on November 30, 2018, as a result of the 2016 United States wireless spectrum auction.

Marquee requested that WSWG's city of license be changed from Valdosta to Moultrie in 2021, in order to have a city of license within the Albany market; the station is assigned to Albany although Valdosta is in the Tallahassee market. In September 2023, the request was dismissed; the FCC noted it would have left no TV station licensed to Valdosta, which is a larger community than Moultrie.

== Newscasts ==
Following the sale to Marquee Broadcasting, WSWG stopped carrying WCTV's newscasts on April 29, 2019. The station then launched local evening and late newscasts from studios in Albany; the news operation was shared with sister station WSST-TV.

== Technical information ==
=== Subchannels ===
WSWG's transmitter is located in unincorporated Cook County, northeast of Adel. The station's signal is multiplexed:

Subchannels of WSWG
Subchannel	Res.	Short name	Programming
44.1	1080i	WSWG-DT	CBS
44.2	480i	MeTV	MeTV
44.3	480i	WSST	Independent with MyNetworkTV (WSST-TV)
44.4	480i	ION	Ion
44.5	480i	NewsNet	Dabl
44.6	480i	StartTV	Start TV

Simulcast of subchannels of another station
