= WFSU-FM =

WFSU-FM and WFSW

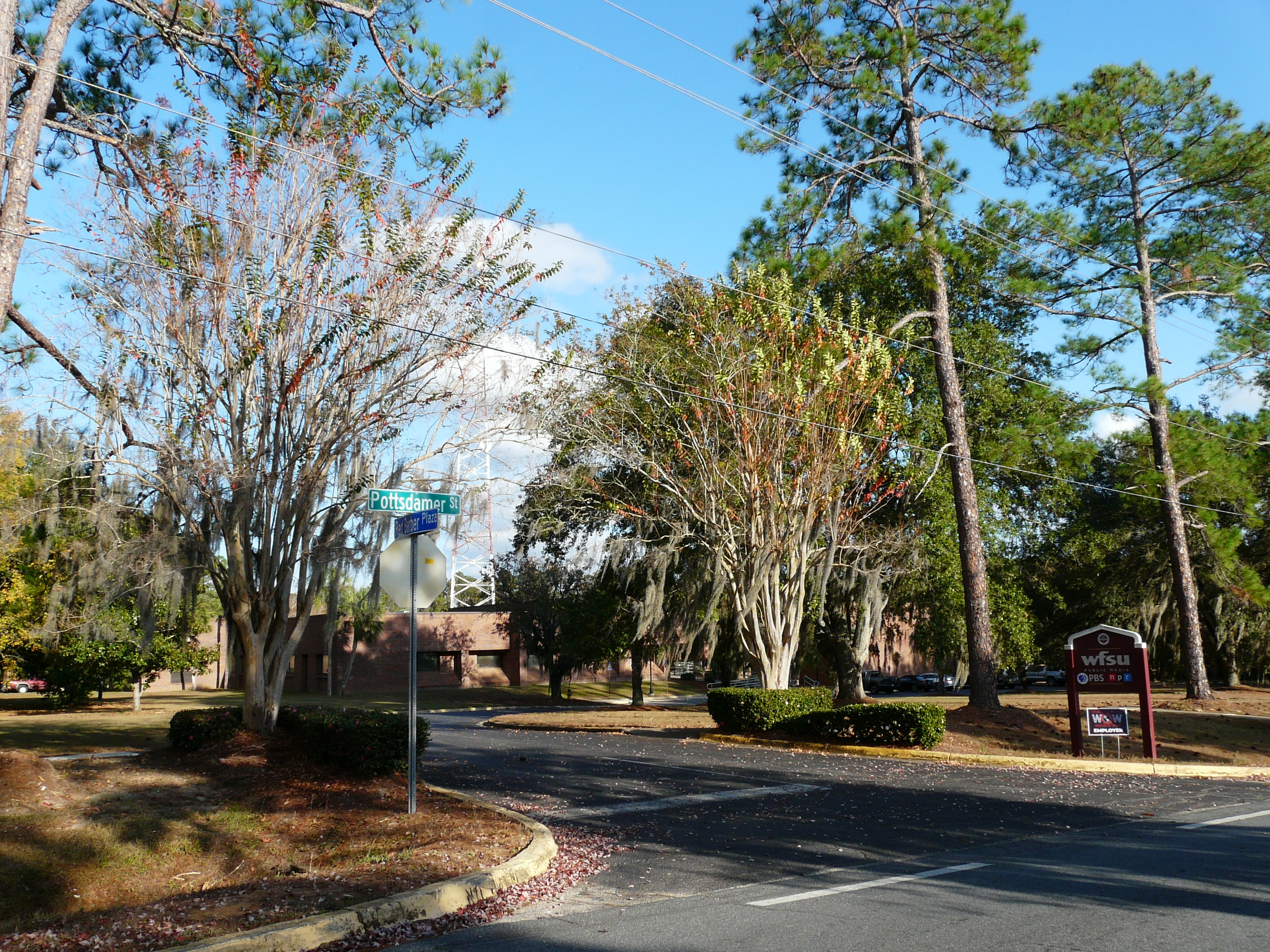

WFSU-FM: Tallahassee, Florida; WFSW: Panama City, Florida; United States
- Frequencies: WFSU-FM: 88.9 MHz (HD Radio); WFSW: 89.1 MHz (HD Radio)
- Branding: WFSU Public Media

Programming
- Format: Public radio
- Subchannels: WFSU-HD2 and WFSW-HD2: WFSQ simulcast WFSU-HD3: Emergency information "Beacon"
- Affiliations: NPR; Public Radio Exchange

Ownership
- Owner: Florida State University
- Sister stations: WFSU-TV

History
- First air date: WFSU-FM: July 1954 and to 88.9 in 1990; WFSW: March 18, 1996
- Call sign meaning: Florida State University

Technical information
- Licensing authority: FCC
- Facility ID: WFSU-FM: 21799; WFSW: 93708
- Class: WFSU-FM: C; WFSW: C1
- ERP: WFSU-FM: 90,000 watts; WFSW: 100,000 watts
- HAAT: WFSU-FM: 379 m (1,243 ft); WFSW: 123 m (404 ft)
- Transmitter coordinates: WFSU-FM: 30°40′13.00″N 83°56′26.00″W; WFSW: 30°50′12.00″N 83°58′57.00″W
- Translator(s): See § Stations

Links
- Public license information: WFSU-FM: Public file; LMS; WFSW: Public file; LMS
- Webcast: Listen live; Listen live
- Website: WFSU website

WFSQ and WFSL
WFSQ: Tallahassee, Florida; WFSL: Thomasville, Georgia; United States
- Frequencies: WFSQ: 91.5 MHz (HD Radio); WFSL: 90.7 MHz
- Branding: WFSU Public Media

Programming
- Format: Classical music

Ownership
- Owner: Florida State University

History
- First air date: WFSQ: October 14, 1990; WFSL: April 15, 2003

Technical information
- Licensing authority: FCC
- Facility ID: WFSQ: 21803; WFSL: 21798
- Class: WFSQ: C1; WFSL: A
- ERP: WFSQ: 86,000 watts; WFSL: 250 watts
- HAAT: WFSQ: 224 m (735 ft); WFSL: 47 m (154 ft)
- Transmitter coordinates: WFSQ: 30°21′31.00″N 84°36′38.00″W; WFSL: 30°22′2.00″N 85°55′29.00″W
- Translator(s): See § Stations

Links
- Public license information: WFSQ: Public file; LMS; WFSL: Public file; LMS
- Webcast: Listen live
- Website: WFSU website

WFSU is the callsign (or variations thereon) for public radio stations operated by Florida State University in Tallahassee, Florida.

== Stations ==
WFSU operates three radio stations that serve northern Florida:

=== WFSU-FM ===
WFSU-FM (88.9 FM) is a Tallahassee-based news/talk/public affairs station carrying several NPR programs and overnight BBC World Service programming. Also relays to the following translators:

Broadcast translators for WFSU-FM
Call sign	Frequency	City of license	FID	ERP (W)	HAAT	Class	FCC info
W229AD	93.7 FM	Tallahassee, Florida	21802	250	44 m (144 ft)	D	LMS
W244BM	96.7 FM	Apalachicola, Florida	4294	250	85 m (279 ft)	D	LMS
W246AX	97.1 FM	Carrabelle, Florida	145226	120	39 m (128 ft)	D	LMS

=== WFSQ & WFSL ===
WFSQ (91.5 FM) is a Tallahassee-based classical music station. Also heard on WFSL (90.7 FM) in Thomasville, Georgia, and relays to the following translator:

Broadcast translator for WFSQ
Call sign	Frequency	City of license	FID	ERP (W)	HAAT	Class	FCC info
W224AT	92.7 FM	Tallahassee, Florida	65440	250	69 m (226 ft)	D	LMS

=== WFSW ===
WFSW (89.1 FM) is a Panama City-based news/talk/public affairs station. Offers many of the same programs as WFSU. Also relays to the following translators:

Broadcast translators for WFSW
Call sign	Frequency	City of license	FID	ERP (W)	HAAT	Class	FCC info
W216BT	91.1 FM	Port St. Joe, Florida	122677	80	48 m (157 ft)	D	LMS
W291AD	106.1 FM	Marianna, Florida	4293	40	87 m (285 ft)	D	LMS

== History ==
Florida State entered radio on January 21, 1949, when WFSU started as a student-run radio station at 660 AM. Due to the terms of its license, the signal was limited to the confines of the Florida State campus. It was on the air for three hours every night during the week, with a lineup of campus news, interviews, music and an occasional radio drama.

The station was forced off the air in April 1953 due to complaints that the signal was leaking off campus. Florida State applied for a low-powered FM license, and WFSU returned to the air at 91.5 FM in July 1954. Soon afterward, it joined the National Association of Educational Broadcasters, allowing it to significantly upgrade its programming with offerings from BBC World Service and Radio France. It also began carrying Seminoles football games because no commercial station in Tallahassee would carry them.

In 1970, WFSU-FM became a charter member of NPR, and was one of the 90 stations to carry the initial broadcast of All Things Considered. In the 1970s, it shifted to a format of mostly classical music.

The station continued to grow during the 1980s, but was somewhat hampered by problems with its signal. Unlike most NPR stations of the time, it had no backup power source for its transmitter, resulting in frequent outages. The station's reception was also marginal at best in the northeastern part of the city, which is very hilly. To solve the problem, WFSU won approval for a new station on 88.9 FM, operating from a new tower northeast of Tallahassee. All NPR news and information programming moved there on October 14, 1990. Classical music remained on 91.5, which received new call letters, WFSQ. However, due to the legal structure of the changeover, the Federal Communications Commission considers WFSQ to be the same station as the old WFSU. To improve its coverage on the Georgia side of the market, Florida State started WFSL in 2003.

WFSW signed on in 1996, providing Panama City with a second NPR service, alongside Gulf Coast Community College's WKGC-FM. Panama City is one of the smallest cities in the country with separate NPR stations.

== Controversy ==
In June 2011, it was revealed that WFSU will receive $2.8 million in funding for various services related to Florida government. This is despite the $4.8 million of funding to other public radio and television stations vetoed by Governor Rick Scott in May 2011.

== See also ==
- WVFS (not affiliated with WFSU)
