= WALB =

Television station in Albany, Georgia, United States

- Albany, Georgia; United States
- Channels: Digital: 10 (VHF); Virtual: 10
- Branding: WALB, WALB News 10; WALB ABC (10.2)

Programming
- Affiliations: 10.1: NBC; 10.2: ABC; 10.4: CW+; for others, see § Subchannels

Ownership
- Owner: Gray Media; (Gray Television Licensee, LLC)
- Sister stations: WGCW-LD

History
- First air date: April 7, 1954
- Former call signs: WALB-TV (1954–2003)
- Former channel numbers: Analog: 10 (VHF, 1954–2009); Digital: 17 (UHF, 2001–2009)
- Former affiliations: Both secondary: ABC (1954–1980); DuMont (1954–1955)
- Call sign meaning: Albany

Technical information
- Licensing authority: FCC
- Facility ID: 70713
- ERP: 22 kW
- HAAT: 297 m (974 ft)
- Transmitter coordinates: 31°19′52″N 83°51′43″W
- Translator(s): WTSG-LD 33 Tifton; W16EK-D Douglass

Links
- Public license information: Public file; LMS
- Website: walb.com

WALB (channel 10) is a television station in Albany, Georgia, United States, serving Southwest Georgia as an affiliate of NBC and ABC. It is owned by Gray Media alongside low-power CW+ affiliate WGCW-LD (channel 36). The two stations share studios on Stuart Avenue in Albany; WALB's transmitter is located east of Doerun, along the Colquitt–Worth county line.

== History ==
The station signed on the air on April 7, 1954. It was built from the ground up by Gray Communications (now Gray Media), owners of WALB radio (1590 AM) and The Albany Herald. It is one of only two full-power stations to have been built and signed on by the company, the other being WCAV-TV in Charlottesville, Virginia (which it no longer owns). When the radio station's studios were built back in 1953, Stuart Avenue was a dirt road running through a pecan grove. For its first three years on-air, WALB-TV transmitted an analog signal on VHF channel 10 from a tower at its studios. As the first television outlet in Albany, it was a primary NBC affiliate with secondary relations with ABC and DuMont.

The latter network was dropped in 1955 when it shut down and ABC remained on WALB until 1980 when WVGA (now WSWG) started up in Valdosta. The station moved to a tower near Doerun was built in 1957. The radio station was sold in 1960 to Allen Woodall, Sr. and became known as WALG to distinguish itself from the television station. In March 1976, a fire destroyed WALB's main broadcasting facilities but did not damage its offices.

WALB was a major beneficiary of a quirk in the Federal Communications Commission (FCC)'s plan for allocating stations. In the early days of broadcast television, there were twelve VHF channels available and 69 UHF channels (later reduced to 55 in 1983). The VHF bands were more desirable because they carried longer distances. Since there were only twelve VHF channels available, there were limitations as to how closely the stations could be spaced.

After the FCC's Sixth Report and Order ended the license freeze and opened the UHF band in 1952, it devised a plan for allocating VHF licenses. Under this plan, almost all of the country would be able to receive two commercial VHF channels plus one non-commercial channel. Most of the rest of the country ("1/2") would be able to receive a third VHF channel. Other areas would be designated as "UHF islands" since they were too close to larger cities for VHF service. The "2" networks became CBS and NBC, "+1" represented non-commercial educational stations, and "1/2" became ABC (which was the weakest network usually winding up with the UHF allocation where no VHF was available).

However, Albany is sandwiched between Dothan (channels 2 and 4) to the west, Columbus (channels 3, 7, and 9) and Macon (channel 13) to the north, Tallahassee–Thomasville (channels 6 and 11) to the south, and Savannah (channels 3, 9, and 11) and Jacksonville–Brunswick (channels 4, 7, and 12) to the east. This created a large "doughnut" in southwestern Georgia where there could only be one VHF license. Although there were no stations on channels 5 or 8 in the immediate area, channel 5 was occupied in Atlanta and Gainesville while channel 8 was allocated to Waycross (which is part of the Jacksonville market); these cities are too close to Albany to reallocate. As a result, WALB remained the only television station in Southwest Georgia until WXGA-TV began broadcasting from Waycross in 1961 (although that station serves the Jacksonville area).

Until 1983, WALB was the default NBC affiliate for Tallahassee. Although WTWC-TV has been that area's affiliate since then, WALB still provides city-grade coverage to almost all of the Georgia side of the Tallahassee market and Grade B coverage to the city itself. WALB dropped the "-TV" suffix to its call sign in 1993, even though channel 10 and its radio sister had gone their separate ways three decades earlier. As a result of flash flooding caused by Tropical Storm Alberto, WALB stayed on-the-air with non-stop 24-hour coverage to alert citizens and provide a vital link between the public and government agencies.

In 1996, Gray bought WCTV in Tallahassee. The FCC told Gray that it could not keep both WCTV and WALB due to channel 10's aforementioned coverage in Tallahassee; indeed, WCTV had long claimed Albany as part of its secondary coverage area. At the time, the FCC normally did not allow common ownership of two stations with large signal overlaps, and would not even consider a waiver for a city-grade overlap. As a result, Gray sold WALB to Cosmos Broadcasting, the broadcasting division of Liberty Corporation, in 1998.

Liberty sold off its insurance business in 2000, and Cosmos came directly under the Liberty banner. However, Gray continued to maintain its Albany administrative offices (located in the Albany Herald building), until 2015. It returned to its hometown in WSWG in Valdosta that serves Albany. WALB's original digital signal on UHF channel 17 started operating from the Doerun tower in 2001.

In June 2002, WALB donated over 1,600 cans of newsfilm to The Walter J. Brown Media Archives & Peabody Awards Collection at the University of Georgia. The collection contains raw news footage from Albany and surrounding areas from 1961 to 1978, including coverage of the Albany Movement.

WALB launched NBC Weather Plus in 2005 on a new second digital subchannel. Known as "WALB 24/7 Weather", the service gave continuous forecasts for up to thirty cities around Southwestern Georgia. After NBC Weather Plus shut down in December 2008, WALB-DT2 became part of This TV.

Liberty merged with Raycom Media in 2005. Raycom already owned Fox affiliate WFXL, and could not keep both stations because Albany has only four full-power stations—not enough to legally permit a duopoly. Raycom opted to keep WALB and sell WFXL and eleven other stations to Barrington Broadcasting.

On June 1, 2006, a military chopper traveling from Hunter Army Airfield in Savannah to Fort Rucker in Alabama for a training mission hit a guy wire connected to WFXL's 1,000-foot-tall (300 m) tower resulting in a crash. While the tower remained standing and intact (other than the guy wire), the station was forced to temporarily cease its over-the-air signal although broadcasts on cable were not affected. If its tower collapsed, this could have also caused the tower of WALB to topple as both were only 150 feet (46 m) apart. As a result, Raycom (which at that time still operated WFXL while the sale to Barrington awaited FCC approval) acquired auxiliary transmitters and antennas for both WALB and WFXL which were installed at the tower at WALB's studios in Albany. On June 7, WFXL's tower was demolished but in doing so one of the tower's guy wires wrapped around one for WALB's tower as feared. As a result, WALB's tower collapsed in an incident shown on live television. Since both stations were already transmitting signals from the tower at the WALB studios, the two were still on-the-air although at low-power. Thirteen months later, WALB and WFXL's new tower in Doerun was completed and began broadcasting on July 3, 2007, at 11:35 p.m.

It was announced on November 19, 2010, that WALB would begin airing ABC on its second digital subchannel scheduled to begin in early 2011. The subchannel officially joined ABC on April 27, 2011; prior to this, WTXL-TV had been carried on most cable systems in Southwestern Georgia since November 1992, when a failed sale to WTXL's then-owner ET Broadcasting forced WVGA to initially cease operations (some cable customers received ABC programming via the network's affiliates in Columbus, Atlanta, and Gainesville). Raycom affiliated 26 stations including WALB for multiple years with Bounce TV at the network's fall 2011 launch.

On June 25, 2018, Gray Television announced its intent to acquire Raycom for $3.65 billion. Gray had already owned WSWG-TV, which had served as a semi-satellite of WCTV in Tallahassee, and as such, Gray was required to sell either WALB-TV or WSWG due to FCC ownership regulations prohibiting common ownership of two of the four highest-rated stations in a single market (as well as more than two stations in any market). Gray announced that it would keep WALB-TV and sell WSWG to an unrelated third party. On August 16, it was announced that Marquee Broadcasting, who had owned WSST-TV, would purchase WSWG for an undisclosed price. The sale was approved by the FCC on December 20. The sale was completed on January 2, 2019, returning WALB to the original ownership that brought it on the air.

== News operation ==
As of 2021, WALB presently broadcasts 26 hours of locally produced newscasts each week (with six hours each weekday, and an hour each on Saturdays and Sundays).

For many years, WALB was the only big three affiliate to produce local news that actually focused on Albany. For most of WSWG's early tenure as a CBS affiliate, it served as a semi-satellite of WCTV in Tallahassee and simulcasted that station's newscasts with no Southwestern Georgia-specific segments. This changed when Gray sold off WSWG after reacquiring WALB; WSWG has since launched its own news operation.

In 2004, WALB gave its news operation a complete makeover renaming itself from NewsCenter 10 to WALB News 10. It also changed its logo as part of a graphics change. However, it kept the "little one, big zero" 10 which has been part of the logo since the late 1970s at the earliest. This is similar to sister station WIS in Columbia, South Carolina. The station also changed its music from "The Team to Watch", composed by VTS Productions to "The Tower", composed by 615 Music, which was used by many other NBC affiliates. Continuing its modernization, WALB built a new set in 2005 replacing the previous one used for at least twelve years.

Its weekday morning show, Today in Georgia, was expanded to a full two hours (from 5 to 7 a.m.) beginning September 10, 2007, coinciding with the expansion of Today to a four-hour program. On August 4, 2012, WALB upgraded local news production to high definition level. The change made it the second station in the market to perform the upgrade (WSWG's simulcast of WCTV's news programs was first back on August 3, 2009).

With the addition of ABC to WALB-DT2, there are simulcasts of local newscasts from the main NBC channel. More specifically, this includes the second hour of Today in Georgia, its midday show at noon, as well as weeknight newscasts at 6 and 11. In addition, the area's first prime time broadcast at 7 was added on weeknights that is exclusive to the ABC subchannel. Weekend newscasts are simulcast on both of WALB's NBC and ABC channels although there can be a delay or pre-emption on one due to network obligations.

On September 6, 2016, WALB added a half-hour of news at 4 p.m., WALB News 10 – First News at 4.

== Technical information ==
=== Subchannels ===
The station's digital signal is multiplexed:

Subchannels of WALB
Subchannel	Res.	Short name	Programming
10.1	1080i	WALB DT	NBC
10.2	720p	WALB AB	ABC
10.3	480i	Bounce	Bounce TV
10.4	480i	CW	The CW Plus (WGCW-LD) in SD
10.5	480i	Circle	365BLK (WGCW-LD)
10.6	480i	Cozi TV	Cozi TV

Simulcast of subchannels of another station

=== Analog-to-digital conversion ===
WALB shut down its analog signal, over VHF channel 10, on June 12, 2009, the official date on which full-power television stations in the United States transitioned from analog to digital broadcasts under federal mandate. The station's digital signal relocated from its pre-transition UHF channel 17 to VHF channel 10 for post-transition operations.
