= WATC-DT =

Television station in Atlanta

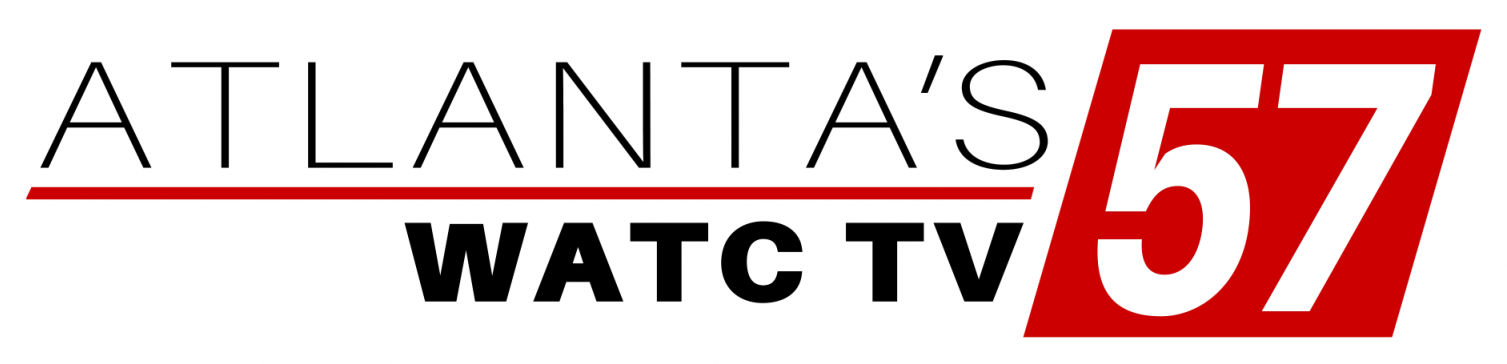
- Atlanta, Georgia; United States
- Channels: Digital: 34 (UHF); Virtual: 57
- Branding: Atlanta's 57

Programming
- Affiliations: 57.1: Religious Independent; for others, see § Subchannels

Ownership
- Owner: Carolina Christian Broadcasting, Inc.; (Community Television, Inc.)
- Sister stations: WGGS-TV

History
- Founded: September 10, 1986
- First air date: April 14, 1996
- Former call signs: WATC (1988–2009)
- Former channel numbers: Analog: 57 (UHF, 1996–2009); Digital: 41 (UHF, 2001–2020)
- Call sign meaning: Atlanta Christian Television (C and T transposed)

Technical information
- Licensing authority: FCC
- Facility ID: 13206
- ERP: 475 kW
- HAAT: 307 m (1,007 ft)
- Transmitter coordinates: 34°3′59.3″N 84°27′16.7″W
- Translator(s): 36 (UHF) Union City (CP)

Links
- Public license information: Public file; LMS
- Website: www.watc.tv

WATC-DT (channel 57) is a religious independent television station in Atlanta, Georgia, United States. Owned by Carolina Christian Broadcasting, the station maintains studios on Enterprise Drive in Norcross, and its transmitter is located on Sweat Mountain in northeastern Cobb County, near the Cherokee County line.

WATC broadcasts programming from various Christian organizations and local and national churches over its two main channels, including World Harvest Television, The Inspiration Network, The Worship Network, Golden Eagle and The Shepherd's Chapel. Its third subchannel carries The Loop, a network made up of classic sitcoms, dramas, Westerns and films, all in the public domain.

== History ==
WATC launched on September 10, 1996.

WATC granted permission to simulcast its signal on WSKC-CA (channel 22, also licensed to Atlanta), so that station could maintain its Class A status. WSKC-CA was located on the same broadcast tower as WATC, and could continue broadcasting in analog even after WATC went digital-only in February 2009. However, it was off-air as of March 2009, and remained so for most of the year. Since then, the station has moved to transmit digitally from a location near Norcross as WSKC-CD, and now airs Korean programming as it had previously done on analog before its affiliation with WATC.

Despite the DTV Delay Act extending the deadline from February 17 to June 12, the station shut down its analog signal on February 17, 2009, the original target date on which full-power television stations in the United States were to transition from analog to digital broadcasts under federal mandate (which was later pushed back to June 12, 2009). The station's digital signal remained on its pre-transition UHF channel 41. On June 18, it changed its broadcast callsign from WATC a few days after the Federal Communications Commission (FCC) announced that TV stations were free to add or drop "-DT" as easily as "-TV". WATC received a construction permit for a fill-in broadcast translator in Union City, Georgia (southwestern metro Atlanta) on channel 36, which was vacated by analog WATL. It will have the same callsign as its parent station (with no extra numerals or other differentiation, despite not being a same-channel booster) and could not be sold separately, as it is within a program the FCC created in 2009 in order to address the shortcomings of the ATSC digital broadcast television system. Since ATSC is very prone to multipath interference, this may be due to reflected signals from the skyscrapers of downtown Atlanta and midtown Atlanta, as well as terrain shielding of the Chattahoochee River valley and the hills around it.

The station formerly had a translator station, W42AO, licensed to Athens, Georgia. That station became WAGC-LD. Owner Carolina Christian Broadcasting, Inc. also owns WGGS-TV, its sister station in Greenville, South Carolina.

In early May 2011, the station added other religious programming called "WATC Too" on new channel 57.2.

== Technical information ==
=== Subchannels ===
The station's signal is multiplexed:

Subchannels of WATC
Subchannel	Res.	Short name	Programming
57.1	1080i	WATC-DT	Main WATC programming
57.2	1080i	POINT	Additional religious programming
57.3	480i	THELOOP	Lovers Of Old Programming
57.4	480i	GR8RLOV	Greater Love TV
