= WSST-TV =

Television station in Cordele, Georgia, United States

- Cordele–Albany, Georgia; United States
- City: Cordele, Georgia
- Channels: Digital: 34 (UHF); Virtual: 55
- Branding: My55 WSST

Programming
- Affiliations: 55.1: Independent with MyNetworkTV; 55.20: CBS; for others, see § Subchannels

Ownership
- Owner: Marquee Broadcasting; (Marquee Broadcasting Georgia, Inc.)
- Sister stations: WSWG, WFXL

History
- First air date: May 22, 1989
- Former channel numbers: Analog: 55 (UHF, 1989–2009); Digital: 51 (UHF, 2003–2017), 22 (UHF, 2017–2018); Virtual: 51 (2009–2017), 22 (2017–2019), 34 (2019)
- Former affiliations: Independent (1989–2019); Channel America (c. 1990–1995); America One (1995–2015); Youtoo America (2015–2017)
- Call sign meaning: Sunbelt-South Telecommunications (previous owner)

Technical information
- Licensing authority: FCC
- Facility ID: 63867
- ERP: 66.2 kW
- HAAT: 111 m (364 ft)
- Transmitter coordinates: 31°53′36″N 83°48′18″W
- Translator(s): WSWG 44.3 Valdosta; WSST-LD 55 Albany

Links
- Public license information: Public file; LMS
- Website: www.southgatv.com

WSST-TV (channel 55) is a television station licensed to Cordele, Georgia, United States, serving Southwest Georgia. It is programmed primarily as an independent station, but maintains a secondary affiliation with MyNetworkTV. WSST-TV is owned by Marquee Broadcasting alongside Valdosta-licensed CBS affiliate WSWG (channel 44), and operated with Sinclair Broadcast Group–owned Fox affiliate WFXL (channel 31). The three stations share offices on Slappey Boulevard in Albany; WSST-TV's transmitter is located in rural southwestern Crisp County.

The station's digital signal extends only about 50 miles (80 km) from Cordele; however, the station is carried on many cable providers in the region, including in Albany and Perry. Since April 22, 2019, in order to increase its over-the-air reach, WSST-TV's primary channel has been simulcast on WSWG's third digital subchannel.

== History ==
Former logo for WSST-TV

WSST-TV signed on May 22, 1989, as an independent station owned by Sunbelt-South Telecommunications Ltd. The station grew out of a cable-only station for Cordele and Vienna that had started in 1981. Though primarily independent, at various points WSST's schedule has included programming from Channel America, America One, and Youtoo America. WSST was originally jointly owned by William B. Goodson and Phillip A. Streetman; Goodson died in 2006, and Streetman assumed full control in 2007.

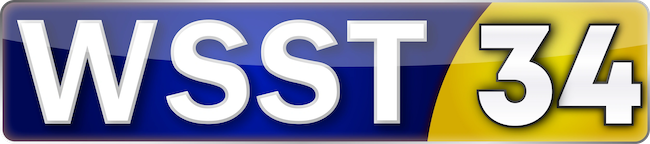
Former logos for WSST-TV from 2019 to 2022

On June 18, 2018, Marquee Broadcasting agreed to purchase WSST from Sunbelt-South Telecommunications. The sale was completed on September 3, 2018. Marquee subsequently acquired CBS affiliate WSWG from Gray Television, making it a sister station to WSST. In May 2019, WSST-TV affiliated with MyNetworkTV; the affiliation was transferred from a WSWG subchannel.

== Local programming ==
WSST-TV aired a rebroadcast of sister station WSWG's early evening newscast and a prime time newscast, which launched on May 6, 2019; prior to then, WSST produced its own evening newscast. Until 2022, WSST also produced South Georgia Sunrise, a two-hour morning news and talk program, and Midday, a half-hour talk and lifestyle program.

== Technical information ==
=== Subchannels ===
The station's digital signal is multiplexed:

Subchannels of WSST-TV
| Subchannel | Res. | Short name | Programming |
|---|---|---|---|
| 55.1 | 480i | WSST DT | Main WSST-TV programming (4:3) |
| 55.2 | 480i | WSST-D2 | MeTV (WSWG) |
| 55.20 | 480i | WSWG-DT | CBS (WSWG) |
| 55.3 | 480i | WSST-D3 | Heroes & Icons |
| 55.4 | 480i | WSST-D4 | Grit |
| 55.5 | 480i | WSST-D5 | Ion Mystery |
| 55.6 | 480i | WSST-D6 | Catchy Comedy |

Simulcast of subchannels of another station

=== Analog-to-digital conversion ===
WSST-TV began broadcasting a digital signal in 2003. Its digital transmitter facilities operated at low power for several years, due to Sunbelt-South Telecommunications, Ltd. being involved in bankruptcy proceedings. The station ended regular programming on its analog signal, over UHF channel 55, on April 15, 2009. WSST's digital signal broadcast on its pre-transition UHF channel 51. The station moved to channel 22 in early 2017, and to channel 34 in December 2018.
