= WCTV =

Television station in Thomasville, Georgia, United States

- Thomasville, Georgia; Tallahassee, Florida; United States
- City: Thomasville, Georgia
- Channels: Digital: 20 (UHF); Virtual: 6
- Branding: WCTV; WCTV Eyewitness News

Programming
- Affiliations: 6.1: CBS; 6.6: Independent with MyNetworkTV; for others, see § Subchannels

Ownership
- Owner: Gray Media; (Gray Television Licensee, LLC)
- Sister stations: WFXU

History
- First air date: September 15, 1955
- Former channel numbers: Analog: 6 (VHF, 1955–2009); Digital: 46 (UHF, 2004–2020)
- Former affiliations: NBC (1955–1959); ABC (secondary, 1955–1976); UPN (6.2, 2005−2006)

Technical information
- Licensing authority: FCC
- Facility ID: 31590
- ERP: 570 kW
- HAAT: 617.2 m (2,025 ft)
- Transmitter coordinates: 30°40′14″N 83°56′26″W

Links
- Public license information: Public file; LMS
- Website: www.wctv.tv

WNXG-LD
ATSC 3.0 station Translator of WCTV
- Tallahassee, Florida
- Channels: Digital: 33 (UHF); Virtual: 38

History
- First air date: May 29, 2012
- Former call signs: W38FL-D (2012–2014); WUFX-LD (2014–2020)
- Call sign meaning: NextGen TV, the trade name for ATSC 3.0

Technical information
- Licensing authority: FCC
- Facility ID: 187680
- Class: LD
- ERP: 15 kW
- HAAT: 260.6 m (855 ft)
- Transmitter coordinates: 30°34′28″N 84°12′9″W

Links
- Public license information: LMS

WCTV (channel 6) is a television station licensed to Thomasville, Georgia, United States, serving as the CBS affiliate for the Tallahassee, Florida, market. It is owned by Gray Media alongside Live Oak, Florida–licensed WFXU (channel 57), an independent station with MyNetworkTV. The two stations share studios on Halstead Boulevard in Tallahassee (along I-10); WCTV's transmitter is located southeast of Metcalfe, Georgia, along the Florida state line.

WCTV was the product of a years-long effort by John H. Phipps to build a television station to serve the Tallahassee area. However, the city was allocated no VHF channels for commercial use at the outset. Believing a UHF station would not be viable, Phipps acquired the nearest available VHF construction permit, channel 6 in Thomasville, from former Georgia governor Eurith D. Rivers. WCTV signed on for the first time on September 15, 1955, with a transmitter site midway between Thomasville and Tallahassee and studios in both cities. Originally airing programs from NBC and CBS, the station became a primary CBS affiliate in 1959. As the only commercial station in the market, WCTV became one of CBS's strongest affiliates, with locally recognized personalities and programs. In 1976, WCTV closed its two studios and consolidated operations in a new facility at its transmitter site. Even after finally receiving competition from other commercial stations in 1976, WCTV remained the dominant station in the region even during down periods for CBS as a whole.

The Phipps family owned WCTV until Gray acquired it in 1996. Under Gray, the station added local news to its schedule, including a 10 p.m. local newscast for Fox affiliate WTLH/WTWC–Fox that aired on that channel until 2026. It relocated to its present site in northeast Tallahassee in 2006. Also in Tallahassee is WNXG-LD, a low-power station used as a testing ground for NextGen TV technology.

== Phipps ownership ==
=== From allocation search to on the air ===
When the Federal Communications Commission (FCC) lifted its years-long freeze on new television stations in April 1952, it allocated three channels to Tallahassee, Florida: ultra high frequency (UHF) channels 24 and 51, for commercial use, and very high frequency (VHF) channel 11, for non-commercial educational broadcasting. The lack of a commercial VHF channel for Tallahassee put it in the unusual position of being a larger city—and a state capital—compared to nearby cities that had VHF allocations. (Note: Although Tallahassee was originally proposed channel 2 for commercial use the year before, new mileage separations adopted between the Third Notice and Sixth Report and Order found the allocation short-spaced to channel 2 at Daytona Beach, Florida, thus requiring the deletion of one of the channels; Tallahassee's channel 2 was deleted and replaced with UHF channel 51.) In 1954, John H. Phipps, owner of radio station WTAL (1270 AM), requested that the FCC re-allocate channel 9 from Dothan, Alabama, to Tallahassee. That attempt instead uncovered that a group in Dothan was preparing an application for the channel, and the FCC denied Phipps's petition. Phipps then applied for channel 2 to be used at Havana, Florida, a western suburb of Tallahassee. However, the Alabama Educational Television Commission presented a competing proposal for its use as a non-commercial station at Andalusia, Alabama, which the FCC selected and reaffirmed. Though two UHF channels were available, Phipps did not consider applying for either of them. He told The Tallahassee Democrat that Tallahassee's population made a television station a risky venture in and of itself and only a VHF station could adequately serve the area. Phipps added that UHF stations did not attract enough interest from networks or advertisers to justify the expense.

Phipps challenged the FCC's award of channel 2 to Andalusia in October 1954. He accused the commission of ignoring its own allocation plan giving priority to serving state capitals. His petition revealed another concern: an active construction permit for a maximum-power station on the nearest VHF channel allotment, channel 6 in Thomasville, Georgia, 36 miles (58 km) north of Tallahassee. Phipps contended that the proposed Thomasville station would be powerful enough to decently cover Tallahassee, making it prohibitively difficult for a potential UHF station to compete. In Phipps's view, the potential trade area for a Tallahassee station was large enough that only a VHF signal could cover it. Former Georgia governor Eurith D. Rivers had applied for channel 6 at Thomasville on July 5, 1952, and received a construction permit on December 23, 1953. In January 1955, Rivers agreed to sell Phipps the permit for the station, already bearing the call sign WCTV. As part of the deal, Phipps also bought Thomasville radio station WKTG, which Rivers had been under contract to acquire at the time. Phipps told the Tallahassee chamber of commerce that he had proposed a maximum-power transmitter facility midway between the two cities. City-grade coverage would extend for 60 miles (97 km) from the transmitter, more than enough to provide a strong signal to both north-central Florida and southwest Georgia. He also proposed a dual-city operation with studios in Tallahassee and Thomasville. The FCC approved the transaction on May 11, as well as the transmitter site, and a September start date was set.

WCTV began broadcasting on September 15, 1955. Its main studio in Thomasville was in the Bank of Thomas County Building, while in Tallahassee programming originated from a new building on Monroe Street. The station had affiliations with NBC and CBS but lacked the interconnection necessary for live network programming; instead, network programs were seen on film. This changed on October 1, 1956, when live NBC programming became available to WCTV and Tallahassee-area viewers. This eliminated a three-week delay for NBC entertainment series as shown on the station. By this time, WCTV also had an affiliation with ABC; however, in its May 1957 schedule, it only carried The Lawrence Welk Show from ABC on a regular basis. On September 20, 1959, WCTV switched primary affiliations from NBC to CBS, continuing carriage of select ABC programs. This eliminated the issue where, for technical reasons, any deviation from NBC had to be agreed to by WCTV and WALB-TV in Albany, Georgia. It also provided a choice of network programming to viewers for whom these were the only two available stations. The affiliation switch spurred a boom in outdoor antenna sales as viewers sought to receive WALB-TV for its NBC network programs including the World Series, no longer available from WCTV.

=== Dominance ===
With a VHF channel, WCTV became entrenched as the dominant station in the Tallahassee area and one of the most dominant in the United States. It aired multiple news and non-news local programs, all of them live. On the first day's schedule was Circle Six Ranch, a children's show hosted by Jack "Foreman Jack" Ridner which ran for nine years. More than 100,000 children appeared on the program during its run. Another first-day employee was Frank Pepper, the brother of U.S. senator Claude Pepper, who had worked at Phipps-owned WTAL. Originally the evening newsreader, Pepper moved to mornings in 1957 when the station disaffiliated from NBC. To replace Today, WCTV launched the Good Morning Show, hosted by Pepper. The local program dominated in the ratings and turned Pepper into a Tallahassee institution and local celebrity. When Phipps realized he had hired no weatherman for the program, he handed Bill Ragsdale, an electrical engineer, a derby hat and had him present the weather. He was nicknamed "Willie the Weatherman" by the curator of the Florida State University (FSU) museum, and such was his celebrity that the FSU band once made a formation inspired by him. From Thomasville, Rural Report (renamed Midday Report in 1969) presented news of interest to farmers.

WCTV attempted to move out of Thomasville for most of its early history. It asked to relocate its studios and for the channel to be reallocated in 1960. In 1972, Phipps sought to transfer the main studio designation for WCTV from Thomasville to Tallahassee. Even though the Tallahassee studio was nominally a secondary facility, 65 employees were based there, including station management, while only 12 worked in Thomasville. Although station president Colin Phipps maintained WCTV had no intention of shuttering the Thomasville studio, it was not enough to prevent the Thomasville chamber of commerce from formally opposing the proposal before the FCC. The Thomasville chamber's president even went as far as to ask the FCC to strip WCTV of its license to make room for a Thomasville-focused station. As a compromise, WCTV agreed to consolidate all operations at a new studio facility midway between the cities, at the transmitter site at the Tall Timbers Research Station. The new studio opened in 1976. The studio location was distant enough from Tallahassee that Ragsdale quit, and it contributed to Pepper's retirement in 1981. WCTV and WALB-TV provided the only commercial television service in the Tallahassee area until Tallahassee-based WECA-TV (channel 27, now WTXL-TV) began in 1976.

John H. Phipps died in 1982. That same year, WCTV began using an earth station, at the time the only one at a CBS affiliate in a 15-state area; it was used for uplinking coverage of the Florida Legislature and the distribution of regional news stories and commercials nationwide.

WCTV continued to be the most-watched television station in Tallahassee in the 1980s, with several contributing factors. One was fragmentation of viewership for NBC programming. In 1983, WTWC-TV (channel 40) began broadcasting as Tallahassee's in-market NBC affiliate, but the cable system in town continued to offer WALB-TV and WJHG-TV from Panama City to subscribers. Another was its larger coverage area than its competitors, particularly in outlying areas. WCTV's early evening newscasts commanded audience shares surpassing 70 percent in the 1980s. While industry changes diminished these figures to 45 to 50 percent by the mid-1990s, WCTV's newscast still attracted six times as many viewers as WTXL, at the time the only other station in the market producing local news. WCTV was so dominant in the Tallahassee market that it boosted CBS's fortunes locally: network programs typically attracted 25% more viewers locally than they did nationwide. In 1995, for instance, WCTV was still the clear market leader even when CBS was in third place nationally. During this period, WCTV expanded news coverage with the addition of a 5:30 p.m. newscast in 1985, while The Good Morning Show was cut back to an hour in 1986 and moved to 6 a.m. in 1994 to accommodate CBS This Morning. Phipps also invested in a satellite truck and other equipment for the station.

=== W17AB ===
In 1986, Phipps acquired Tallahassee low-power TV station W17AB (channel 17), which became the first low-power TV station to be rated by Nielsen. In 1985, W17AB had twice been the most-watched low-power station in the country. Phipps maintained W17AB's format as a minority and local-interest complement to WCTV. However, due to increased competition, it ceased separate programming in March 1989, began airing the Home Shopping Network, and was sold later that year.

== Gray ownership ==
In early 1995, Phipps's son and successor, Gene, decided to put WCTV on the market. With prices for television stations reaching all-time highs and none of his seven children wishing to stay in the television business, he felt the time was right to sell. In December 1995, John H. Phipps Inc. agreed to sell WCTV, along with a Tallahassee paging business and WKXT-TV in Knoxville, Tennessee, to another Southern media company, Gray Communications Systems. Gray had been the founding owner of Albany's WALB-TV but could not keep both stations due to a large signal overlap; at the time, the FCC normally did not allow common ownership of two stations with overlapping signals even if they were in different markets. Gray was forced to put WALB in a trust to allow the sale to go through. After two years, it traded WALB to Cosmos Broadcasting for WEAU-TV in Eau Claire, Wisconsin.

WCTV's news output remained the same until 1999, when a half-hour of evening news at 5 p.m. was added alongside the market's first weekend morning newscasts. In 2003, WCTV began airing a half-hour 10 p.m. newscast on Fox affiliate WTLH (channel 49).

A digital subchannel of WCTV became the UPN affiliate for the Tallahassee market in 2005, after WTLF (channel 24) dropped the affiliation. Gray already had UPN subchannel affiliations in three markets. After UPN and The WB merged in 2006 to form The CW, Gray affiliated the subchannel with MyNetworkTV.

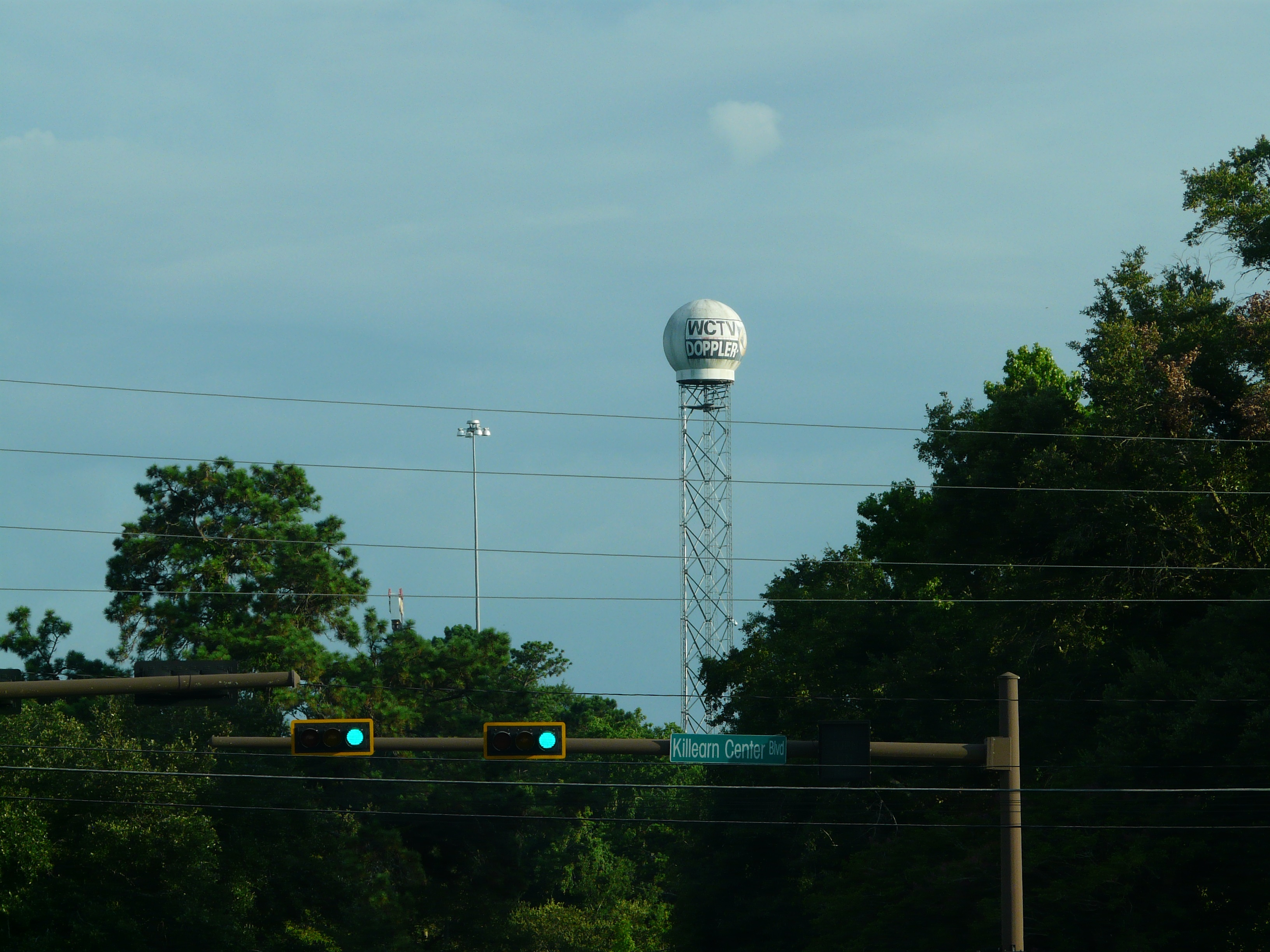
WCTV Doppler weather radar

WCTV vacated its tower site studio in 2006 and moved operations to a more central facility in Tallahassee. The building on Halstead Boulevard, near Capital Circle Northeast, had previously housed Florida's News Channel, a cable news operation. A newer and more powerful radar system was also installed at the site. The station continued to produce local news on Fox after "Fox 49" moved to a subchannel of WTWC-TV, including a 7 a.m. morning news hour, until 2026 when they moved to Gray-owned WFXU (channel 57).

In 2020, Gray built WNXG-LD, a low-power test bed for ATSC 3.0 (NextGen TV) technologies, in Tallahassee. The station initially aired subchannels from all of Gray's local stations.

=== Albany-market satellite ===
In 2005, Gray acquired WVAG (channel 44) in Valdosta, Georgia, a UPN affiliate serving the Albany market. Under Gray, the station was renamed WSWG, for Southwest Georgia, in November 2005. WCTV oversaw operations of the station. In December 2005, Gray announced that it would add CBS programming to a digital subchannel of WSWG, the first-ever CBS affiliation with a subchannel. However, when The WB and UPN announced their merger into The CW in 2006, these plans changed. Instead, CBS was broadcast as the station's primary service, with MyNetworkTV on a subchannel. In 2018, Gray merged with Raycom Media, which had owned WALB-TV since merging with Cosmos parent Liberty Corporation in 2006; it was forced to divest one Albany-market station and chose WSWG, which was sold to Marquee Broadcasting and ceased airing news programming from WCTV.

== Notable former on-air staff ==
- Gene Deckerhoff – sports anchor, 1977–1983
- Tom Dunn – anchor, c. 1959
- Julie Moran – reporter, 1980 (known as Julie Bryant at WCTV)
- Mary Jo West – reporter, early 1970s (known as Mary Jo Hall at WCTV)

== Technical information and subchannels ==
=== WCTV ===
WCTV broadcasts from a tower southeast of Metcalfe, Georgia, along the Florida–Georgia state line.

Subchannels of WCTV
Subchannel	Res.	Short name	Programming
6.1	1080i	WCTVDT	CBS
6.2	480i	WCTVDT2	MeTV
6.3	480i	The365	365BLK
6.4	480i	ION	Ion
6.5	480i	TruCrim	True Crime Network
6.6	480i	MyNet	WFXU (Independent with MyNetworkTV)
6.7	480i	ThisTV	Shop LC

Simulcast of subchannels of another station

WCTV began digital broadcasting by August 2004 on channel 46. It shut down its analog signal on February 17, 2009, the original target digital television transition date. WCTV moved to channel 20 on July 3, 2020, as a result of the 2016 United States wireless spectrum auction.

=== WNXG-LD ===
WNXG-LD's tower is located at a site along Thomasville Road (US 319) northeast of Tallahassee. (Note: This site was the previous studio facility for WTXL-TV, which that station vacated in 2002 when it combined operations with WTWC-TV. Gray bought the site with the intention of putting a new WCTV studio there, going as far as to file development plans with Leon County.)

Subchannels of WNXG-LD (ATSC 3.0)
Subchannel	Res.	Short name	Programming
38.1	1080i	WCTV-DT	CBS
38.2	1080i	WCTVDT2	MeTV
38.3	1080i	WCTVDT3	365BLK
38.4	1080i	WCTVDT4	Ion
38.5	480i	WCTVDT5	True Crime Network

Simulcast of subchannels of another station
