= Metcalfe, Georgia =

Metcalfe
- Village
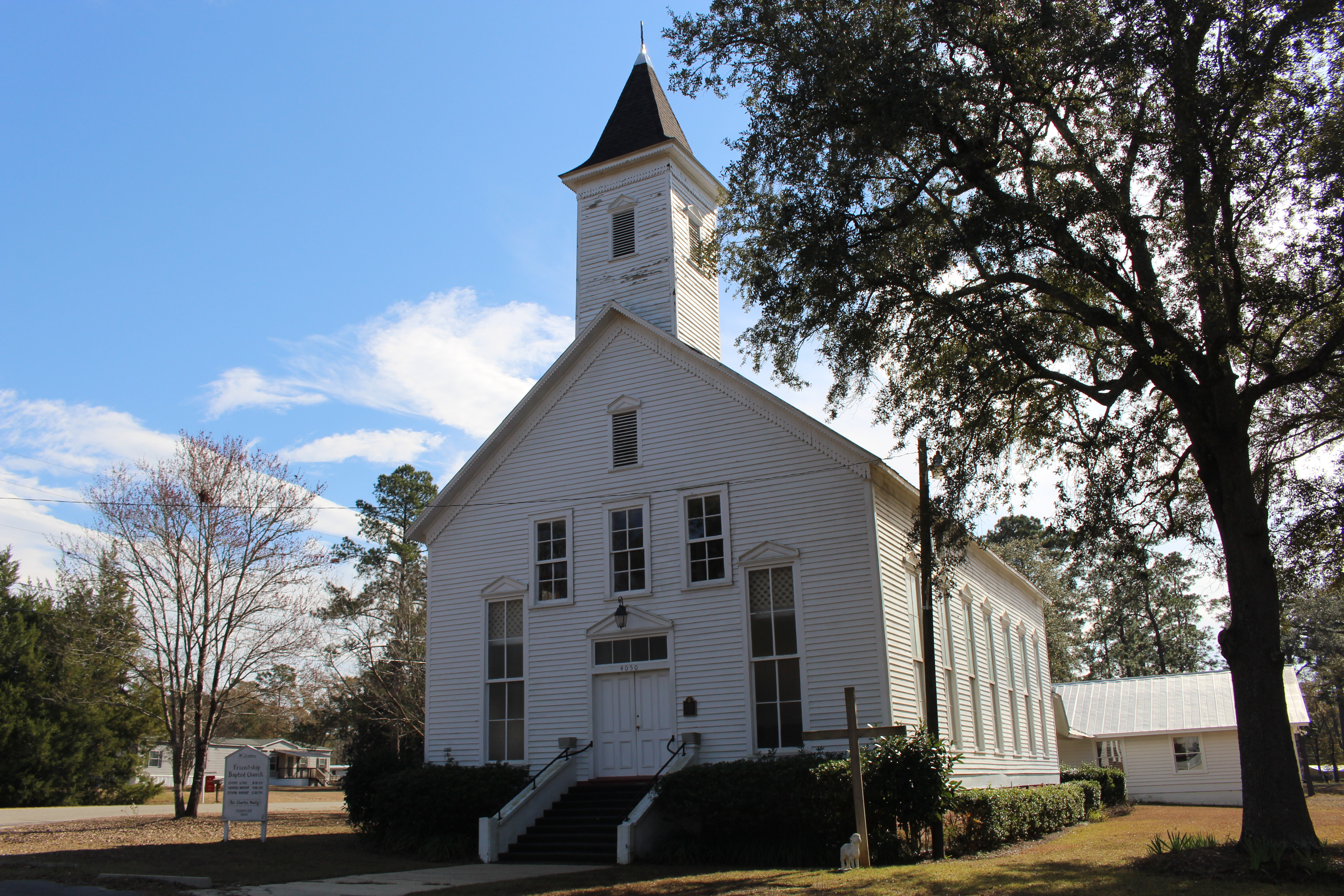
- Friendship Baptist Church

- Location within the state of Georgia Metcalfe (the United States)
- Coordinates: 30°42′1″N 83°59′17″W
- Country: United States
- State: Georgia
- County: Thomas
- Time zone: UTC-6 (Eastern Time Zone)
  - Summer (DST): UTC-5 (EDT)

Metcalfe is a small village in southwestern Georgia, United States. The WCTV Tower, the tallest structure in Georgia, is located near Metcalfe. The lumberyard closed in 2023 and is located on the main highway. There are two churches located in Metcalfe, Friendship Baptist and Metcalfe Methodist Church. Friendship Baptist is one of the oldest congregations in the Georgia Baptist Convention. Founded in 1848, approximately two miles outside of the township of Metcalfe, it was moved to the present site in 1890. The name of the village is commonly and erroneously spelled without the final "e." The Metcalfe Historic District is listed on the National Register of Historic Places.

The correct spelling is "Metcalfe," reflecting the fact that it was named in honor of John Thomas Metcalfe, M.D.

This town was also featured in Alfred Hitchcock's film Strangers on a Train.
