= Mass media in Columbus, Georgia =

Below is a list of the media in the Columbus Metro Area in Columbus, Georgia.

== Television ==
Bold denotes full-power television stations in the Columbus metro area.

Call sign	Channel	Affiliation	Owner
**WRBL**	**3** 3.2	**CBS** Me-TV	**Nexstar Media Group**
WCIQ	7	PBS	Alabama Educational Television Commission
**WTVM**	**9** 9.2	**ABC** Bounce TV	**Gray Television**
WYBU	16	Religious	CTN
WACS	25	PBS	Georgia Public Broadcasting
**WJSP**	**28**	**PBS**	**Georgia Public Broadcasting**
**WLTZ**	**38** 38.2	**NBC** The CW	**SagamoreHill Broadcasting**
WGIQ	43	PBS	Alabama Educational Television Commission
WHOT-TV	47.3	Antenna TV	CNZ Communications, LLC
**WXTX**	**54** 54.2	**Fox** Live Well Network	**American Spirit Media**

== Radio ==
=== AM broadcasting ===
Call sign	Frequency	Format
WDAK	540	News Talk Information
WACQ	580	Gospel
WZMG	910	Urban adult contemporary
WAUD	1230	Sports, Music, News, Talk
WBOJ	1270	Sports
WOKS	1340	Rhythmic oldies
WRCG	1420	Classic rock
WHTY	1460	Adult contemporary
WTLM	1520	Oldies
WIOL	1580	Sports

=== FM broadcasting ===
Call sign	Frequency	Format
WJSP	88.1	Public radio
WCUG	88.5	University Radio
WELL	88.7	Contemporary Christian
WYFK	89.5	Religious
WLGA	90.5	Christian
WEGL	91.1	Variety
WTJB	91.7	Classical
WLTC-HD2	92.1	Sports
WKZJ	92.7	Urban adult contemporary
WVFJ	93.3	Contemporary Christian
WQSI	93.9	Classic country
WMJB	95.3	Christian
WIOL	95.7	Sports
WTGZ	95.9	Modern rock
WMXA	96.7	Adult contemporary
WURY	97.1	Religious
WAUF-LP	97.3	Contemporary Christian
WKKR	97.7	Country
WBFA	98.3	Urban contemporary
WKCN	99.3	Country
WQNR	99.9	Variety hits
WGSY	100.1	Urban contemporary
WEAM	100.7	Gospel
WCJM	100.9	Country
WAGH	101.3	Urban adult contemporary
WVRK	102.9	Album-oriented rock
WLTC	103.7	Light rock
WFXE	104.9	Urban contemporary
WSTH	106.1	Country
WRCG	106.9	Classic rock
WCGQ	107.3	Contemporary hits

== Newspapers ==
- The Bayonet, a weekly publication of news and events in Fort Benning and south Columbus
- The Chattahoochee Voice, Columbus' only solely online newspaper, serving Metro Columbus since 2016
- The Columbus Times, a weekly publication featuring African-American perspectives of current events
- The Ledger-Enquirer, the only daily newspaper in Columbus
- The LocaL, a monthly magazine featuring art and entertainment news and features
- Playgrounds Magazine, a monthly entertainment and arts magazine (closed in 2017)
- The Uproar, the Columbus State University campus newspaper
- Tid Bits, a weekly publication featuring news throughout the southeast
- To Do, a weekly publication featuring current events
- The Final Call, a newspaper founded by Minister Louis Farrakhan in 1979. In Columbus, Georgia.

== See also ==
- Columbus, Georgia
- Georgia media
  - List of newspapers in Georgia (U.S. state)
  - List of radio stations in Georgia (U.S. state)
  - List of television stations in Georgia (U.S. state)
  - Media of cities in Georgia: Athens, Atlanta, Augusta, Macon, Savannah
