= WIOL =

WIOL may refer to:

- WIOL (AM), a radio station (1580 AM) licensed to Columbus, Georgia, United States
- WIOL-FM, a radio station (95.7 FM) licensed to Waverly Hall, Georgia, United States
- WKZJ, a radio station (92.7 FM) licensed to Eufaula, Alabama, United States, which used the call sign WIOL from 1999 until 2005
- WSMM (AM), a radio station (850 AM) licensed to Knoxville, Tennessee, United States, which used the call sign WIOL from 1997 until 1998
