= WBIL =

WBIL may refer to:

- World Basic Information Library
- WACQ, a radio station (580 AM) licensed to Tuskegee, Alabama, which held the call sign WBIL until 2012
- WTGZ, a radio station (95.9 FM) licensed to Tuskegee, Alabama, which held the call sign WBIL-FM from 1978 to 1996
- WQBQ, a radio station (1410 AM) licensed to Leesburg, Florida, which held the call sign WBIL from 1962 to 1965
