= WCUG =

WCUG may refer to:

- WCUG (FM), a radio station (88.5 FM) licensed to serve Lumpkin, Georgia, United States
- WCUG (Cuthbert, Georgia), a defunct radio station (850 AM) formerly licensed to serve Cuthbert, Georgia
