= WHTY =

WHTY may refer to:

- WHTY (AM), a radio station (1460 AM) licensed to serve Phenix City, Alabama, United States
- WGSY, a radio station (100.1 FM) licensed to serve Phenix City, Alabama, United States, which held the call sign WHTY from 2018 to 2020
- WPOM, a radio station (1600 AM) licensed to serve Riviera Beach, Florida, United States, which held the call sign WHTY from 2010 to 2015
- WMXQ, a radio station (93.5 FM) licensed to serve Hartford City, Indiana, United States, which held the call sign WHTY from 1999 to 2009
