= WEAM =

WEAM may refer to:

- WEAM-FM, a radio station (100.7 FM) licensed to Buena Vista, Georgia, United States
- WIOL (AM), a radio station (1580 AM) licensed to Columbus, Georgia, United States, which used the call sign WEAM from 1985 until 2010
- WZHF, a radio station (1390 AM) formerly licensed to Arlington, Virginia, United States, which used the call sign WEAM from its founding in 1948 until 1984
