= ABC Columbus =

ABC Columbus may refer to:

- WSYX, the ABC television affiliate in Columbus, Ohio
- WTVM, the ABC television affiliate in Columbus, Georgia
