= 103.7 Lite FM =

103.7 Lite FM may refer to:

- KVIL, a radio station (103.7 FM) licensed to Highland Park, Texas, US
- WLTC, a radio station (103.7 FM) licensed to Cusseta, Georgia, US
