= WTVM =

Television station in Columbus, Georgia, United States

- Columbus, Georgia; United States
- Channels: Digital: 11 (VHF); Virtual: 9
- Branding: WTVM News Leader 9

Programming
- Affiliations: 9.1: ABC; for others, see § Subchannels

Ownership
- Owner: Gray Media; (Gray Television Licensee, LLC)
- Sister stations: WLTZ, WXTX

History
- First air date: October 6, 1953
- Former call signs: WDAK-TV (1953–1957)
- Former channel numbers: Analog: 28 (UHF, 1953–1960), 9 (VHF, 1960–2009); Digital: 47 (UHF, 2003–2009)
- Former affiliations: NBC (primary 1953–1960, secondary 1960–1970); DuMont (secondary, 1953–1955)
- Call sign meaning: Television Martin (from Martin Theaters, former owner)

Technical information
- Licensing authority: FCC
- Facility ID: 595
- ERP: 30.99 kW
- HAAT: 554 m (1,818 ft)
- Transmitter coordinates: 32°19′16.4″N 84°47′28.2″W
- Translator(s): WCGZ-LD 20 Lanett, Alabama; WCTA-LD 32 Columbus

Links
- Public license information: Public file; LMS
- Website: www.wtvm.com

WTVM (channel 9) is a television station in Columbus, Georgia, United States, affiliated with ABC. It is owned by Gray Media alongside NBC/CW+ affiliate WLTZ (channel 38) and Fox affiliate WXTX (channel 54). WTVM and WXTX share studios on Wynnton Road (GA 22) in the Dinglewood section of Columbus; WTVM's transmitter is located in Cusseta, Georgia.

WTVM is Columbus's first and oldest TV station. Founded by a joint venture of Columbus radio station WDAK and the Martin Theaters chain, it began broadcasting as WDAK-TV on UHF channel 28 on October 6, 1953—more than a month before WRBL—and was affiliated with NBC, ABC, and the DuMont Television Network. Martin became the sole owner in 1957 and changed the call sign to WTVM. It also successfully campaigned for a second VHF channel to be assigned to Columbus to give WTVM parity with WRBL. In November 1960, WTVM moved to channel 9 from the newly built Cusseta tower and changed its primary network affiliation from NBC to ABC, though NBC programs continued to air on a secondary basis for another decade.

Under Martin and Fuqua Industries, WTVM was generally the second-rated TV station in the city, but during the ownership of Western Broadcasting, WTVM beat WRBL in the news ratings for the first time. During the ownership of the SFN Companies and their successor Pegasus Broadcasting, between 1984 and 1989, WTVM rose to become a dominant first-place news station. It was acquired by the broadcast division of Columbus-based insurer Aflac in 1989, by Raycom Media in 1997, and Gray in 2019.

== History ==
=== Construction and early history ===
In 1951, when the Federal Communications Commission (FCC) released a draft of TV channel assignments, it allocated two commercial TV channels to Columbus, Georgia: VHF channel 4 and UHF channel 28. There was only one television application on file with the commission at that time, from Columbus radio station WGBA. WDAK and WRBL opted to wait until the FCC lifted its then-pending freeze on new stations. After the commission lifted the freeze, all three announced they would file for TV stations, as did Martin Theaters, a chain of movie houses. WRBL and WGBA sought channel 4, while WDAK and Martin Theaters filed for channel 28.

WDAK and Martin merged their channel 28 applications as Television Columbus on September 24, 1952, an action that promised to hasten the arrival of television to the city. Those hopes were dashed when WPNX in Phenix City, Alabama, filed its own channel 28 application on October 8, sending the matter back to the hearing stage and leading to statements of frustration from Television Columbus officials. Civic groups in Columbus, Phenix City, and other areas petitioned WPNX to withdraw so as to speed the arrival of television in Columbus on the WDAK–Martin application, a petition WPNX heeded on March 4, 1953. Eight days later, on March 12, the FCC awarded a construction permit to Television Columbus. A site on the edge of Phenix City was selected for the transmitter facility, while studios were set up in a former car dealer building at 13th Street and First Avenue in downtown Columbus. The station signed for affiliation with all four networks: NBC, CBS, ABC, and the DuMont Television Network.

The first test patterns were broadcast on September 13. October 6 was Television Day in Columbus as WDAK-TV formally went on the air with its first regular programs. It was the only television station in Columbus for just over a month, as WRBL-TV began on channel 4 on November 15. It took the CBS affiliation, leaving WDAK-TV with NBC, ABC, and DuMont. In May 1954, Columbus's stations were linked directly to live national programming. That year, Martin became the 75-percent owner of WDAK-TV. DuMont ceased its existence as a network in 1955. Martin acquired the remainder of WDAK-TV in April 1957, resulting in the station changing call signs to WTVM (Television Martin) on May 10.

Though Columbus now had two television stations, they operated on unequal footing. Early UHF stations, such as WDAK-TV/WTVM, struggled, particularly in "intermixed" markets like Columbus where they competed with VHF stations. National advertisers were unconvinced of their selling power, even though channel 28 had higher ratings and most sets in the market were converted to receive UHF. The FCC's attempts to propose deintermixture in markets nationwide divided WRBL and WTVM. WTVM first proposed making Columbus an all-UHF market, but it later changed its stance to suggest a second VHF channel be allocated. Though WRBL fought to retain channel 4, WTVM's plan called for moving WRBL to channel 3, giving channel 4 to WTVY at Dothan, and moving channel 9 from Dothan to Columbus for use by WTVM. WRBL joined in WTVM's plan with a proposal to build a joint transmission tower at Cusseta, Georgia, for regional coverage. What started as a routine application at one point looked in doubt when four FCC commissioners balked at the two-VHF plan and supported moving WRBL-TV to UHF, which would have removed an estimated 35,000 to 40,000 viewers from its service area. Broadcasting magazine reported the commissioners to be "hopelessly divided". City leaders in Columbus lobbied against making the market all-UHF.

The FCC broke the logjam at the start of June 1959 and voted to enact the WTVM plan, granting Columbus and Baton Rouge, Louisiana, a second VHF channel each. There were two problems that delayed action on the change. WTVY protested, claiming it could not move to channel 4 at its present transmitter site, and one possible tower site for WRBL and WTVM was ruled out when officials building the Georgia Educational Television network opted to move the planned transmitter for Savannah, also on channel 9, to the west—an action that broke necessary separation. However, final approval for the channel changes and Cusseta transmitter site was granted in February 1960. WRBL was the first station to use the Cusseta tower, moving to channel 3 on October 27, 1960. WTVY moved to channel 4 on November 3 and WTVM to channel 9 the next day. The expanded coverage area of WTVM when it moved to the VHF band prompted station management to rethink their network affiliation. Citing higher duplication of NBC programming by stations in surrounding cities and that ABC "offered more and greater, unduplicated programs", in 1960 WTVM flipped from primary NBC, secondary ABC affiliation to primary ABC, secondary NBC. Prior to the advent of WYEA-TV (channel 38), WRBL and WTVM split NBC programming in the Columbus area.

The tower, completed to a height of 1,260 feet (380 m), was raised to 1,749 feet (533 m) in 1962. It was the tallest tower until 1964, when a 2,000-foot tower was erected for a TV station in North Dakota.

=== Fuqua ownership ===
In August 1968, J. B. Fuqua's company Fuqua Industries announced it would merge with Martin Theaters, which by that time owned 150 theaters, WTVM, and WTVC in Chattanooga, Tennessee. The merger received FCC approval in February 1969. One of Fuqua's first moves was to relocate WTVM. Construction began in October 1969 on a new studio building on Wynnton Road, which was occupied in September 1970. The 19,889-square-foot (1,847.7 m^{2}) facility provided more room for the expanding WTVM operation and featured two indoor studios and a third outdoor studio.

Fuqua Industries put its broadcasting properties on the market in 1979 after finding that they had appreciated in value to the point where the company had to consider selling them. WTVM was sold to Western Broadcasting Company of Missoula, Montana, in a $19.5 million deal announced in December 1979 and closed in September 1980.

During this time, WTVM's local newscasts became truly competitive for the first time, in a market that had long been dominated by WRBL. In 1976, the station rebranded its newscasts Action 9 News. WTVM had aired its news at 6 p.m. and WRBL at 7 p.m. until 1977, when WTVM attempted to go head-to-head with WRBL at 7. The move failed, with general manager Lynn Avery citing the incompatibility of the 7 p.m. slot with his station's younger audience. In 1980 and 1981, WTVM had a higher audience share than WRBL at 6 and 11 p.m. WRBL responded with a news department refresh, including introducing a third weeknight local newscast, and remained competitive.

Western Broadcasting's owner, Dale Moore, died in a 1981 plane crash in Idaho. In 1984, the publishing company SFN Companies acquired Western Broadcasting, marking the firm's entry into broadcasting and allowing for the settling of Moore's estate. SFN brought an infusion of resources to WTVM, including an overhaul of senior management and a more aggressive stance to purchasing syndicated programming. This included the January 1986 hiring of WRBL news anchor Dick McMichael, who had been associated with channel 3 in several stints since its startup in 1953. McMichael noted that he was "impressed with Channel 9's future plans and obvious commitment to excellent news coverage and presentation". The effect of McMichael's defection on the Columbus news ratings race was immediate. In November 1985, WRBL had a 32% share of the 6 p.m. news audience and WTVM 27% in the Columbus area of dominant influence. Two years later, WRBL had 21% and WTVM 45%.

SFN managers, including the general manager of WTVM, led a buyout of the company's broadcasting properties in 1986 to form Commacq Inc. The buyout plan was formed when SFN found a buyer for WTVM and the company's station in San Juan, Puerto Rico, that the managers felt was not "seriously committed to good broadcasting". By the time the sale closed, Commacq was known as Pegasus Broadcasting. In 1989, WTVM was the first Columbus TV station to have a Black full-time anchorwoman on its evening weeknight newscasts: Dee Armstrong, who had been a reporter and weekend anchor.

=== Aflac ownership ===
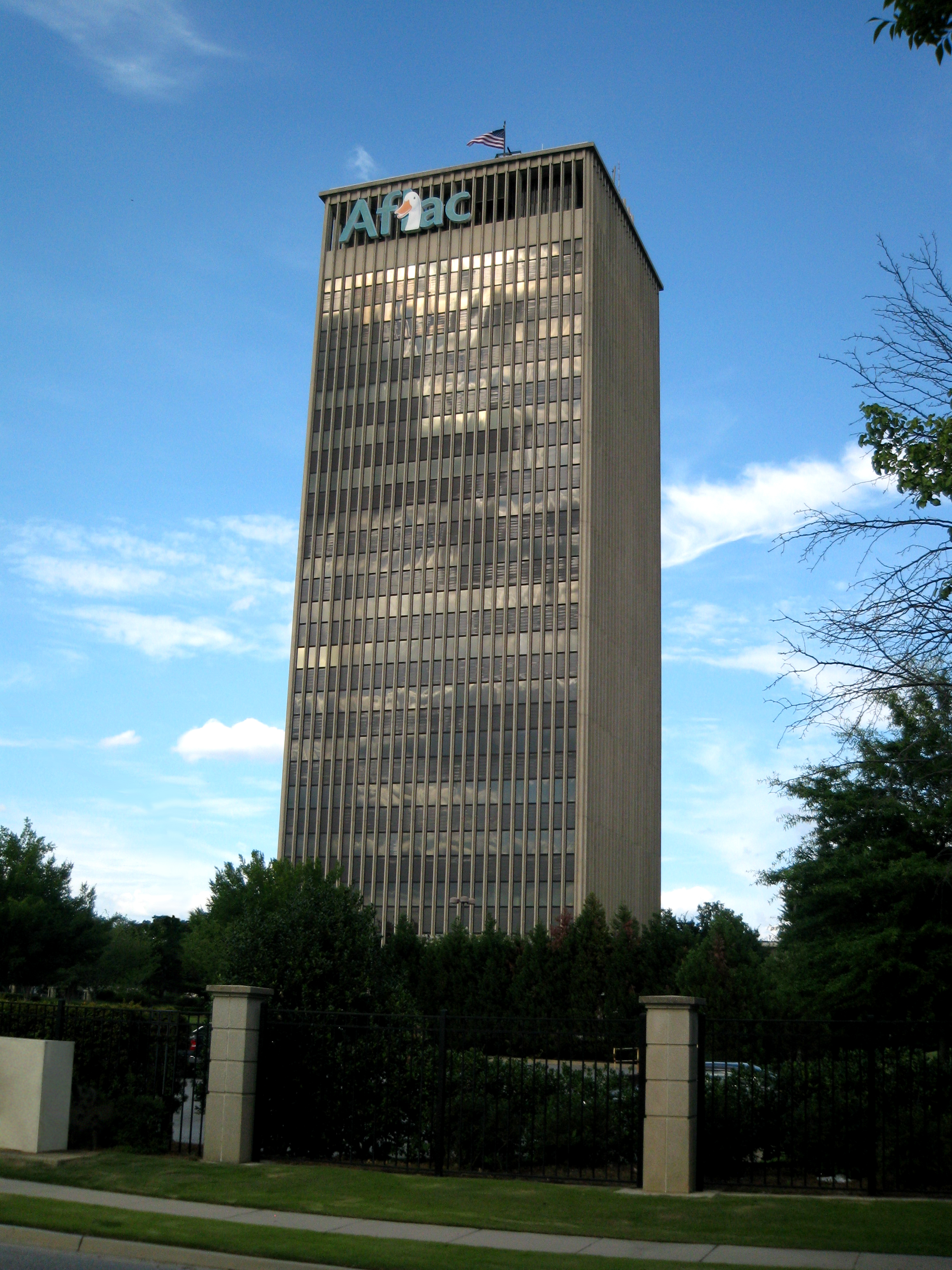
Aflac (headquarters building pictured) owned WTVM from 1989 to 1997. This building is across the street from the WTVM studios.

On October 7, 1988, the American Family Life Assurance Company (Aflac), (Note: Though shortened "American Family" or "AmFam" in the media at the time, in October 1988 the insurance division began using the acronym AFLAC to avoid confusion with similarly named companies, including Madison, Wisconsin–based American Family Insurance. In 1991, American Family Corporation voted to rename itself AFLAC Inc. The American Family Broadcast Group was legally renamed AFLAC Broadcast Group, Inc., in 1993.) a Columbus-based insurer whose headquarters are across the street from the WTVM studio, announced it was buying WTVM from Pegasus Broadcasting for $45 million. It was a return to local broadcasting for Aflac, which had from 1978 to 1981 owned channel 38 as WYEA-TV. Though company president John Amos had feared that owning a local TV station would cause people to view its news reporting as a house organ for the insurer, he no longer held the same qualms. WTVM differed from WYEA in one respect: it was the number-one TV station in the city, like other stations American Family owned, whereas WYEA—in spite of a serious upgrading of the news department—was hampered by its signal and poor competitive position. Leroy Paul, who presided over Aflac's broadcast division, quipped in 1995 that the experience of owning channel 38 prompted the company to learn "we could never become the city's news leader on a UHF station".

Under Aflac, WTVM continued to be the dominant TV news station in Columbus, regularly attracting more than half of the 6 p.m. news audience. In November 1990, WTVM's 6 p.m. news earned an audience share of 59%, a 24-percentage-point increase from May 1988, and it commanded 43% of news viewers at 11 p.m. In 1994, a 5 p.m. newscast, First News, was added, as was a morning newscast.

=== Raycom and Gray ownership ===
In 1997, Aflac sold its entire broadcasting division, including WTVM, to Raycom Media, an investment group backed by the Retirement Systems of Alabama (RSA) pension fund. WTVM became involved in the operation of a second Columbus station after Southeastern Media Holdings Inc.—subsidiary of newspaper publisher Community Newspaper Holdings, Inc., another RSA-backed company—acquired Columbus Fox affiliate WXTX (channel 54) in 2003. Southeastern entered into a local marketing agreement with Raycom to manage the station. By March 2004, WXTX was airing a 10 p.m. newscast from WTVM.

Raycom merged with Gray Television in a deal announced in 2018 and finalized in 2019. In September 2020, SagamoreHill Broadcasting entered into an eight-year shared services agreement with Gray to provide WLTZ with back-office services including master control, engineering services, and promotional services, as well as newscasts; some of WTVM's newscasts began to simulcast on channel 38.

== Notable former on-air staff ==
- Cy Follmer – sports director, 1965
- Georgia Fort – reporter and weekend anchor, 2015–2017; known as Georgia Ellyse in Columbus
- Maria LaRosa – meteorologist, 1998
- Deborah Roberts – reporter, 1982–1985

== Subchannels ==
WTVM's transmitter is located in Cusseta, Georgia. The station's signal is multiplexed:

Subchannels of WTVM
| Channel | Res. | Short name | Programming |
|---|---|---|---|
| 9.1 | 720p | WTVM | ABC |
| 9.2 | 480i | Bounce | Bounce TV |
| 9.3 | 720p | PSN | Peachtree Sports Network |
| 9.4 | 480i | Grit | Grit |
| 9.5 | 480i | Quest | Quest |
| 9.6 | 480i | WTVM365 | 365BLK |
| 9.7 | 480i | Oxygen | Oxygen |

== Translators ==
Two UHF-band translators, WCTA-LD in Columbus (on the WLTZ tower in Columbus) and WCGZ-LD (licensed to Lanett, Alabama, and broadcasting from a tower in LaGrange, Georgia), broadcast WTVM's main subchannel and Peachtree Sports Network as well as Telemundo.

Subchannels of WCTA-LD and WCGZ-LD
| Subchannel | Res. | Short name | Programming |
|---|---|---|---|
| 9.10 | 720p | WTVM | ABC (WTVM 9.1) |
| 47.2 | 1080p | TLMDO | Telemundo |
| 47.3 | 720p | PSN | Peachtree Sports Network |
| 47.4 | 480i | OUTLAW | Outlaw |
