= Fox 54 =

Fox 54 may refer to one of the following television stations in the United States affiliated with the Fox Broadcasting Company:

- WFXG in Augusta, Georgia
- WXTX in Columbus, Georgia
- WZDX in Huntsville, Alabama
