= NBC Columbus =

NBC Columbus can refer to:

- WCMH-TV, the NBC television affiliate in Columbus, Ohio.
- WLTZ, the NBC television affiliate in Columbus, Georgia.
