= WSHE =

WSHE may refer to:

- WSHE (AM), a radio station (820 AM) licensed to serve Frederick, Maryland, United States
- WCLB, a radio station (950 AM) licensed to serve Sheboygan, Wisconsin, which held the call sign WSHE from 1954 to 1958
- WQDR (AM), a radio station (570 AM) licensed to serve Raleigh, North Carolina, which held the call sign WSHE from 1959 to 1962
- WBOJ, a radio station (1270 AM) licensed to serve Columbus, Georgia, United States, which held the call sign WSHE from 2004 to 2015
- WMIB, a radio station (103.5 FM) licensed to serve Fort Lauderdale, Florida, United States, which held the call signs WSHE from 1972 to 1996 and WSHE-FM from 2012 to 2013
- WRUM, a radio station (100.3 FM) licensed to serve Orlando, Florida, United States, which held the call sign WSHE from 1996 to 2004
- WWPX-TV, a television station (channel 12/PSIP 60) licensed to serve Martinsburg, West Virginia, United States, which held the call sign WSHE-TV from 1996 to 1998
- WTBC-FM, a radio station (100.3 FM) licensed to serve Chicago, Illinois, United States, which held the call sign WSHE-FM from 2015 to 2024
