= WRBL =

Television station in Columbus, Georgia, United States

- Columbus, Georgia; United States
- Channels: Digital: 15 (UHF); Virtual: 3
- Branding: WRBL 3; WRBL News 3

Programming
- Affiliations: 3.1: CBS; for others, see § Subchannels

Ownership
- Owner: Nexstar Media Group; (Nexstar Media Inc.)

History
- First air date: November 15, 1953
- Former call signs: WRBL-TV (1953–1980)
- Former channel numbers: Analog: 4 (VHF, 1953–1960), 3 (VHF, 1960–2009)
- Call sign meaning: Sequential assignment to WRBL radio in 1928

Technical information
- Licensing authority: FCC
- Facility ID: 3359
- ERP: 1,000 kW
- HAAT: 507 m (1,663 ft)
- Transmitter coordinates: 32°19′16″N 84°47′28″W

Links
- Public license information: Public file; LMS
- Website: www.wrbl.com

WRBL (channel 3) is a television station in Columbus, Georgia, United States, affiliated with CBS and owned by Nexstar Media Group. Its studios are located on 13th Avenue in Columbus, and its transmitter is located in Cusseta.

WRBL went on the air on November 15, 1953, as a sister station to WRBL radio and the second TV station in Columbus. It was approved as a result of the merger of the applications of the R. W. Page Corporation, publisher of the Ledger-Enquirer newspapers in Columbus, and the Woodruff family, which had owned WRBL radio. It was an affiliate of CBS from the outset and broadcast on channel 4 until 1960, when it moved to channel 3 as part of a reallocation that moved channel 9 to the city for use by WTVM. The two stations jointly built the present tower in Cusseta that briefly was the world's tallest structure.

Through the early 1980s, WRBL was the leading station in Columbus with popular local personalities. The station's fortunes began to change with the 1976 death of company president James W. Woodruff Jr. The family sold WRBL-TV to Malcolm Glazer's Avant Corporation in 1978. Under Avant, the station initially remained competitive in spite of increased newsroom turnover and low wages, in a competitive ratings race with WTVM. In January 1986, longtime WRBL anchor Dick McMichael defected to WTVM. The impact was immediate, and WTVM became the dominant news station in Columbus within two years. Under a succession of owners—TCS Television Partners, Spartan Communications, Media General, and Nexstar—this has remained the case, with WRBL a distant second.

== The Woodruff years ==
=== Construction and early history ===
In 1951, when the Federal Communications Commission (FCC) released a draft of TV channel assignments, it allocated two commercial TV channels to Columbus, Georgia: VHF channel 4 and UHF channel 28. There was only one television application on file with the commission at that time, from Columbus radio station WGBA. WDAK and WRBL opted to wait until the FCC lifted its then-pending freeze on new stations. After the commission lifted the freeze, all three announced they would file for TV stations, as did Martin Theaters, a chain of movie houses. WRBL and WGBA sought channel 4, while WDAK and Martin Theaters filed for channel 28. The application from WRBL's parent, the Columbus Broadcasting Company, specified affiliation with CBS and use of its existing studios, which were designed with a view to potential television use.

WDAK and Martin merged their channel 28 applications on September 24, 1952, and the next day the FCC ordered a comparative hearing on the WRBL and WGBA applications for channel 4. The applications never reached the hearing stage, as on August 25, 1953, the two stations announced a merger. The R. W. Page Corporation, publisher of the Ledger-Enquirer newspapers in Columbus and owner of WGBA, would take an ownership stake in the WRBL stations and surrender the WGBA stations. The involvement of the newspapers spurred a petition against the application from officials in Phenix City, Alabama, across the Chattahoochee River from Columbus. The Phenix City leaders charged that the Ledger and Enquirer were negatively slanted in their coverage of issues on the Alabama side of the river and that the combination would give the Page Corporation undue control of the local media. The newspaper denied the allegations, and Columbus Broadcasting adopted a resolution promising balanced news coverage. A majority of the FCC voted to ignore the protest and granted Columbus Broadcasting Company a construction permit on September 24, 1953. As part of the process, Page applied to sell WGBA to a Phenix City group, giving that city its first nighttime radio station.

The first test pattern from WRBL-TV was broadcast on November 8, 46 days after receiving final FCC approval. The first programs were broadcast a week later, on November 15, even though the tower and final full-power facility were not yet complete. It was Columbus's second TV station. Channel 28 had gone on as WDAK-TV after WDAK and Martin Theaters merged their applications and was affiliated with NBC, ABC, and the DuMont Television Network. However, only WRBL at the outset had the ability to receive live network programming, thanks to its microwave relay atop Pine Mountain. In May 1954, Columbus's stations were linked directly to live national programming. The next year, WRBL-TV began broadcasting with the maximum allotted power of 100,000 watts.

Though Columbus now had two television stations, they operated on unequal footing. Early UHF stations, such as WDAK-TV, struggled, particularly in "intermixed" markets like Columbus where they competed with VHF stations. National advertisers were unconvinced of their selling power, even though WDAK had higher ratings and most sets in the market were converted to receive UHF. The FCC's attempts to propose deintermixture in markets nationwide divided WRBL and WDAK-TV, which was renamed WTVM in May 1957 after Martin became the sole owner. WTVM first proposed making Columbus an all-UHF market, but it later changed its stance to suggest a second VHF channel be allocated. Though WRBL fought to retain channel 4, WTVM's plan called for moving WRBL to channel 3, giving channel 4 to WTVY at Dothan, and moving channel 9 from Dothan to Columbus for use by WTVM. WRBL joined in WTVM's plan with a proposal to build a joint transmission tower at Cusseta, Georgia, for regional coverage. What started as a routine application at one point looked in doubt when four FCC commissioners balked at the two-VHF plan and supported moving WRBL-TV to UHF, which would have removed an estimated 35,000 to 40,000 viewers from its service area. Broadcasting magazine reported the commissioners to be "hopelessly divided". City leaders in Columbus lobbied against making the market all-UHF.

The FCC broke the logjam at the start of June 1959 and voted to enact the WTVM plan, granting Columbus and Baton Rouge, Louisiana, a second VHF channel each. There were two problems that delayed action on the change. WTVY protested, claiming it could not move to channel 4 at its present transmitter site, and one possible tower site for WRBL and WTVM was ruled out when officials building the Georgia Educational Television network opted to move the planned transmitter for Savannah, also on channel 9, to the west—an action that broke necessary separation. However, final approval for the channel changes and Cusseta transmitter site was granted in February 1960. WRBL was the first station to use the Cusseta tower, moving to channel 3 on October 27, 1960. WTVY moved to channel 4 on November 3 and WTVM to channel 9 the next day. The tower, completed to a height of 1,260 feet (380 m), was raised to 1,749 feet (533 m) in 1962. It was the tallest tower until 1964, when a 2,000-foot tower was erected for a TV station in North Dakota. In the 1960s, prior to the advent of WYEA-TV (channel 38), WRBL and WTVM split NBC programming in the Columbus area.

In its ownership under the Woodruff family, WRBL-TV established a reputation as a traditional station with a loyal staff and a strong community and public service orientation in spite of low wages. It was the perennial news ratings leader in Columbus, though its newscasts were criticized for being boring in style—mocked as "Snooze News"—and critics accused the station of having a pro-military bias, in keeping with the Woodruffs' involvement with the Association of the United States Army. In 1973, the Woodruffs bought out the R. W. Page Company, returning the WRBL stations to full family ownership for the first time in two decades. Weather presenter Doug Wallace, who had been with the station since its inception, retired from the position in 1977.

== Avant years ==
James W. Woodruff Jr. was badly injured in a car accident in Athens, Georgia, on October 2, 1976. He died of his injuries two weeks later. The death marked the beginning of the end for the Columbus Broadcasting Company, which proceeded to sell the WRBL stations piecemeal. WRBL AM was sold in January 1977 and became WRCG; a year later, WRBL-FM was sold and became WVOC.

WRBL-TV was sold to the Avant Corporation of Rochester, New York, in 1978. The next year, the new ownership made a number of changes, firing a dozen employees, canceling and then uncanceling the outdoors feature Sportsman's Lodge in response to public outcry, and moving the evening newscast from its longtime 7 p.m. time slot to 6 p.m. Even though 6 p.m. was a more common time slot for news and the station claimed more local news viewers in the earlier slot, airing at 7 had allowed viewers in Alabama—in the Central Time Zone, an hour behind Columbus—to watch an early evening local newscast at a more convenient time.

Maybe the decline began with Woodruff's death. Maybe it was the self-destructive attitude of New Yorker Malcolm Glazer who bought the station in the early 1980s. Whatever the reason, the station slowly became a sham of its past.

— Richard Hyatt, Ledger-Enquirer, in 1998

After reinstating a 7 p.m. newscast in 1981 under the title More Eyewitness News, it was canceled in 1985. The 1985 news shuffling was seen as a demotion for anchor Dick McMichael. In January 1986, McMichael—who had been associated with WRBL on and off since 1953—announced he was leaving for WTVM, citing the station's plans for its news department. Days later, WRBL's general manager resigned after 28 years with the station in a variety of on- and off-air capacities. The effect of McMichael's defection on the Columbus news ratings race was immediate. In November 1985, WRBL had a 32% share of the 6 p.m. news audience and WTVM 27% in the Columbus area of dominant influence. Two years later, WRBL had 21% and WTVM 45%. During this time, WRBL general manager Joe V. Windsor, a former general manager at WTVM, resigned after five months on the job, with Avant's failure to follow through on promised investments in the newsroom emerging as the reason. Windsor's departure prompted the Ledger-Enquirer to run an editorial opining that Avant was "continu[ing] to slap cheap makeup" on what had once been "the grande dame of Columbus television". Morale sank as turnover accelerated.

Avant retooled other areas of the station. Weekend newscasts debuted in 1987, and the longstanding daytime talk program The Rozell Show, hosted by Rozell Fabiani, was canceled in January 1988 after a 33-year run amid declining ratings.

== 1990s and later ==
In 1988, Malcolm Glazer began seeking offers for WRBL and two other TV stations he owned: WTWO in Terre Haute, Indiana, and KQTV in St. Joseph, Missouri. The stations were sold for $60 million in 1990 to TCS Television Partners, a partnership of the owners of ML Media and Simon Gourdine, former NBA deputy commissioner and director of labor relations for the Metropolitan Transportation Authority. Under TCS, WRBL debuted the market's first morning newscast in 1992, beating WTVM to the time period by two years. Ratings for the evening news continued to decline; by 1993, channel 3's 6 p.m. news was beaten by Star Trek: The Next Generation on Fox affiliate WXTX (channel 54) and The Andy Griffith Show on WLTZ, even as WTVM set all-time ratings records in Columbus.

Gourdine exited his stake in TCS in 1993, two years before the company sold WRBL to Spartan Radiocasting of Spartanburg, South Carolina, in June 1995. The company renamed itself to Spartan Communications shortly after the sale. Under Jim Caruthers, the first general manager for WRBL under its new ownership, the station introduced a noon news program in 1997—its first local program in the time slot since The Rozell Show in a time slot where WTVM aired news. A 5 p.m. newscast was also added. However, the ratings situation did not change, with WTVM continuing to enjoy a commanding lead. Caruthers's replacement, Bob Page, brought back a number of personalities who had worked at WRBL and other Columbus stations, but had not been on the air in years, in an attempt to draw viewers.

On December 8, 1999, Spartan Communications agreed to be purchased by Media General for $605 million. The 5 p.m. news went from a half-hour to an hour in 2003, creating a 90-minute local news block and bringing WRBL's weekday news output to 3 1/2 hours. The news department's growth came to a halt during the Great Recession, as newscasts were canceled. By January 2009, the weekend newscasts had been discontinued. The weekday noon and 5 p.m. newscasts were canceled that April, leaving WRBL with three daily newscasts (6 a.m. and 6 and 11 p.m.) on weekdays only.

On September 8, 2015, Media General announced that it would acquire the Meredith Corporation, for $2.4 billion to form Meredith Media General. That sale was canceled on January 27, 2016, in favor of a sale of Media General to the Nexstar Broadcasting Group that was completed in January 2017.

WRBL opened a news bureau on Columbus State University's downtown campus in September 2018. The bureau, in the Carpenter Building, allowed interns from the university to work alongside WRBL's news staff. By 2024, the station was airing 26 1/2 hours a week of local news programming, including reinstated weekend, noon and 5 p.m. newscasts as well as weekend morning news.

== Notable former on-air staff ==
- Brenda Blackmon – reporter, 1973–1977
- Rece Davis – sports anchor, 1989–1993
- Janice Huff (known as Janice Wages at WRBL) – meteorologist, 1983–1987
- Daryll Jones – sports director, 1998
- Anne Montgomery (known as Anne Butler at WRBL) – sports reporter, 1983

== Subchannels ==
WRBL is broadcast from a tower in Cusseta, Georgia. The station's signal is multiplexed:

Subchannels of WRBL
Subchannel	Res.	Short name	Programming
3.1	1080i	WRBL-TV	CBS
3.2	480i	WRBL-BD	Busted
3.3	480i	WRBL-IO	Ion
3.4	480i	WRBL-LF	Laff
