= WCUG (FM) =

Radio station in Lumpkin–Columbus, Georgia, United States

- Lumpkin, Georgia; United States
- Broadcast area: Columbus, Georgia metropolitan area
- Frequency: 88.5 MHz
- Branding: Cougar Radio

Programming
- Format: Jazz, News, Sports and College

Ownership
- Owner: 88.5 The Truth Inc.; (88.5 The Truth, Inc.)

History
- First air date: April 15, 2008
- Former call signs: WTMQ (2002–2009); WBOJ (2009–2015)
- Call sign meaning: Cougar

Technical information
- Licensing authority: FCC
- Facility ID: 88005
- Class: C2
- ERP: 23,000 watts
- HAAT: 164 meters (538 ft)
- Transmitter coordinates: 31°59′19″N 84°55′59″W

Links
- Public license information: Public file; LMS
- Webcast: Listen Live
- Website: wcugradio.columbusstate.edu

WCUG (88.5 FM, "Cougar Radio") is a college radio radio station licensedLumpkin, Georgia and serving the metro area. A student-run station, WCUG is owned by the Columbus State University with studios on the university's RiverPark Campus.

== History ==
On December 26, 2009, 88.5 switched its format from latin music to a Contemporary Christian radio station branded as 88.5 The Truth with a callsign of WBOJ.

88.5 The Truth was put on the air by former WCGQ Programming Director/Air Talent Lee McCard who was the morning host until July 2009. Morning successor Heath Jackson was shot and killed at his home in September 2010, in a murder case which stunned Columbus. Police arrested a suspected burglar on murder charges.

In July 2015, the station moved its programming to 107.7 FM and 103.7 WLTC-HD3 and rebranded as 107.7 The Truth. This freed up 88.5 for use by Columbus State University.

On July 1, 2015, the station launched as Cougar Radio, with programming being handled by students and faculty of Columbus State's Department of Communication. The station's programming consists of various music genres including jazz, musical theater, video game sountracks and other programming. CSU obtained the station through a partnership with PMB Broadcasting. The broadcasting group is leasing the station's license to the university for $1 a year.
