= WLTZ =

Television station in Columbus, Georgia, United States

- Columbus, Georgia; United States
- Channels: Digital: 35 (UHF); Virtual: 38
- Branding: NBC 38, The CW Ga-Bama (38.2)

Programming
- Affiliations: 38.1: NBC; 38.2: The CW Plus; for others, see § Technical information and subchannels

Ownership
- Owner: Gray Media; (Gray Television Licensee, LLC)
- Sister stations: WTVM, WXTX

History
- First air date: October 29, 1970
- Former call signs: WYEA-TV (1970–1981)
- Former channel number: Analog: 38 (UHF, 1970–2009)

Technical information
- Licensing authority: FCC
- Facility ID: 37179
- ERP: 50 kW
- HAAT: 377.2 m (1,238 ft)
- Transmitter coordinates: 32°27′28″N 84°53′8″W

Links
- Public license information: Public file; LMS
- Website: www.wltz.com; www.CW-GABama.com (38.2)

WLTZ (channel 38) is a television station in Columbus, Georgia, United States, affiliated with NBC and The CW Plus. It is owned by Gray Media alongside ABC affiliate WTVM (channel 9) and Fox affiliate WXTX (channel 54). WLTZ's studios and transmitter are located on NBC 38 Drive off Buena Vista Road on the east side of the city. Master control and most internal operations are based at WTVM and WXTX's shared studios on Wynnton Road (GA 22) in the Dinglewood section of Columbus.

WLTZ went on the air in 1970 as WYEA-TV. An NBC affiliate from its first day on air, it has spent most of its history in a distant third in local news ratings in the Columbus market, despite attempts from several owners—most notably locally based insurer American Family Corporation, then former Savannah mayor Julius Curtis Lewis Jr.—to improve the situation. Under Lewis, the station changed its call letters to the present WLTZ in 1981 but saw no change in its fortunes. The station aired no regular local newscasts at all from 1993 to 2007. SagamoreHill Broadcasting bought the station in 2007 and returned limited local newscasts to the station soon after, opening a full-fledged news department in 2012. This latest attempt at local news ended in 2020, when it began airing newscasts produced by WTVM. Gray Media purchased WLTZ in 2026, creating a virtual triopoly with WTVM and WXTX.

== History ==
=== WYEA-TV: Early years ===
In late 1966 and early 1967, three groups applied for television stations in Columbus, which at the time had two VHF outlets. One—Coastal Television—amended its application to specify channel 54 and received a construction permit, but it was never built. The other two, the Inland Broadcasting Company (a consortium of Georgia and Alabama residents) and Gala Broadcasting Company (led by Charles F. Grisham, owner of WHNT-TV in Huntsville, Alabama), merged their bids on the latter's application in July, opening the door for a construction permit to be issued in mid-August to what became known as the Eagle Broadcasting Company. It was obvious what the likely programming would be for the station. WTVM was a primary ABC affiliate and had first call rights on NBC programs, though CBS affiliate WRBL-TV (channel 3) also aired some NBC programming on a secondary basis.

A building permit was issued in December 1969 for a site on Buena Vista Road, and ground was broken in early May. While it was intended for the station to start in time for the 1970 World Series, and WTVM had already discontinued airing NBC programs with the start of the new season, the new station, under the call letters WYEA-TV, was not completed on time. The transmitter was not finished by that fall due to a strike at RCA, which was fabricating the antenna; as a result, WTVM had to petition to carry the World Series.

WYEA-TV began broadcasting on October 29, 1970. The station's second-floor offices suffered heavy damage in a January 1975 fire; the newsroom took water damage, and unprocessed news film was lost, but the station was back on the air within a day.

The first newscast aired by the station was a 5:30 p.m. newscast, 1st Edition News, chosen specifically to avoid the 6 p.m. broadcasts from WRBL and WTVM and counterprogram their offerings. Over the years, the station focused on counterprogramming the two larger stations and also attempted to lure viewers with personalities that left those stations. In one extreme instance, the same four-person team presenting WYEA's evening newscast in 1976 had presented WTVM's News Hour in 1969.

=== American Family ownership ===
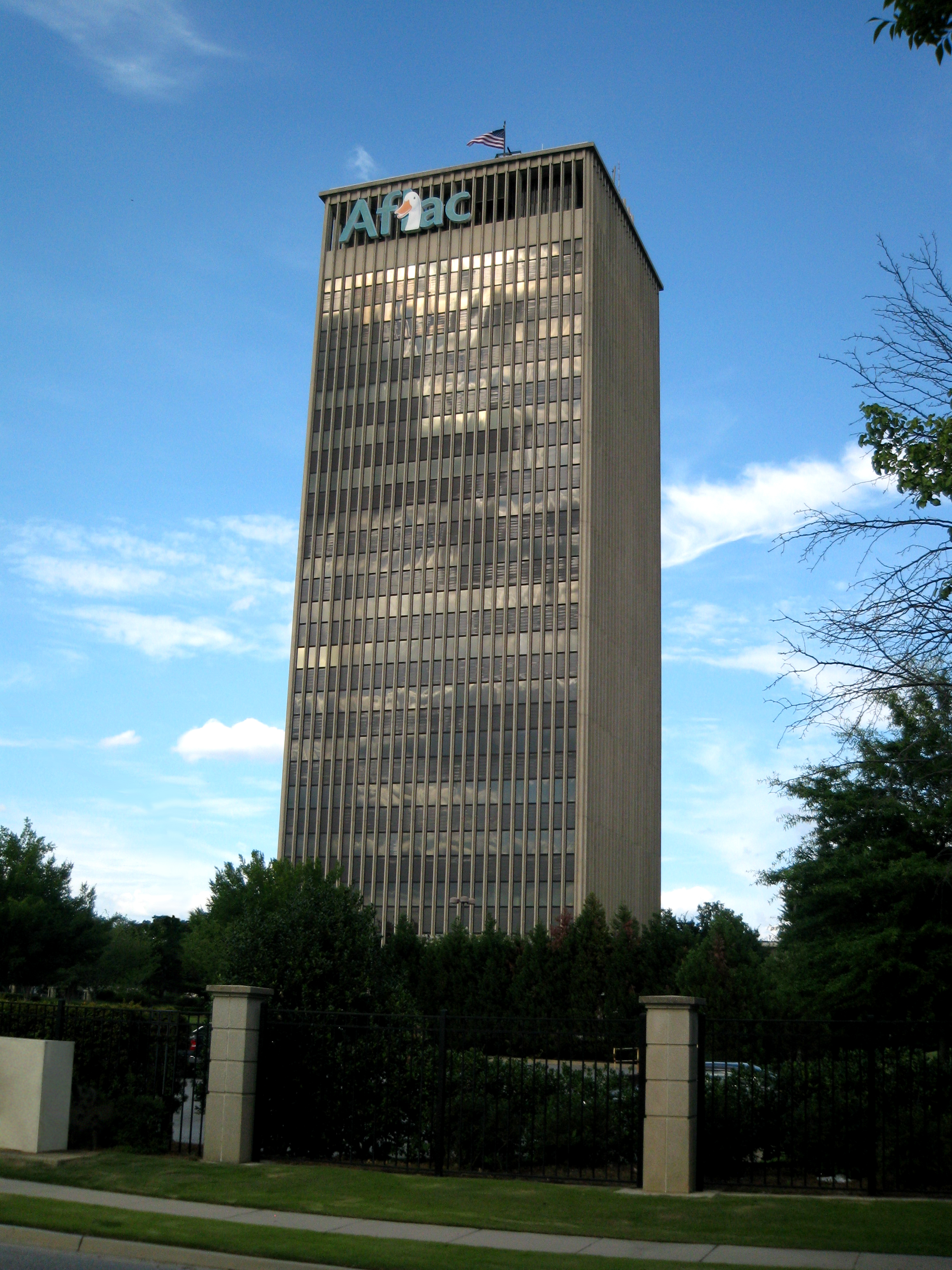
The locally based American Family Corporation, better known today as Aflac (headquarters building pictured), owned WYEA-TV from 1978 to 1981.

The locally based American Family Corporation, the parent of insurer Aflac, announced in July 1977 that it would buy Eagle Broadcasting for $1.5 million and another $1.7 million in assumption of debts, making WYEA-TV its first broadcasting property with intentions to add more. Under the subsidiary of American Eagle Broadcasting, American Family took ownership on March 1, 1978.

John B. Amos, president of American Family, had been looking into a media buy for some time, having analyzed a possible purchase of WRBL-TV and narrowly missing out on purchasing the Mutual Broadcasting System radio network. WYEA-TV, a station that was a distant third place in the market, would prove a challenge as the company's first television property. It had only five full-time news staffers; anchorman Al Fleming and sportscaster Jim Koger only worked part-time. It also only produced one newscast a day and no newscasts at all on weekends. It also faced the prospect of audience erosion from fellow NBC affiliate WSFA in Montgomery, Alabama, which activated a new tower whose footprint penetrated well into channel 38's viewing area. Under American Family, WYEA-TV opposed a proposed television station licensed to Albany, WJFT-TV (channel 19). The Albany station's owners proposed a transmitting facility that would have covered Columbus as well as Albany; it would have been located in Webster County, roughly halfway between the two cities.

Under American Family, the station briefly made a major overhaul of its local news. It adopted the name NewsCenter for its newscasts, and in 1979, it debuted the station's first-ever 11 p.m. newscast. However, many of these changes were later trimmed back for economic reasons after American Family sold the station.

=== Lewis ownership ===
By the start of 1981, American Family owned six stations—WYEA-TV and five outlets in larger markets. Citing its audience share, market size, and signal strength, as well as its status as the least profitable station in the group, American Family opted to sell WYEA to former Savannah mayor Julius Curtis Lewis Jr., whose Lewis Broadcasting owned WJCL-TV in Savannah and WLTX in Columbia, South Carolina. Years later, Leroy Paul, who presided over Aflac's broadcast division, quipped, "We learned we could never become the city's news leader on a UHF station." Aflac would return to the Columbus market in 1989 with the purchase of WTVM.

Lewis took control on July 1, 1981; the station's 11 p.m. newscast was immediately cut, along with several staff dismissals in the news department. The station changed its call sign to WLTZ, beginning to brand itself as "Z-38", on August 31. The station had better ratings for its entertainment programming in the Columbus metro area than it did in the larger designated market area, which included counties where WRBL and WTVM were received but not WLTZ.

Under Lewis, the station briefly had the first Black anchor on Columbus television: future state senator Ed Harbison, who anchored WLTZ's evening newscast from September 1982 to August 1984. The lack of a late newscast or weekend newscasts, plus many resources their competitors had and the frequent confusion of their reporters with those from other stations, slighted the channel 38 news staff: Mick Walsh, the television writer for The Columbus Enquirer, called WLTZ "the Rodney Dangerfield of local news". In one instance, WLTZ passed on the opportunity to send a media member to witness an execution because it would have been too late on a Friday to have a story for any newscast; it was the first time that a media representative had failed to show up for an execution in Georgia since 1976. Ratings remained stubbornly low. In February 1993, four percent of Columbus metro households watched WLTZ's 6 p.m. newscast, a sharp contrast to Star Trek: The Next Generation on WXTX (15 share) and the newscasts on WRBL (18 share) and WTVM (52 share).

On November 15, 1993, station management announced the WLTZ news department would be dissolved on November 24, citing low ratings and lack of "wide market acceptance". The news came as a shock to the seven-member news staff, all but one of whom were laid off. By this time, the station was deep in fourth place; its 6 p.m. newscast attracted only a tenth of the ratings of market leader WTVM and was well behind Star Trek: The Next Generation on WXTX. The station had no regular local newscasts for the next 14 years. However, it did invite one of the staffers it fired, Fleming, to produce short news breaks to air during NBC's coverage of the 1996 Summer Olympics.

Lewis announced it would sell WLTZ in 1994 to Piney Creek Broadcasting, headed by Ruth Allen Ollison, which would contract with Jack Pezold, owner of Fox affiliate WXTX, to provide its programs under a local marketing agreement (LMA). Pezold would also finance the sale for Piney Creek. The proposed transaction led to petitions to deny by WRBL and WTVM. While the sale appeared to be "almost a done deal" by February 1995, when the Federal Communications Commission (FCC) rejected the challenges from the competing local stations, the deal fell through that April after Congress ended a tax certificate program that encouraged the sale of broadcast stations to minorities.

=== SagamoreHill and Gray ownership ===
Lewis kept WLTZ until 2007, when it was sold to SagamoreHill Broadcasting; it was the last television property owned by Lewis. In November 2007, the station brought back weeknight newscasts (seen at 6, 7, and 11 p.m., or 5, 6, and 10 Central) in partnership with the Independent News Network (INN) of Davenport, Iowa. Originally, the early evening shows aired in traditional half-hour formats, while the late newscast ran for 11 minutes. The Iowa-based news presenters read stories prepared by local reporters in Columbus; WLTZ also partnered with the Ledger-Enquirer newspaper for local coverage.

WLTZ converted to digital-only broadcasting February 17, 2009. That same year, the station added The CW to a subchannel after the network discontinued its relationship with Pappas Telecasting, owner of WLGA (channel 66), then the region's CW affiliate. In 2012, the station restored local news production from Columbus.

In September 2020, SagamoreHill entered into an eight-year shared services agreement with Gray Television to provide back-office services including master control, engineering services, and promotional services, as well as newscasts for WLTZ. On November 24, 2020, television industry website FTVLive.com reported that WLTZ had produced its final newscast on November 20 and that many employees were then laid off. WLTZ then began simulcasting newscasts produced by WTVM.

On August 1, 2025, Gray announced it would purchase WLTZ, along with sister stations KJTV-TV and KJTV-CD in Lubbock, Texas, from SagamoreHill. Gray applied for failing station waivers. The sale was approved by the FCC on May 6, 2026, and completed two days later.

== Notable former on-air staff ==
- Mallory Hagan – reporter and co-anchor, 2016–2018

== Technical information and subchannels ==
WLTZ's transmitter is located on NBC 38 Drive off Buena Vista Road on the east side of Columbus. The station's signal is multiplexed:

Subchannels of WLTZ
Subchannel	Res.	Short name	Programming
38.1	720p	WLTZ-DT	NBC
38.2	720p	WLTZ-D2	The CW Plus
38.3	480i	WLTZ-D3	Antenna TV (primary); MyNetworkTV (secondary) (4:3)
38.4	480i	WLTZ-D4	Court TV
