= WBOJ =

- Columbus, Georgia; United States
- Broadcast area: Columbus metropolitan area
- Frequency: 1270 kHz
- Branding: Boomer 102.5

Programming
- Format: Classic hits

Ownership
- Owner: 88.5 The Truth, Inc.
- Operator: PMB Broadcasting, LLC
- Sister stations: WKCN

History
- First air date: 1952 (as WPNX)
- Former call signs: WPNX (1952–1953); WGBA (1953–1965); WHYD (1965–1994); WTMQ (1994–1997); WMLF (1997–2004); WSHE (2004–2015); WZCG (3/2015–7/2015)

Technical information
- Licensing authority: FCC
- Facility ID: 36685
- Class: D
- Power: 5,000 watts day; 237 watts night
- Transmitter coordinates: 32°27′54.5″N 85°1′21.8″W
- Translator: 102.5 W273CW (Columbus)

Links
- Public license information: Public file; LMS
- Webcast: Listen live
- Website: pmbsites.com/wbojam-home/

WBOJ (1270 AM) is a radio station licensed to Columbus, Georgia, serving the Columbus metropolitan area. The station is owned by 88.5 The Truth, Inc., and operated by PMB Broadcasting.

== History ==
The station was first licensed in 1952 as WPNX in Phenix City, Alabama, owned by Community Broadcasting Company. In 1953, Community Broadcasting sold the WPNX license to L. H. Christian and C. A. McClure, owners of WRFC in Athens, Georgia, for $30,000; it then bought WGBA (1460 AM) in Columbus from the Ledger-Enquirer. When the sales were completed on October 26, 1953, Christian and McClure moved the 1270 license to Columbus and took on the WGBA call sign, while Community moved the 1460 license to Phenix City as the new WPNX. This series of deals was prompted by WGBA and WRBL merging their competing applications for a television station on channel 4, with the Ledger-Enquirer also taking a 51% stake in WRBL radio. On September 1, 1965, WGBA's call sign was changed to WHYD, with a full-time country format.

The station was assigned the call letters WTMQ on March 28, 1994. In March 1997, WTMQ was purchased by M&M Partners Inc. and flipped from Spanish-language programming to a Gospel music format. On June 20, 1997, the station changed its call sign to WMLF.

In May 2003, the station changed formats from sports talk "The Sports Monster" to Southern Gospel music. On February 27, 2004. the call letters were changed to WSHE.

On January 15, 2014, WSHE went silent and then returned to the air on July 25, 2014, with a sports format with programming from Fox Sports Radio. The call letters were changed to WZCG on March 2, 2015, and then to WBOJ on July 1, 2015.

On April 26, 2016, WBOJ changed its format from sports to classic country as "Kissin' Country Legends", branded as an offshoot of WKCN, and utilizing a simulcast on 102.5 W273CW.

On August 12, 2016, WBOJ changed its format from classic country to classic hits, branded as "Boomer 102.5", in a format swap with WRLD (95.3 FM).
