= Anne Montgomery (sportscaster) =

American female sportscaster, sports official, author and teacher

Anne B. Montgomery (born 1955) is an American sportscaster, sports official, author and teacher. She was among the first women sportscasters on television, and is reported to be the only woman high school football referee in the state of Arizona.

== Early life and education ==
Anne Butler Montgomery was born in 1955 and grew up in Livingston, New Jersey. She was an ice skater and has a bronze test medal in ice dancing from the United States Figure Skating Association.

Montgomery attended Miami University in Oxford, Ohio, including one year (1975–76) at its John E. Dolibois European Campus in Luxembourg. She graduated with a Bachelor of Science degree in communications from Miami in 1977. She also has a master's degree in education curriculum and a Reading Specialist Credential, both from the University of Phoenix.

== Career ==
=== Sports Official/Television Sportscaster ===
After graduating from college, Montgomery was unable to get a broadcasting job. Using her skating background, she moved to Washington, D.C. and began hockey officiating. She later expanded into other sports, has officiated football, baseball, ice hockey, soccer and basketball games in six states. Montgomery is a high school football referee and crew chief for the Arizona Interscholastic Association., She is reported to be the only female referee in Arizona.

Breaking into a male-dominated field in the 1980s, Montgomery was a sportscaster at WRBL-TV in Columbus, Georgia, WROC-TV in Rochester, New York and KTSP-TV in Phoenix, Arizona. She was one of the first female anchors for the Emmy and ACE award-winning SportsCenter for ESPN in Bristol, Connecticut. She was the on-camera studio host for the NBA’s Phoenix Suns for two years.

=== Writer/Author/Teacher ===
Montgomery has been a freelance and staff reporter, writing feature articles, movie reviews, and pieces on sports and archeological subjects. Her works have appeared in six publications.

In 2005, Montgomery's book The Jerusalem Syndrome, the Wreck of the Sunset Limited, a fictional account of the 1995 sabotage of a passenger train in Hyder, Arizona - a deadly, cold case crime - was awarded honorable mention in genre fiction in the Writer's Digest International Self-Published Book Awards. The book was later published as A Light in the Desert by Sarah Book Publishing. Montgomery's historical novel, The Magician, named an Editors' Top Pick by Musa Publishing, was released in December 2013.That novel was also later published by Sarah Book Publishing. The new title is Nothing But Echoes. Her third novel, The Scent of Rain, which details a young girl's escape from a polygamous cult, was published by Treehouse Publishing in March 2017.

In 2000, Anne Montgomery began teaching journalism at South Mountain High School in Phoenix, Arizona.

== Personal life ==
Montgomery was married to a minor-league baseball umpire; they later divorced and remain friends. In her spare time, Montgomery indulges in her passions: rock collecting, scuba diving, refereeing high school football games, and playing her guitar. She is also a foster mom to three sons.
