= WBFA =

- Fort Mitchell, Alabama; United States
- Broadcast area: Columbus, Georgia; Phenix City, Alabama
- Frequency: 98.3 MHz
- Branding: 98.3 The Beat

Programming
- Format: Mainstream Urban
- Affiliations: Westwood One, Premiere Radio Networks

Ownership
- Owner: J. Christopher Martin Program Director Angela AP Peterson; (RCG Media, LLC)

History
- First air date: 2004
- Former call signs: WAGH (1987–2007)
- Call sign meaning: The Beat

Technical information
- Licensing authority: FCC
- Facility ID: 43093
- Class: A
- ERP: 6,000 watts
- HAAT: 100.0 meters
- Transmitter coordinates: 32°21′48″N 85°03′06″W

Links
- Public license information: Public file; LMS
- Webcast: Listen Live
- Website: 983thebeat.com/

WBFA (98.3 FM, "98.3 The Beat") is a radio station broadcasting an mainstream urban format. Licensed to Fort Mitchell, Alabama, the station is owned by J. Christopher Martin, through licensee RCG Media, LLC, and features programming from Westwood One and Premiere Radio Networks. Its studios are in Columbus, the second largest city in Georgia. The station is east of downtown, and its transmitter is outside Fort Mitchell, Alabama.

== Programming ==
WBFA changed from Contemporary Hit Radio to Urban Contemporary music on September 9, 2004, and has been in its current format since that change. Current personalities and programming includes the Morning Hustle morning show, A.P. "The Mid-Day Diva", Jay King' on afternoon drive, plus DJ Cashflow. Angela AP Peterson has been program director and music director since 2017.

== History ==
In September 2004, WAGH, then known as WBFA, flipped from a contemporary hit radio format branded as "B101" to a mainstream urban format branded as "The Beat". In September 2007, this format, branding, and the WBFA call letters were swapped with sister station WAGH.

The station was assigned the WBFA call letters by the Federal Communications Commission on September 4, 2007.

In July 1998, adult contemporary music formatted WAGH ("Magic 98") was purchased by M&M Partners Inc. for a reported $2 million to become the fifth station in that ownership group's Columbus cluster.

WBFA, along with sister station WSHE, officially joined the Aloha Station Trust on August 4, 2008.

On November 24, 2017, after being in the Aloha Trust for 8 years, WBFA was bought by RCG Media for $1.1 million. The sale was consummated on January 24, 2018.
