= WHTY (AM) =

Radio station in Alabama

- Phenix City, Alabama–Columbus, Georgia; United States
- Broadcast area: Columbus metropolitan area, Georgia
- Frequency: 1460 kHz
- Branding: Columbus' BIN 94.7/1460 AM

Programming
- Format: Black-oriented news
- Affiliations: Black Information Network

Ownership
- Owner: iHeartMedia, Inc.; (iHM Licenses, LLC)
- Sister stations: WAGH; WDAK; WGSY; WSTH-FM; WVRK

History
- First air date: January 14, 1948 (as WSAC)
- Former call signs: WSAC (1947–1949); WGBA (1949–1953); WPNX (1953–1989); WIQN (1989–1991); WPNX (1991–2003); WHAL (2003–2018); WGSY (2018–2020)
- Call sign meaning: carried over from 100.1 FM, formerly branded "Hot"

Technical information
- Licensing authority: FCC
- Facility ID: 32383
- Class: B
- Power: 4,000 watts day; 140 watts night
- Transmitter coordinates: 32°25′58″N 84°57′02″W
- Translator: 94.7 W234BX (Highland Pines)

Links
- Public license information: Public file; LMS
- Webcast: Listen live (via iHeartRadio)
- Website: columbus.binnews.com

WHTY (1460 AM) is a radio station licensed to serve Phenix City, Alabama, and Columbus, Georgia, United States. The station is owned by iHeartMedia, Inc. and licensed to iHM Licenses, LLC. WHTY operates as the Black Information Network affiliate for Columbus. Its studios are in Columbus east of downtown, and its transmitter is southeast of downtown. Its programming is also heard on translator station W234BX (94.7 FM) in the Highland Pines section of Columbus.

== History ==
WHTY is rooted in two stations that signed on from Columbus, Georgia, in the late 1940s. WGBA, owned by the Ledger-Enquirer newspapers' Georgia-Alabama Broadcasting Corp., started broadcasting October 4, 1947, on 620 kHz at 1 kW daytime only. In the beginning, it simulcast programming of WGBA-FM, which began broadcasting in December 1946. Separately, on January 14, 1948, the Chattahoochee Broadcasting Co. launched WSAC as a Mutual affiliate on 1460 kHz at 1 kW full-time. When William K. Jenkins, WSAC's majority owner and also a minority owner of WSAV in Savannah and WLAG in LaGrange, decided to sell to focus on Paramount Pictures' divestment of its theater interests, the Ledger-Enquirer bought the station for $109,000 and merged it with WGBA, operating under WSAC's full-time license and Mutual affiliation but with the WGBA call sign.

In 1953, the Ledger-Enquirer sold the WGBA license to Community Broadcasting Co., owner of WPNX (1270 AM) in Phenix City, Alabama, for $25,000; the sale was necessary so that WGBA and WRBL could merge their competing applications for a television station on channel 4, with the Ledger-Enquirer also taking a 51% stake in WRBL radio. Community Broadcasting moved the 1460 license to Phenix City and changed its call sign to WPNX; the previous WPNX on 1270 was then sold to L. H. Christian and C. A. McClure, relocated to Columbus, and became the new WGBA, a swap completed on October 26, 1953.

WPNX aired a country & western music format throughout the 1960s and 1970s as "1460 Kickin' Country". In the late 1970s, the station flipped to Southern Gospel music. In the 1980s, WPNX tried a variety of formats as new FM stations gained popularity in the region.

In October 1984, Bi-State Broadcasting Company, Inc., reached an agreement to sell this station to JRM Broadcasting, Inc. The deal was approved by the Federal Communications Commission (FCC) on December 7, 1984, and the transaction was consummated on March 6, 1985.

In September 1987, J.T. Milligan acquired positive control of JRM Broadcasting from James R. Martin through the purchase of stock. The transfer of control was approved by the FCC on September 21, 1987, and the transfer was consummated on September 30, 1987.

On February 1, 1989, the station changed callsigns to WIQN to match a shift to talk radio programing. On March 4, 1991, the station returned to its heritage WPNX call letters and a country music format.

JRM Broadcasting was forced to relocate the WPNX studios and radio tower after the Phenix City city council terminated its ground lease in August 1994 as part of renovation plans for Idle Hour Park. Before the move, WPNX was located in the former terminal building of the defunct Phenix City Airport. That building at 1002 Airport Road in Phenix City now houses the Phenix City Art Center. The transmitter site was moved to its current location at the intersection of North Lumpkin Road and US Highway 27 in Columbus, Georgia. Along with the move, the station reduced signal power to 4,000 watts daytime and 140 watts at night but switched to a non-directional signal pattern. Prior to the move, the station had a more powerful, but directional signal using two towers.

Jim Martin and Tommy Milligan reached an agreement in January 1996 to sell JRM Broadcasting to a new company, M&M Partners, Inc., which they would continue to own jointly. The deal was approved by the FCC on February 21, 1996, and the transaction was consummated on February 29, 1996. In 1997, station owner M&M Partners Inc. added three more radio stations to its existing WPNX/WVRK cluster.

Cumulus Broadcasting entered the Columbus market in August 1997 by buying these five stations for $15 million from M&M Partners. The deal was approved by the FCC on October 28, 1997, and the transaction was consummated on January 7, 1998. The new owners flipped the station to a sports talk format including Atlanta Falcons football games and regular programming from ESPN Radio.

In July 2000, Cumulus Media Inc. (Lewis W. Dickey Jr., president) reached an agreement to sell this station to Clear Channel Communications Inc. (L. Lowry Mays, chairman) as part of an 80-station deal for a reported $166 million. After multiple formal objections to this deal, it was ultimately approved by the FCC on February 21, 2002, and the transaction was consummated on April 23, 2002. At the time of the sale, the station aired a Southern Gospel music format.

The station was assigned the WHAL call letters by the FCC on May 2, 2003. From spring 2003 until spring 2006, WHAL aired a black gospel music format branded as "Hallelujah 1460". In early summer 2006, the station switched to Spanish-language programming as "Viva 1460".

On May 15, 2009, WHAL flipped to sports talk as "Fox Sports 1460" airing Fox Sports Radio network programming. Another change, to the 24/7 Comedy network, occurred on October 29, 2012. After the end of the 24/7 Comedy network, WHAL flipped to classic country (branded as "Classic Country 1460") on August 4, 2014. On December 1, 2015, WHAL rebranded as "South 94.7 The Legend" to reflect the launch of translator station W234BX (94.7 FM).

On January 15, 2018, WHAL changed their format from classic country to adult contemporary, branded as "Sunny 94.7"; the format was moved from WGSY (100.1 FM), which moved to an urban contemporary format. The station picked up the WGSY call sign on January 25, 2018. On November 2, 2018, Sunny 94.7 flipped from its regular format to Christmas music for the holiday season.

In 2019, WGSY shifted its format from adult contemporary to hot adult contemporary. On October 1, 2019, WGSY rebranded as "Mix 94.7".

On June 29, 2020, fifteen iHeart stations in markets with large African American populations, including WGSY, began stunting with African American speeches, interspersed with messages such as "Our Voices Will Be Heard" and "Our side of the story is about to be told," with a new format slated to launch on June 30. That day, WGSY, along with the other fourteen stations, became the launch stations for the Black Information Network, an African American-oriented all-news network. Concurrently, the "Sunny" branding and adult contemporary format was restored to 100.1, by then WHTY. On August 3, 2020, WGSY changed its call sign to WHTY.
