= WQSI =

Radio station in Union Springs–Auburn, Alabama

- Union Springs, Alabama; United States
- Broadcast area: Auburn, Alabama Columbus, Georgia
- Frequency: 93.9 MHz
- Branding: FM talk 93.9

Programming
- Format: News/talk
- Affiliations: Fox News Radio; Radio America; Salem Radio Network; Westwood One

Ownership
- Owner: Tiger Communications, Inc.
- Sister stations: WACQ, WAUD, WQNR, WTGZ

History
- First air date: January 7, 1977
- Former call signs: WQSI (1977–1982); WSCA (1982–1985); WSFU-FM (1985–2003); WQSI (2003–2010); WTGZ (2010–2020)
- Former frequencies: 100.9 MHz

Technical information
- Licensing authority: FCC
- Facility ID: 9782
- Class: C3
- ERP: 12,500 watts
- HAAT: 143 meters (469 ft)
- Transmitter coordinates: 32°28′17″N 85°34′28″W

Links
- Public license information: Public file; LMS
- Webcast: Listen Live
- Website: WQSI Online

WQSI (93.9 FM, "FM Talk 93.9") is an American radio station broadcasting a news/talk format. Licensed to Union Springs, Alabama, the station serves the Auburn, Alabama, area. The station is currently owned by Tiger Communications, Inc.

On May 4, 2020, WQSI and its talk format moved to 93.9 FM Union Springs, swapping frequencies with alternative rock-formatted WTGZ.

== Programming ==
Syndicated music programming once included America's Grand Ole Opry Weekend from Westwood One. Auburn didn't really take to the classic country format, and in the summer of 2014 the music gave way to a conservative news/talk format. (Taken from Alabama Broadcast Media Page) Now as a talk station notable programs include Don Imus in the Morning, The Paul Finebaum Show, The Savage Nation with Dr Michael Savage and Coast to Coast AM with George Noory.

== Ownership ==
In November 2005, Tiger Communications Inc. (Thomas Hayley, president) reached an agreement to acquire WBIL and WQSI from H&H Communications LLC (Fred R. Hughey, member) for a reported combined sale price of $350,000. The FCC approved the deal on February 13, 2006, and the transaction was consummated on April 6, 2006.

== Awards and honors ==
As a country music formatted station, WQSI on-air personality Pat Julian was nominated for a Country Music Association Award as "Small Market Broadcast Personality of the Year" in 1983.
