= WQNR =

- Tallassee, Alabama; United States
- Broadcast area: Auburn, Alabama; Columbus, Georgia
- Frequency: 99.9 MHz
- Branding: 99.9 Kate FM

Programming
- Format: Variety hits
- Affiliations: Premiere Networks; United Stations Radio Networks; Westwood One

Ownership
- Owner: Tiger Communications, Inc.
- Sister stations: WACQ, WAUD, WQSI, WTGZ

History
- First air date: 1992
- Former call signs: WACQ-FM (1989–1999)

Technical information
- Licensing authority: FCC
- Facility ID: 68310
- Class: A
- ERP: 2,950 watts
- HAAT: 142 meters
- Transmitter coordinates: 32°26′30″N 85°47′45″W

Links
- Public license information: Public file; LMS
- Webcast: Listen Live
- Website: WQNR Online

WQNR (99.9 FM, "99.9 Kate FM") is a radio station broadcasting a variety hits format. Licensed to Tallassee, Alabama, United States, the station serves the Auburn, Alabama, area. The station is currently owned by Tiger Communications, Inc.

The station was assigned the WQNR call letters by the Federal Communications Commission on July 29, 1999.

The station is an affiliate of the syndicated Pink Floyd program "Floydian Slip."

== Programming ==
The station has been previously known as "99.9 The Rock" with an adult album alternative music format. On April 14, 2008, the station was rebranded as "99.9 Kate FM" with a variety hits format.

== Awards and honors ==
In 2004, 2005, 2006, and 2007 WQNR, as 99.9 'The Rock', was recognized as "College Station of the Year" by New Music Weekly Magazine at the New Music Awards.
