= WSTH-FM =

- Alexander City, Alabama; United States
- Broadcast area: Auburn, Alabama; Columbus, Georgia
- Frequency: 106.1 MHz
- Branding: South 106.1

Programming
- Format: Country
- Affiliations: Premiere Networks

Ownership
- Owner: iHeartMedia, Inc.; (iHM Licenses, LLC)
- Sister stations: WAGH; WDAK; WGSY; WHTY; WVRK

History
- First air date: 1949
- Former call signs: WRFS-FM (1949–1986)
- Call sign meaning: "South"

Technical information
- Licensing authority: FCC
- Facility ID: 60763
- Class: C1
- ERP: 86,000 watts
- HAAT: 319 meters (1,047 ft)
- Transmitter coordinates: 32°45′30″N 85°28′20″W
- Translators: 101.7 W269CT (Columbus, Georgia)

Links
- Public license information: Public file; LMS
- Webcast: Listen live (via iHeartRadio)
- Website: mysouth1061.iheart.com

WSTH-FM (106.1 MHz) is a radio station broadcasting a country music format. Licensed to Alexander City, Alabama, United States, the station is owned by iHeartMedia, Inc. (as iHM Licenses) and features programming from iHeart's subsidiary, Premiere Networks, including the Bobby Bones Show.

The station began in 1949 as WRFS-FM, the sister station to WRFS (1050 AM). In 1986, it became WSTH "South 106". It was then re-branded into a short-lived incarnation of "Kix 106" before becoming "Rooster 106" in 2000. In February 2010, the station assumed a new moniker of "South 106.1".
