= WXTX =

Television station in Columbus, Georgia, United States

- Columbus, Georgia; United States
- Channels: Digital: 24 (UHF); Virtual: 54
- Branding: Fox 54; News Leader 9 on Fox 54

Programming
- Affiliations: 54.1: Fox; for others, see § Subchannels

Ownership
- Owner: Gray Media; (Gray Television Licensee, LLC)
- Sister stations: WTVM, WLTZ

History
- First air date: June 27, 1983
- Former channel numbers: Analog: 54 (UHF, 1983–2009); Digital: 49 (UHF, 2002–2018)
- Former affiliations: Independent (1983–1987); MyNetworkTV (secondary, 2006–2012)

Technical information
- Licensing authority: FCC
- Facility ID: 12472
- ERP: 200 kW
- HAAT: 339 m (1,112 ft)
- Transmitter coordinates: 32°27′41″N 84°52′43″W

Links
- Public license information: Public file; LMS

WXTX (channel 54) is a television station in Columbus, Georgia, United States, affiliated with the Fox network. It is owned by Gray Media alongside ABC affiliate WTVM (channel 9) and NBC/CW+ affiliate WLTZ (channel 38). WXTX and WTVM share studios on Wynnton Road in the Dinglewood section of Columbus; WXTX's transmitter facility is located on the city's east edge.

WXTX began broadcasting as the city of Columbus's first independent station on June 27, 1983. It was put on the air by Media Central, which built smaller-market independent stations in mostly Southern markets, and joined Fox in July 1987. After Media Central filed for bankruptcy protection, local restaurateur Jack Pezold acquired it in 1989. WXTX surpassed WLTZ in total-day viewership under Pezold's ownership and by 1996 was in the top 10 percent of all Fox affiliates in ratings. After ownership stints by Retlaw Broadcasting and Fisher Broadcasting, the station was purchased by Southeastern Media Holdings in 2003. Southeastern, a company backed by the Retirement Systems of Alabama, contracted with then-WTVM owner Raycom Media to handle station operations. The station airs 7 a.m., 7 p.m. and 10 p.m. newscasts from the WTVM newsroom.

== History ==
=== Early years ===
In 1981, two groups applied to the Federal Communications Commission (FCC) for permission to build a new TV station on channel 54 in Columbus, Georgia. Both groups planned an independent station. Beacon Broadcasting was a subsidiary of Quality Media Corporation, an owner of religious radio stations expanding into more secular independent TV operations. Columbus Family Television was owned by Morton Kent, a bank president in Marietta, and his brother Jonathan. A 49% stake in the license was held by Southern Star Media, which divided it among 34 limited partners. Columbus Family Television was awarded the construction permit and contracted with Media Central, a company owned by Morton's father Stephen, to provide equipment. Studios and a transmitter were built at 6525 Buena Vista Road.

The startup of channel 54, bearing the call sign WXTX, was delayed multiple times by technical problems including drainage concerns near the tower as well as a dispute with the first tower crew assigned to the job. Delays prompted station officials to use business cards that asked, "Channel 54, Where Are You?". The official air date was postponed several times, and the station finally went on the air on June 17, 1983. It was the first independent station in Columbus proper and the second in the market after Opelika, Alabama's WSWS-TV (channel 66), which was not at the time carried on cable in Columbus. Media Central's stations spurned affiliation with Fox when the network launched in 1986, but on July 6, 1987, WXTX and three other Media Central stations joined the network.

WXTX joining Fox coincided with problems for Media Central. In July 1987, the company—now with eight stations in its portfolio—filed for bankruptcy reorganization. The problems were not seen to affect channel 54 locally, as WXTX had established itself as a good competitor in the local ratings. During this time, Media Central promoted its purchase of rights to such programs as Family Ties and Cheers but ended up not carrying through with the purchases, even though the programs had been announced on WXTX's lineup. Employee morale was woe with high turnover in management.

=== Pezold ownership ===
In March 1989, Jack Pezold, a local franchisee of McDonald's restaurants, successfully bid to buy WXTX out of Media Central's bankruptcy. Pezold had been a late bidder for the station. The bankruptcy court had already accepted another offer from Timothy Brumlik, but Pezold's bid was higher. Under Pezold, the station briefly revived The Rozell Show, a daytime show that had long been a fixture at WRBL (channel 3) until its cancellation. The Fox network's growth spurred ratings on. By 1991, WXTX had surpassed Columbus's NBC affiliate, WLTZ (channel 38), in total-day audience share, having doubled its viewing within a year. By 1996, it was 13th of 131 Fox affiliates in total-day ratings.

In 1994, it was announced that WLTZ would be sold to Piney Creek Broadcasting, headed by Ruth Allen Ollison, which would contract with Pezold to provide its programs under a local marketing agreement. Pezold would also finance the sale for Piney Creek. The proposed transaction led to petitions to deny by WRBL and WTVM (channel 9). While the sale appeared to be "almost a done deal" by February 1995, when the FCC rejected the challenges from the competing local stations, the deal fell through that April after Congress ended a tax certificate program that encouraged the sale of broadcast stations to minorities.

=== Retlaw and Fisher ownership ===
Citing a raft of unexpected offers, Pezold moved to sell WXTX along with WFXG in Augusta—which Pezold had started up in 1991—in 1996. He first agreed to sell the pair to Galleria Broadcasting Group of Atlanta, which intended to expand the studios and start a news department. Galleria failed to secure financing and could not close on the purchase, and a second sale attempt to Girard Communications of Indianapolis failed to materialize. In 1997, WXTX and WFXG were sold to Retlaw Broadcasting, a company founded by Lillian Disney—the widow of Walt Disney—and her daughter Diane.

Shortly after the sale was announced, Lillian Disney died, and Retlaw set about selling its stations, which aside from the Georgia Fox affiliates were located in the western U.S. The 11-station group was sold to Fisher Broadcasting of Seattle in a $215 million transaction.

Fisher began assessing strategic alternatives for its broadcasting division in 2002 spurred by a downturn in cash and a large debt load. Its first attempt to sell the Georgia stations fell through.

=== Common operation with WTVM ===
Fisher sold WXTX and WFXG for $40 million in 2003 to Southeastern Media Holdings Inc., a subsidiary of newspaper publisher Community Newspaper Holdings, Inc. The deal marked Southeastern's entry into broadcasting. The company was mostly owned by the Retirement Systems of Alabama, as was another broadcaster with a TV station in Columbus: Raycom Media, owner of WTVM (channel 9). Southeastern entered into a local marketing agreement with Raycom to manage the station. By March 2004, WXTX was airing a 10 p.m. newscast from WTVM.

In 2011, Community Newspaper Holdings sold Southeastern Media Holdings and its four stations (including WXTX) to Thomas Henson and his American Spirit Media for $24 million and the assumption of $50 million in debt. Raycom merged with Gray Television in a deal announced in 2018 and finalized in 2019.

As of December 2025, WXTX airs a 10 p.m. newscast (an hour on weeknights, 30 minutes on weekends), a weeknight 7 p.m. newscast, and a weekday 7 a.m. morning news hour for a total of 13 1/2 hours a week of news programming.

Gray Media announced on July 1, 2026, that it would buy American Spirit Media's six stations, including WXTX, for $50 million; the deal was permissible because of the 2025 federal appeals court decision Zimmer Radio of Mid-Missouri v. FCC, which struck down limitations on one company owning two of the top four stations in a market.

== Subchannels ==
WXTX's transmitter is located on the east edge of Columbus. The station's signal is multiplexed:

Subchannels of WXTX
Subchannel	Res.	Short name	Programming
54.1	720p	WXTX	Fox
54.2	480i	MeTV	MeTV
54.3	480i	Dabl	Dabl
54.4	480i	MeTOONS	MeTV Toons
54.5	480i	H&I	Heroes & Icons
54.6	480i	StartTV	Start TV
54.7	480i	Nosey	Nosey

WXTX began broadcasting a digital signal on April 9, 2002, on channel 49. Its signal continued on channel 49 after the 2009 digital television transition and moved to channel 24 in 2018 as a result of the 2016 United States wireless spectrum auction.
