= WAGH =

Radio station in Smiths, Alabama-Columbus, Georgia

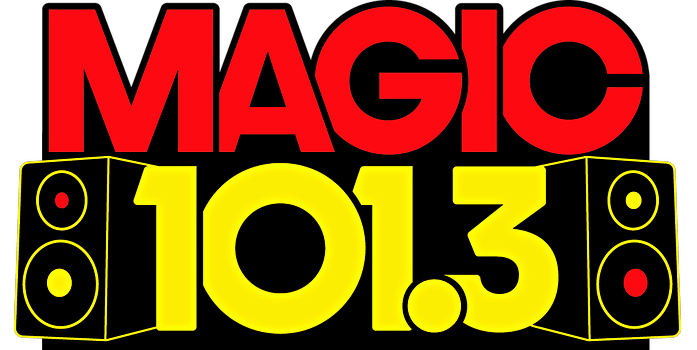
- Smiths, Alabama; United States
- Broadcast area: Columbus, Georgia
- Frequency: 101.3 MHz
- Branding: Magic 101.3

Programming
- Format: Urban adult contemporary
- Affiliations: Premiere Networks

Ownership
- Owner: iHeartMedia, Inc.; (iHM Licenses, LLC)
- Sister stations: WDAK, WGSY, WHTY, WSTH-FM, WVRK

History
- First air date: 1998; 28 years ago
- Former call signs: WBFA (1998–2007)

Technical information
- Licensing authority: FCC
- Facility ID: 60656
- Class: C
- ERP: 18,000 watts
- HAAT: 108 meters (354 ft)
- Transmitter coordinates: 32°25′35″N 85°08′20″W

Links
- Public license information: Public file; LMS
- Webcast: Listen Live
- Website: mymagic101.iheart.com

WAGH (101.3 FM) is a radio station broadcasting an urban adult contemporary music format. WAGH is licensed to serve the community of Smiths, Alabama, United States. The station is currently owned by iHeartMedia, Inc. (with the license held by iHM Licenses, LLC) and features programming from Premiere Networks, including The Steve Harvey Morning Show. Its studios are in Columbus east of downtown, and its transmitter is outside Ladonia, Alabama.

Magic 101.3 logo until October 2020

In September 2004, this station, then known as WBFA, flipped from a contemporary hit radio format branded as "B101" to an urban contemporary/hip-hop music format branded as "The Beat". In September 2007, this format, branding, and the WBFA call letters were swapped with sister station WAGH. The station was assigned the WAGH call letters by the Federal Communications Commission on September 4, 2007.
