= WCUG (Cuthbert, Georgia) =

Cuthbert, Georgia; United States
- Frequency: 850 kHz

Programming
- Format: Defunct (formerly country music)

Ownership
- Owner: Mullis Communications, Inc.

History
- First air date: 1975

Technical information
- Facility ID: 46952
- Class: D
- Power: 500 watts day
- Transmitter coordinates: 31°46′26.00″N 84°50′16.00″W

WCUG (850 AM) was a radio station broadcasting a country music format. Formerly licensed to Cuthbert, Georgia, United States, the station was owned by Mullis Communications, Inc.

Mullis Communications returned WCUG's license to the Federal Communications Commission (FCC) on January 25, 2011, and it was cancelled by the FCC on February 7, 2011.
