= WVRK =

- Columbus, Georgia; United States
- Broadcast area: Columbus, Georgia
- Frequency: 102.9 MHz
- Branding: Rock 103

Programming
- Format: Mainstream rock
- Affiliations: Premiere Networks

Ownership
- Owner: iHeartMedia, Inc.; (iHM Licenses, LLC)
- Sister stations: WAGH; WDAK; WGSY; WHTY; WSTH-FM

History
- First air date: 1949
- Former call signs: WRBL-FM (1949-1977); WRBL (1977–1978); WVOC (1978–1984); WNKS (1984–1989)
- Call sign meaning: "Variety of Rock"

Technical information
- Licensing authority: FCC
- Facility ID: 39457
- Class: C
- ERP: 100,000 watts
- HAAT: 482 meters (1,581 ft)
- Transmitter coordinates: 32°19′16.4″N 84°47′28.2″W

Links
- Public license information: Public file; LMS
- Webcast: Listen live (via iHeartRadio)
- Website: rock103columbus.iheart.com

WVRK (102.9 FM) is a radio station broadcasting a mainstream rock format. Licensed to Columbus, Georgia, United States, the station is owned by iHeartMedia, Inc. The station had previously been owned by M&M Partners Inc. and Cumulus Media before selling to Clear Channel (now iHeartMedia) in 2000. Its studios are in Columbus east of downtown, and its transmitter is in Cusseta, Georgia, south of Fort Benning.

WVRK signed on in 1949 as WRBL-FM simulcasting the programming of WRBL (1420 AM) which had a conventional programming format of CBS Radio Network shows, pop and country music, personality, sports and local news. In 1977, WRBL-TV and radio went their separate ways after the death of longtime station owner Jim Woodruff, Jr. The AM became WRCG while the FM became WVOC.

WVOC, known as V-103, would feature adult contemporary music from 1978 to around 1982 when the station would switch to country music. The station, along with KLFM in Great Falls, Montana, and WCMB in Harrisburg, Pennsylvania, became the first radio stations to pick up Drake-Chenault's Lite Country. The format, incorporating a few pop tunes to tap country fans of the post-World War II generation, would become part of WVOC's country programming.

Then at the end of 1984, WVOC would become WNKS and adopt a contemporary hit radio format known as 102.9 Kiss FM. WNKS would become WVRK in 1989.
