= WMJB-FM =

WMJB
- Valley, Alabama; United States
- Broadcast area: Columbus, Georgia
- Frequency: 95.3 MHz
- Branding: GNN Radio

Programming
- Format: Christian
- Affiliations: GNN Radio

Ownership
- Owner: Augusta Radio Fellowship Institute, Inc.

History
- First air date: 1996
- Former call signs: WUAF (1992–1994); WRLD-FM (1994–2010); WRLD (2010–2023)

Technical information
- Licensing authority: FCC
- Facility ID: 52040
- Class: C3
- ERP: 25,000 watts
- HAAT: 77 meters (253 ft)
- Transmitter coordinates: 32°44′07″N 85°08′55″W

Links
- Public license information: Public file; LMS
- Website: https://gnnradio.org

WMJB (95.3 FM, "GNN Radio") is a radio station broadcasting a Christian radio format. Licensed to Valley, Alabama, United States, the station serves the Columbus, Georgia, area. The station is currently owned by Augusta Radio Fellowship Institute, Inc and carries their GNN Radio programming. Its transmitter is located south of Valley.

== History ==
This station's original construction permit was granted by the Federal Communications Commission on March 4, 1992. The new station was assigned the call sign WUAF on April 23, 1992. The station's call sign was changed to WRLD-FM on February 22, 1994. After several delays, WRLD-FM received its license to cover on April 5, 1996.

In May 1999, Pearce Broadcasting Company, Inc., reached an agreement to sell WRLD-FM to McClure Broadcasting, Inc. The FCC approved the deal on July 22, 1999, and the transaction was consummated on September 21, 1999.

In December 2002, McClure Broadcasting, Inc., (Chuck McClure Jr., president) reached an agreement to sell WRLD-FM to Archway Broadcasting Group (Al Vicente, president/CEO) through their affiliate ABG Georgia Licenses, LLC. This was part of a four-station deal, along with WRCG, WCGQ, and WKCN, for a reported combined sale price of $15 million. The deal was approved by the FCC on February 21, 2003, and the transaction was consummated on April 25, 2003. At the time of the sale, WRLD-FM carried an oldies music format.

On July 31, 2008, local investment group PMB Broadcasting LLC (headed up by Jim Martin) purchased this station along with Columbus-area sister stations WRCG, WCGQ, and WKCN from Archway Broadcasting Group LLC for a reported sale price of $7.2 million.

On September 6, 2010, the station shortened its call sign from WRLD-FM to simply WRLD.

On June 6, 2014, WRLD shifted its format from oldies to classic hits.

On August 12, 2016, WRLD changed its format from classic hits to classic country, branded as "95.3 Kissin' Country" (swapping formats with WBOJ 1270 AM Columbus, GA.

On September 1, 2019, WRLD changed its format from classic country to urban adult contemporary, branded as "95.3 Smooth R&B").

Effective April 10, 2023, PMB Broadcasting sold WRLD to the Augusta Radio Fellowship Institute, Inc. for $1.3 million; PMB Broadcasting moved WRLD's urban AC programming to its WRCG/W221DP. WRLD changed its call sign to WMJB on April 11, 2023.
