= WOKS =

Columbus, Georgia; United States
- Broadcast area: Columbus, Georgia area
- Frequency: 1340 kHz

Programming
- Format: Urban oldies

Ownership
- Owner: Davis Broadcasting, Inc.; (Davis Broadcasting, Inc. of Columbus)
- Sister stations: WEAM-FM, WFXE, WIOL, WIOL-FM, WKZJ

Technical information
- Licensing authority: FCC
- Facility ID: 15846
- Class: C
- Power: 1,000 watts unlimited
- Transmitter coordinates: 32°27′7.00″N 84°58′25.00″W
- Translator: 94.1 W231AO (Columbus)

Links
- Public license information: Public file; LMS
- Website: woks1340.com

WOKS (1340 AM) is a radio station broadcasting an urban oldies format. Licensed to serve Columbus, Georgia, United States, the station serves the immediate area around Columbus and suburban Phenix City, Alabama. The station is currently owned by Davis Broadcasting, Inc. of Columbus. Its radio studios are co-located with four other sister stations on Wynnton Road in Columbus east of downtown, and its transmitter is located in Columbus southeast of downtown.

In late February 2016, Davis' W243CE FM 96.5, located all the way on the far northeast edge of metro Atlanta, was given a construction permit to move to Columbus. The broadcast translator will air WOKS on 97.5 with 250 watts from a height of 53 meters (174 ft). Ordinarily prohibited, the long-distance move is allowed under the FCC's "AM revitalization" program, which allows AM stations (but not other low-power community stations like LPFM) to take existing FM translators and the service they provide away from their current areas and use them to duplicate their own service in the same area the main station already serves, without having to overlap the translator's previous service contour.

Logo before translator sign on
