= WAUD =

- Auburn, Alabama; United States
- Broadcast area: Lee County, Alabama Muscogee County, Georgia
- Frequency: 1230 kHz
- Branding: AM 1230 WAUD

Programming
- Format: Sports
- Affiliations: SportsMap; United Stations Radio Networks; Atlanta Braves Radio Network

Ownership
- Owner: Tiger Communications, Inc.
- Sister stations: WACQ, WQNR, WQSI, WTGZ

History
- First air date: 1947
- Call sign meaning: Auburn University

Technical information
- Licensing authority: FCC
- Facility ID: 3204
- Class: C
- Power: 1,000 watts
- Transmitter coordinates: 32°37′47″N 85°28′08″W

Links
- Public license information: Public file; LMS
- Website: WAUD Online

WAUD (1230 AM) is a radio station broadcasting a sports format. Licensed to Auburn, Alabama, United States, the station serves the Lee County, Alabama, area. The station is currently owned by Tiger Communications. The station's official slogan is "The Voice of Auburn," and it has also been nicknamed "The Thousand-Watt Blowtorch" by past on-air personalities.

== History ==
WAUD is the oldest radio station in Auburn, Alabama, going on the air in 1947.

The station is currently an affiliate of Westwood One Sports, The Paul Finebaum Radio Network, and the radio home of Bob Sanders for 53 years. Its format is a mix of nostalgic music with special local programming in the morning, news, talk, and sports. WAUD is the home of Auburn High School athletic broadcasts, including football, basketball, and baseball.

== Programming ==
Notable weekday programming includes Bob Sanders on mornings. Sanders has been affiliated with WAUD for over 53 years. Other local programming includes "Sports X with Bill Bailey and Sharpie" weeknights and Auburn First Baptist church services on Sunday mornings. Sunday mornings also include a jazz, big band, and nostalgia music block.

Syndicated programming includes The Dan Patrick Show, Paul Finebaum, Atlanta Braves, and CBS Sports Radio.

== Sports & news ==
WAUD provides CBS Radio Network updates at the top of every hour, except during CBS Sports Radio programming. The Alabama Radio Network provides WAUD with state news and sports updates throughout the day. Local news and weather are read live throughout the broadcast day during local programming hours. WAUD carries the entire CBS World News Roundup, America's longest tenured network newscast on either radio or TV, each morning at 7am CST.

The region's first call-in sports program, "SportsCall", originated on WAUD before moving to sister station WQSI 93.9 FM in 2007.

In July 2007, WAUD became the Auburn affiliate of The Paul Finebaum Radio Network.

WAUD currently airs "Jay Doug In The Morning" with Jay Douglas from 6amCT to 8amCT.

The station also airs Atlanta Braves baseball games.
