= WFXE =

Columbus, Georgia; United States
- Broadcast area: Columbus GA area
- Frequency: 104.9 MHz
- Branding: Foxie 105

Programming
- Format: Mainstream urban
- Affiliations: Premiere Networks

Ownership
- Owner: Davis Broadcasting, Inc.; (Davis Broadcasting, Inc. of Columbus)
- Sister stations: WEAM-FM, WIOL, WIOL-FM, WKZJ, WOKS

History
- Former call signs: WFXE-FM (1978-?)
- Call sign meaning: W FoXiE

Technical information
- Licensing authority: FCC
- Facility ID: 15847
- Class: A
- ERP: 2,300 watts
- HAAT: 164.0 meters
- Transmitter coordinates: 32°27′37.00″N 85°0′30.00″W

Links
- Public license information: Public file; LMS
- Webcast: Listen Live
- Website: foxie105fm.com

WFXE (104.9 FM) is a radio station broadcasting a mainstream urban format. Licensed to Columbus, Georgia, United States, the station serves the Columbus GA area. The station is currently owned by Davis Broadcasting, Inc. of Columbus. Its studios are co-located with four other sister stations on Wynnton Road in Columbus east of downtown, and its transmitter is located in Phenix City, Alabama.

== History ==
The station was assigned the call letters WFXE-FM on December 1, 1978. Prior to that the station was known as WWRH or “RH105” as the jingles implied and had an adult contemporary type format. On March 7, 1980, the station changed its call sign to the current WFXE.
