= WIOL-FM =

- Waverly Hall, Georgia; United States
- Broadcast area: Columbus, Georgia
- Frequency: 95.7 MHz
- Branding: 95.7 ESPN

Programming
- Format: Sports
- Affiliations: ESPN Radio

Ownership
- Owner: Davis Broadcasting, Inc.; (Davis Broadcasting, Inc. of Columbus)
- Sister stations: WEAM-FM, WFXE, WIOL, WKZJ, WOKS

History
- First air date: 1994 (as WKZJ)
- Former call signs: WKZJ (1993–2005)

Technical information
- Licensing authority: FCC
- Facility ID: 50534
- Class: A
- ERP: 6,000 watts
- HAAT: 70 meters (230 ft)
- Transmitter coordinates: 32°41′54.00″N 84°44′9.00″W

Links
- Public license information: Public file; LMS
- Webcast: Listen Live
- Website: 957espn.com

WIOL-FM (95.7 FM, "95.7 ESPN") is a radio station broadcasting a sports format. Licensed to Waverly Hall, Georgia, United States, the station serves the Columbus, Georgia, area. The station is owned by Davis Broadcasting of Columbus, Inc. and features programming from ESPN Radio. Its studios are co-located with four other sister stations on Wynnton Road in Columbus east of downtown, and its transmitter is located in Waverly Hall.

== History ==
The station was assigned the call letters WKZJ on 1993-09-15. On 30 March 2005, the station changed its call sign to the current WIOL-FM.

WIOL changed format from Classic Hits to Hot AC in late 2007, and changed the station moniker from Classic Hits 95-7 The River to the New Mix 95-7. On October 16, 2009, WIOL changed format to sports talk and carries the simulcast of WIOL 1580 AM.

== Previous Logos ==
Mix 95.7 Previous Logo

The Zone Previous logo
