= Ruth Allen Ollison =

American journalist

- Born: Texas
- Education: Southwestern Baptist Theological Seminary (M.A.) & Wesley Theological Seminary (PhD)
- Occupation: Broadcast journalist
- Years active: Over 20 years
- Employer(s): NBC, KDAF, WTTG-TV
- Known for: Broadcast journalism
- Awards: NABJ Hall of Fame Honoree

Ruth Allen Ollison, an African-American journalist based in Houston, Texas, who became the first African-American female news director in a top 10 market for her work at KDAF and spent over 20 years in broadcast journalism in various positions.

== Personal ==
Ruth Allen Ollison was born in rural Texas where she worked as a waitress before her journalism career. Ollison has a husband named Quincy and a son named Jacob. She pursued graduate degrees in divinity from Southwestern Baptist Theological Seminary (M.A.) and ministry from Wesley Theological Seminary (PhD).

== Career ==
As a journalist, Ollison worked in various news departments in Texas and Washington, D.C. She worked as the assistant news director at WTTG-TV in Washington DC. Ollison also worked in various Texas news organizations in San Antonio, Houston, and Dallas. She started the NBC affiliate in Tyler, Texas. She also ran the KDAF and KXAS channels in Dallas.

In 1989 Ollison began an eight-month campaign for the presidency of the National Association of Black Journalists. Ollison reportedly received nearly $10,000 from her employer at WTTG-TV for the campaign. Ollison ended up losing the 1989 election. Ollison was the regional director of the National Association of Black Journalists for four years.

After her career in broadcasting, she converted a crack house in inner city Houston into the Beulah Land Community Church. Ollison also served as an adjunct professor at Houston Baptist University, Houston Graduate School of Theology, and B.H. Carroll Theological Institute. In addition, Ollison is a government contractor through her work with Ollison/Elsberg. She is a coach for broadcast personalities and a specialist in helping failing news departments. Ollison is the founder and spiritual leader of the Beulah Land Community Church.

== Notable works of journalism ==
Ollison is well known for starting the news department at an NBC affiliate in Tyler, Texas. Ollison is also helped enhance various failing news departments in Texas and Washington D.C. Ollison has headed Emmy Award winning news departments in Texas and Washington D.C. and has a reputation as a turnaround specialist. Ollison's work has inspired many women business leaders like Patricia Vice. Ollison work can be seen on Women Who Lead show from HCCTV.

== Impact ==
In 1985, Ollison became the first African-American woman to become a News Director in a top ten marker due to her work at KDAF in Dallas, Texas.

Ollison worked for 20 years in broadcast communication and helped to influence many struggling new departments throughout her career. Ollison went on to become news director at KETK in Tyler, Texas and assistant news director for Fox Channel 5 in Washington D.C. Ollison's worked as a turn-around specialist, someone who works with failing news departments, and through her work she helped improve many news departments over her career. Ollison is a big proponent for diversity in the newsroom through actively seeking out African-American news casters. Ollison sought to improve conditions in inner-city Houston by starting a ministry.

== Reactions ==
According to the National Association of Black Journalists Ollison "...has shown renowned strengths in news reporting, anchoring, and management." The Atlanta Daily World praised Ollison for her work as a news executive in enhancing various news networks. Ollison has also been praised for her contributions to the Beulah Land Community Church.

== Awards ==
Ollison's work in broadcast journalism earned her a spot in the National Association of Black Journalist's Hall of Fame.

- NABJ Hall of Fame (2012)

== See also ==
- National Association of Black Journalists Hall of Fame
