= WEAM-FM =

- Buena Vista, Georgia; United States
- Broadcast area: Columbus, Georgia
- Frequency: 100.7 MHz
- Branding: Praise 100.7

Programming
- Format: Gospel

Ownership
- Owner: Davis Broadcasting, Inc.; (Davis Broadcasting, Inc. of Columbus)
- Sister stations: WFXE, WIOL, WIOL-FM, WKZJ, WOKS

History
- First air date: April 28, 2003
- Former call signs: WMRZ

Technical information
- Licensing authority: FCC
- Facility ID: 89045
- Class: A
- ERP: 2,600 watts
- HAAT: 153 meters (502 feet)
- Transmitter coordinates: 32°20′33″N 84°39′18″W

Links
- Public license information: Public file; LMS
- Website: www.praise1007.com

WEAM-FM (100.7 FM) is a Christian radio station licensed to serve Buena Vista, Georgia, United States. The station is currently owned by Davis Broadcasting. It airs a Gospel music format. Its studios are co-located with four other sister stations on Wynnton Road in Columbus east of downtown, and its transmitter is located in Cusetta, Georgia.

Former logo

The station was assigned the WEAM-FM call letters by the Federal Communications Commission on April 28, 2003.
