= WACQ =

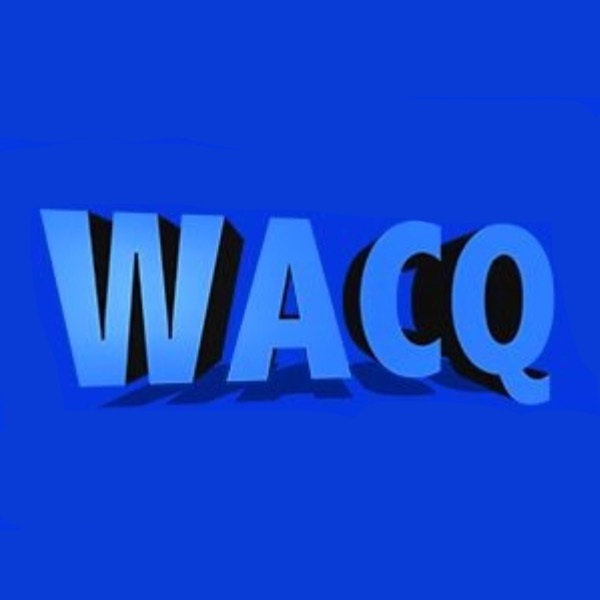
- Tuskegee, Alabama; United States
- Broadcast area: Auburn, Alabama; Columbus, Georgia
- Frequency: 580 kHz
- Branding: Classic Hits 580 WACQ and FM 98.5

Programming
- Format: Classic hits
- Affiliations: ABC Radio

Ownership
- Owner: Tiger Communications, Inc.
- Operator: Fred Randall Hughey
- Sister stations: WAUD, WQNR, WQSI, WTGZ

History
- First air date: 1952
- Former call signs: WTUS (1952–1959); WABT (1959–1973); WBIL (1973–2012)

Technical information
- Licensing authority: FCC
- Facility ID: 1018
- Class: D
- Power: 500 watts day; 139 watts night
- Transmitter coordinates: 32°22′36″N 85°39′28″W
- Translator: 98.5 W253CZ (Tallassee)

Links
- Public license information: Public file; LMS
- Webcast: Listen Live
- Website: wacqradio.com

WACQ (580 AM) is an American radio station licensed to serve the community of Tuskegee, Alabama. The station's broadcast license is held by Tiger Communications, Inc. and operated by Fred Randall Hughey.

== Programming ==
Since June 28, 2012, the station has broadcast an oldies music format to the Montgomery, Alabama, area. The music mix, described as the "greatest hits of all time", is hosted by live, local personalities including Fred Randall Hughey, Brother Rick Dorley, Lamar Godwin, Fr. Mateusz Rudzik, Michael Bird, and Scott Adcock. This programming traces its origins to the June 1979 sign-on of then-WACQ (1130 AM, now WALQ) in Tallassee, Alabama.

WACQ provides coverage to the Reeltown High School athletic teams, a commitment that began when WACQ signed on in 1979. The first song ever played on WACQ in 1979 was "Let Your Love Flow," by The Bellamy Brothers. The first record was played by owner and general manager Fred Randall Hughey.

Today, the Listen Live application on the website, wacqradio.com, as well as the TuneIn app available on smartphones and other devices, give WACQ an audience far beyond the Tallassee area it calls home.

Weekday programming includes "Way of the Cross" with Brother Rick Dorley; "What's Going On?" with Rick Dorley and station owner Fred Randall Hughey; and local news, weather, and sports at 6:00, 7:00, 8:00, 9:00, and 12:00 each day. Weekend programming consists of "The Saturday Morning Show" with Michael Bird and Scott Adcock; Reeltown High School football replays; Troy University Trojans football; and, on Sundays, gospel music and church services from St. Vincent de Paul Catholic Church, First Baptist Church (Reeltown), and First Baptist Church of Tallassee.

Before this change, WACQ broadcast a Gospel music format featuring programming from Citadel Media and branded as "Rejoice 580".

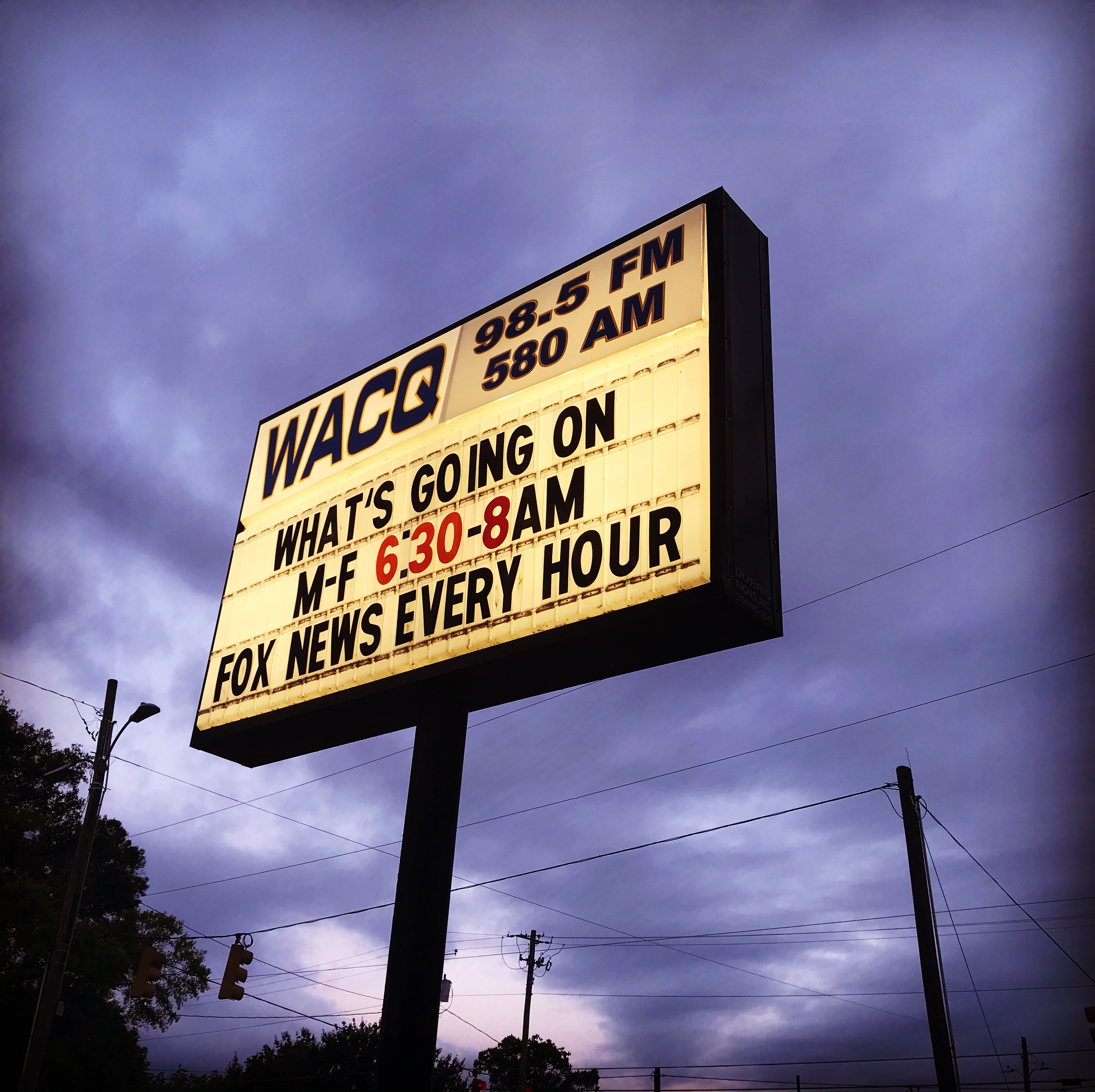
Outside of WACQ Studios in Downtown Tallassee

== History ==
This station, then known as WABT, received its license to cover from the U.S. Federal Communications Commission on September 3, 1952.

In November 2005, Tiger Communications Inc. (Thomas Hayley, president) reached an agreement to acquire the station, by then known as WBIL, and WQSI from H&H Communications LLC (Fred Randall Hughey, member) for a reported combined sale price of $350,000. The FCC approved the deal on February 13, 2006, and the transaction was completed on April 6, 2006. In retaining partial ownership in WBIL and rights to the WACQ call sign, Fred Randall Hughey and his wife Debra began programming AM 580 effective June 28, 2012.

On July 27, 2012, the station changed its call sign from WBIL to WACQ.

== Early history ==
In 1977, Hughey Broadcasting Company, Inc., applied to the FCC for a construction permit for a new broadcast radio station. The FCC granted this permit on February 8, 1979. This new station would broadcast with 1,000 watts of power on a frequency of 1130 kilohertz, but only during daylight hours to protect KWKH in Shreveport, Louisiana, CKWX in Vancouver, British Columbia, and WBBR in New York City from skywave interference. The station was assigned call sign "WACQ". After construction and testing were completed, the station was granted its broadcast license on August 6, 1979.

In August 2006, Hughey Communications applied to the FCC to increase this class D station's daytime-only power from 1,000 to 25,000 watts. The FCC granted a construction permit for this change on August 21, 2007.

WACQ began broadcasting as 580 WACQ, replacing WBIL's signal, in June 2012. From 2006 until 2019, the translator W266BJ broadcast WACQ's programming on FM 101.1. On February 14, 2019, WACQ moved to W253CZ and broadcasts on 98.5 FM.

== Translators ==
WACQ uses a broadcast translator to expand and enhance its coverage area, adding an FM signal to its existing AM broadcast.

Broadcast translator for WACQ
Call sign	Frequency	City of license	FID	ERP (W)	Class	FCC info
W253CZ	98.5 FM	Tallassee, Alabama	201572	250	D	LMS
