= WKZJ =

- Eufaula, Alabama; United States
- Broadcast area: Columbus, Georgia
- Frequency: 92.7 MHz
- Branding: K92.7

Programming
- Format: Urban adult contemporary
- Affiliations: Compass Media Networks; United Stations Radio Networks

Ownership
- Owner: Davis Broadcasting, Inc.; (Davis Broadcasting, Inc. of Columbus)
- Sister stations: WEAM-FM, WFXE, WIOL, WIOL-FM, WOKS

History
- First air date: 1971
- Former call signs: WULA-FM (1971–1981); WKQK (1981–1982); WKQK-FM (1982–1985); WULA-FM (1985–1999); WIOL (1999–2005)

Technical information
- Licensing authority: FCC
- Facility ID: 36307
- Class: C2
- ERP: 39,000 watts
- HAAT: 168 meters (551 ft)
- Transmitter coordinates: 32°07′58″N 85°04′13″W

Links
- Public license information: Public file; LMS
- Webcast: Listen Live
- Website: k927.com

WKZJ (92.7 FM, "K92.7") is a radio station licensed to serve Eufaula, Alabama, United States. The station is owned by Davis Broadcasting, Inc. Its studios are co-located with four other sister stations on Wynnton Road in Columbus, Georgia east of downtown, and its transmitter is located north of Eufaula.

WLZJ broadcasts an urban adult contemporary music format for the Columbus, Georgia, area. This includes programming from Compass Media Networks.

== History ==
=== The beginning ===
This station signed on in 1971, broadcasting with 3,000 watts of effective radiated power at 92.7 MHz as WULA-FM, an FM companion to AM sister station WULA, under the ownership of the Vogel-Milligan Corporation. The FM station primarily rebroadcast the programming of the AM station. On June 1, 1978, both WULA and WULA-FM were sold to WULA, Inc. As the station was beginning independent programming, WULA-FM's owners had the FCC change the call letters to WLAZ in 1978 and then to WKQK on April 6, 1981.

=== A new era ===
In July 1981, WULA, Inc., agreed to sell this station to McGowan Broadcasting, Inc. The deal was approved by the FCC on August 17, 1981. The call letters were changed to WKQK-FM on March 23, 1982, to accommodate a new AM sister station taking on the WKQK callsign.

In April 1985, McGowan Broadcasting, Inc., signed an agreement to sell this station to Lake Eufala Broadcasting, Inc. The deal was approved by the FCC on June 27, 1985, and the transaction was consummated on August 29, 1985. The new owners applied for new call letters and they were changed back to the heritage WULA-FM on September 13, 1985.

In August 1995, Lake Eufala Broadcasting, Inc., contracted to sell this station to McGowan Media, LLC. The deal was approved by the FCC on October 23, 1995, and the transaction was consummated on March 19, 1996. The original AM/FM combo was finally broken up when McGowan Media sold AM station WULA to Mark Hellinger in late 1996.

In March 1997, McGowan Media, LLC, made a deal to sell this station to Woodfin Group subsidiary Hatchee Creek Communications, Inc. The deal was approved by the FCC on April 17, 1997, and the transaction was consummated on June 5, 1997. Owner Ken Woodfin increased the station's signal power, moved it into the Columbus, Georgia, market with a new classic rock format, and changed the branding to "The River". The station applied for new call letters to match their new branding and they were changed to WIOL on February 26, 1999.

=== The present ===
In mid-April 2004, Hatchee Creek Communications, Inc., reached an agreement to sell this station to Davis Broadcasting, Inc. The reported sale price for the station was $2.7 million. The deal was approved by the FCC on June 10, 2004, and the transaction was consummated on July 20, 2004. The callsign was changed to WKZJ on March 30, 2005, after a swap with a new sister station which took the WIOL callsign. In December 2007, Davis Broadcasting, Inc., applied to the FCC to transfer the license for this station to subsidiary Davis Broadcasting, Inc. of Columbus. The transfer was approved by the FCC on December 20, 2007, and the transaction was consummated on March 3, 2008.
