= WLTC =

Urban adult contemporary radio station in Georgia, U.S.

Coordinates: 32.458°N 84.886°W

- Cusseta, Georgia; United States
- Broadcast area: Columbus, Georgia metropolitan area
- Frequency: 103.7 MHz (HD Radio)
- Branding: 103.7 Smooth FM

Programming
- Format: Urban adult contemporary
- Subchannels: HD2: Sportsvisions 92.1 (Sports); HD3: 107.7 The Truth (Contemporary Christian)
- Affiliations: Premiere Networks

Ownership
- Owner: PMB Broadcasting, LLC
- Sister stations: WKCN, WCGQ, WRCG

History
- First air date: 2008
- Former call signs: WBOJ (2007–2009)
- Call sign meaning: "Lite Columbus" (previous format)

Technical information
- Licensing authority: FCC
- Facility ID: 60372
- Class: C3
- ERP: 8,800 watts
- HAAT: 227 meters
- Translators: HD2: 92.1 W221DP (Columbus); HD3: 107.7 W299AX (Columbus)

Links
- Public license information: Public file; LMS
- Webcast: Listen Live; Listen Live (HD2); Listen Live (HD3)
- Website: pmbsites.com/wltcfm-home WLTC-HD2 Online (HD2) thetruthlife.com (HD3)

WLTC (103.7 FM) is a commercial radio station that is licensed in Cusseta, Georgia and serves the city of Columbus, Georgia and its metro area. The station is owned by PMP Broadcasting and airs an urban adult contemporary format, branding as "103.7 Smooth FM".

The station broadcasts with a power of 8,800 watts of Effective radiated power (ERP). This makes it a class C3 station. Its transmitter is located off Buena Vista Road.

== History ==
The station first signed on June 3, 2008, according to their public file. Their original call sign was WBOJ, which they used until 2009.

Each year in early November, WLTC flips to an all-Christmas music format. In 2019, the station was the first station (not counting those stunting) to flip to Christmas music for the season, doing so at roughly the same time as 2018's first-in-the-nation flip, WTRV in Grand Rapids, Michigan.

In September 2025, WLTC changed their format from adult contemporary to urban adult contemporary, branded as "103.7 Smooth FM".

== HD Radio ==
On January 15, 2025, WLTC's HD2 subchannel changed their format from urban adult contemporary to sports, branded as "Sports-visions 92.1".
