= WGSY =

- Phenix City, Alabama; United States
- Broadcast area: Columbus, Georgia
- Frequency: 100.1 MHz
- Branding: Sunny 100

Programming
- Format: Adult contemporary

Ownership
- Owner: iHeartMedia, Inc.; (iHM Licenses, LLC)
- Sister stations: WAGH; WDAK; WHTY; WSTH-FM; WVRK

History
- First air date: 1971 (as WXLE)
- Former call signs: WXLE (1970–1974); WEIZ (1974–1985); WEIZ-FM (1985–1987); WGSY (1987–2018); WHTY (2018–2020)
- Call sign meaning: "Georgia Sunny"

Technical information
- Licensing authority: FCC
- Facility ID: 66668
- Class: A
- ERP: 6,000 watts
- HAAT: 100 meters (330 ft)
- Transmitter coordinates: 32°30′42.5″N 85°0′40.7″W

Links
- Public license information: Public file; LMS
- Webcast: Listen live (via iHeartRadio)
- Website: sunny100.iheart.com

WGSY (100.1 FM) is a radio station licensed to serve Phenix City, Alabama, United States. The station is owned by iHeartMedia, Inc. and licensed to iHM Licenses, LLC. Its studios are in Columbus, Georgia, east of downtown, and its transmitter is in Phenix City. WGSY broadcasts an adult contemporary music format to the Columbus area. The station departs from its usual format and broadcasts Christmas music during the holiday season.

The station was first assigned the WGSY call letters by the Federal Communications Commission on January 1, 1987. M&M Partners Inc. purchased this station in July 1996 for approximately $2 million.

Logo as "Hot 100"

On January 18, 2018 (after stunting with Christmas music for three days as "Santa 100"), WGSY launched an urban contemporary format, branded as "Hot 100". The station changed its call sign to WHTY on January 25, 2018.

On June 29, 2020, WHTY changed formats from urban contemporary back to adult contemporary, branded as "Sunny 100.1". On August 3, 2020, WHTY's call sign changed back to WGSY.
