= WTGZ =

Radio station in Tuskegee, Alabama, United States

- Tuskegee, Alabama; United States
- Broadcast area: Auburn-Opelika, Alabama
- Frequency: 95.9 MHz
- Branding: The Tiger

Programming
- Format: Alternative rock
- Affiliations: United Stations Radio Networks

Ownership
- Owner: Tiger Communications
- Sister stations: WACQ, WAUD, WQNR, WQSI

History
- First air date: July 12, 1975 (as WVNS)
- Former call signs: WVNS (1975–1978); WBIL-FM (1978–1996); WTGZ (1996–2010); WQSI (2010–2020)
- Call sign meaning: "Tigers"

Technical information
- Licensing authority: FCC
- Facility ID: 48682
- Class: A
- ERP: 4,300 watts
- HAAT: 115 meters (377 ft)
- Transmitter coordinates: 32°19′4″N 85°40′16″W

Links
- Public license information: Public file; LMS
- Webcast: Listen Live
- Website: thetiger.fm

WTGZ (95.9 FM, "The Tiger") is a commercial radio station in Tuskegee, Alabama, broadcasting to the Auburn, Alabama, area. Until 2007 the station also broadcast to the Montgomery, Alabama, area on 104.9 FM. The Tiger is the area's only modern rock station and is popular with Auburn University students.

On May 4, 2020, WTGZ and its alternative rock format moved to 95.9 FM Tuskegee, swapping frequencies with talk-formatted WQSI.

== Programming ==
WTGZ airs an alternative rock music format branded as "The Tiger." Notable former on-air personalities include Marti Jackson, Ripper Price, Matt Stone, Sharpie, Johnny Wilkes, and Bill Bailey.

Alternative rock from the 1990s and 2000s is the dominant style of music on the Tiger. Hard Drive airs active rock and heavy metal. These genres of music compose a small portion of the station's regular playlist as well.

WTGZ simulcasts Auburn High School Tigers football games on FM along with WAUD.

WTGZ airs a regional sports call-in show titled SportsCall.

Beginning in 2025, WTGZ also began airing Atlanta Falcons football games.
