= WKCN =

- Fort Benning, Georgia; United States
- Broadcast area: Columbus, Georgia
- Frequency: 99.3 MHz (HD Radio)
- Branding: Kissin' 99.3

Programming
- Format: Country
- Subchannels: HD2: 106.9 Rocks (Active rock); HD3: Hip Hop 106.5 (Classic hip hop); HD4: Radio by Grace (Christian)

Ownership
- Owner: PMB Broadcasting
- Sister stations: WCGQ, WRCG, WLTC

History
- First air date: 1992

Technical information
- Licensing authority: FCC
- Facility ID: 54670
- Class: C2
- ERP: 29,000 watts
- HAAT: 166.9 meters (548 ft)
- Transmitter coordinates: 32°15′24″N 85°00′08″W
- Translators: HD2: 106.9 W295AY (Crystal Valley); HD3: 106.5 W293BV (Columbus); HD4: 99.7 W259CA (Cuthbert)

Links
- Public license information: Public file; LMS
- Webcast: Listen Live; Listen Live (HD2); Listen Live (HD3); Listen Live (HD4)
- Website: kissin993.com 1069rocks.com (HD2) hiphop1065.com (HD3) radiobygrace.com (HD4)

WKCN (99.3 FM), known as "Kissin 99.3", is a radio station licensed to Fort Benning, Georgia and serving the greater Columbus, Georgia, area. Its studios are co-located with four other sister stations on Wynnton Road in Columbus east of downtown, and its transmitter is located near Phenix City, Alabama.

== Programming ==
Kissin 99.3 began broadcasting country music in 1992, and remains a country music radio station today. Current on-air personalities include Bear O'Brian (Wade Collier), Morgan in the Midday, Brian Thomas in the Afternoon, and Dave Arwood at Night, Monday through Friday. WKCN-FM also carries American Country Countdown with Kix Brooks on Sunday nights.

== Ownership ==
In December 2002, McClure Broadcasting, Inc., (Chuck McClure Jr., president) reached an agreement to sell this station to Archway Broadcasting Group (Al Vicente, president/CEO). This was part of a four-station deal, along with WRLD-FM, WRCG, and WCGQ, for a reported combined sale price of $15 million. At the time of the sale, WKCN carried a country music format.

Logo under former slogan

On July 31, 2008, local investment group PMB Broadcasting LLC (headed up by Jim Martin) purchased this station along with Columbus-area sister stations WRCG-AM, WRLD-FM and WCGQ-FM from Archway Broadcasting Group LLC for a reported sale price of $7.2 million. At the time of the sale, the station carried and continues to carry a country music format. PMB Broadcasting LLC has since added WLTC to its list of stations owned.

== Translators ==
WKCN airs its HD2 and HD3 formats on the following translators:

Broadcast translator for WKCN-HD2
Call sign	Frequency	City of license	FID	ERP (W)	Class	FCC info
W295AY	106.9 FM	Crystal Valley (Columbus, Georgia)	141665	250	D	LMS

Broadcast translator for WKCN-HD3
Call sign	Frequency	City of license	FID	ERP (W)	Class	FCC info
W293BV	106.5 FM	Cuthbert, Georgia	146650	250	D	LMS
