= WDAK =

- Columbus, Georgia; United States
- Broadcast area: West Central Georgia, East Central Alabama
- Frequency: 540 kHz
- Branding: Newsradio 540

Programming
- Format: News/talk
- Affiliations: Fox News Radio; Compass Media Networks; Premiere Networks; Westwood One

Ownership
- Owner: iHeartMedia, Inc.; (iHM Licenses, LLC)
- Sister stations: WAGH; WGSY; WHTY; WSTH-FM; WVRK

History
- First air date: 1940
- Former call signs: WDAK (1940–1985); WEIZ (1985–1986); WDAK (1986–1988); WSTG (1988); WSTH (1988–1994)

Technical information
- Licensing authority: FCC
- Facility ID: 60764
- Class: D
- Power: 4,000 watts day; 38 watts night
- Transmitter coordinates: 32°25′58.5″N 84°57′1.8″W

Links
- Public license information: Public file; LMS
- Webcast: Listen live (via iHeartRadio)
- Website: newsradio540.iheart.com

WDAK (540 AM) is a radio station broadcasting a news/talk format. Licensed to Columbus, Georgia, United States, the station serves the Columbus/Phenix City/Auburn area. The station is owned by iHeartMedia, Inc. (as iHM Licenses) and features programming from Westwood One, Compass Media Networks, Fox News Radio and Premiere Networks. It also broadcasts Columbus State University basketball and baseball games and Troy University sports events. Its studios are in Columbus, east of downtown, and its transmitter is southeast of downtown.

As 540 AM is a Canadian and Mexican clear-channel frequency, WDAK must reduce power during nighttime hours in order to protect the skywave signals of the dominant class A stations on the frequency: CBK, CBT and XEWA.

== History ==
The station began broadcasting in 1940 on a frequency of 1340 kHz with a power of 250 watts. Studios were located in the Martin Building in downtown Columbus. Co-owned WDAK-TV began operation in 1953 on Channel 28. After the TV station was sold in 1958, WDAK was granted 5,000 watts by day, 500 watts by night on 540 kHz, with a new transmitter site and three towers located 5 miles west of Phenix City, Alabama. In April 1967, WDAK moved to The Elms, an antebellum mansion at 1846 Buena Vista Road that was placed on the US Department of the Interior lists of historical sites in 1972. During this entire period, WDAK was owned by the Woodall Family of Columbus, programmed Top 40, and was known as "Big Johnny Reb" or "The Giant of the Valley." Signal and audience-wise, it was the dominant station in the Chattahoochee Valley for decades. In the late 1970s, the station first switched to country music then to various other formats and under different owners. In the late 1990s, the station became "The Sports Monster" with mostly-satellite sports talk programming.
