= WCGQ =

Radio station in Columbus, Georgia, United States

- Columbus, Georgia; United States
- Broadcast area: Columbus metropolitan area
- Frequency: 107.3 MHz
- Branding: Q107-3

Programming
- Format: Contemporary hit radio
- Affiliations: Premiere Networks; United Stations Radio Networks

Ownership
- Owner: PMB Broadcasting, LLC
- Sister stations: WKCN; WRCG

History
- First air date: 1964
- Former call signs: WGBA-FM (1964–1971); WHYD-FM (1971–1973)
- Former frequencies: 107.7 MHz
- Call sign meaning: "Columbus Georgia's Q"

Technical information
- Licensing authority: FCC
- Facility ID: 72089
- Class: C0
- ERP: 100,000 watts
- HAAT: 308 meters (1,010 ft)
- Transmitter coordinates: 32°28′0″N 85°3′20″W

Links
- Public license information: Public file; LMS
- Webcast: Listen live
- Website: pmbsites.com/wcgqfm-home/

WCGQ (107.3 FM, "Q107-3") is a radio station broadcasting a contemporary hit radio format. WCGQ is licensed to serve the community of Columbus, Georgia. Its studios are co-located with four other sister stations on Wynnton Road in Columbus east of downtown, and its transmitter is located in Phenix City, Alabama.

== History ==
WGBA-FM signed on in 1964, and was owned by WGBA, Inc. It was relaunched as WHYD-FM "Hydee" in 1971 airing an automated country music format.

At 6 a.m. on December 26, 1973, WHYD-FM became WCGQ and flipped from country to Top 40.

In the late 1970s, WCGQ increased its transmitting power to 100,000 watts and changed its operating frequency from 107.7 MHz to 107.3 MHz, to more effectively serve the growing Columbus metropolitan area.

In December 2002, McClure Broadcasting, Inc., (Chuck McClure Jr., president) reached an agreement to sell this station to Archway Broadcasting Group (Al Vicente, president/CEO). This was part of a four-station deal, along with WRLD-FM, WRCG, and WKCN, for a reported combined sale price of $15 million.

On July 31, 2008, local investment group PMB Broadcasting LLC (headed up by Jim Martin) purchased this station along with Columbus-area sister stations WRLD-FM, WRCG, WCGQ, and WKCN from Archway Broadcasting Group LLC for a reported sale price of $7.2 million.
