= WIOL (AM) =

Radio station in Columbus, Georgia

Columbus, Georgia; United States
- Frequency: 1580 kHz
- Branding: Hits 104.5

Programming
- Format: Top 40 (CHR)

Ownership
- Owner: Davis Broadcasting, Inc.; (Davis Broadcasting, Inc. of Columbus)
- Sister stations: WEAM-FM, WFXE, WIOL-FM, WKZJ, WOKS

History
- First air date: 1954 (as WCLS)
- Former call signs: WCLS (1954–1984); WIZY (1984–1985); WEAM (1985–2010)

Technical information
- Licensing authority: FCC
- Facility ID: 47088
- Class: B
- Power: 2,300 watts day 1,000 watts night
- Transmitter coordinates: 32°27′55.00″N 85°1′22.00″W
- Translator: 104.5 W283DF (Columbus)

Links
- Public license information: Public file; LMS
- Website: hits1045.com

WIOL (1580 AM) is an American radio station broadcasting a Top 40 (CHR) format. Licensed to Columbus, Georgia, United States, the station serves the Columbus, Georgia, area. The station is owned by Davis Broadcasting of Columbus, Inc. Its studios are co-located with four other sister stations on Wynnton Road in Columbus east of downtown, and its transmitter is located in Phenix City, Alabama.

== History ==
The station originally signed on the air in 1954 as WCLS. It was assigned call letters WIZY on February 1, 1984. On April 1, 1985, the station changed its call sign to the current WEAM.

This station was originally WCLS. The stationed was owned by Charlie Parish through late 1979. Some of the well known "Good Guys" were: Larry James, known as L.J. the D.J., Bill Dean, also known as "Batman Bill Dean", Rod Stacey (Frank Pittman), Rich Galore (Ken Carlisle), Chris Brannon, Kemosabie Joe Johnson, Bill Holly, Don Edwards, Scott Shannon, Buddy Fox.

The station was known as "the rock" of Columbus and led the market in popularity. The station had studios in Columbus, Georgia and in nearby Phenix City, Alabama, where the tower and transmitter were/are located.

The station sold to George H. Buck, Jr. Broadcasting and went to a Southern Gospel/Black Gospel format in 1980, under the direction of General Manager and air personality Glenn Lee.

Buck later sold the call letters in the 80's to someone further north for their station since CLS was the initials of the owner. The new call letters were/are WEAM. The format alternated between talk, and sports. The station is now an all gospel station, owned by Davis Broadcasting, which also owns WEAM FM and other area stations.

In January 2021, WIOL changed their format from sports to top 40/CHR, branded as "Hits 104.5" (simulcast on FM translator W283DF 104.5 FM Columbus).
