= Ledger-Enquirer =

Daily American newspaper

- The June 28, 2011 front page of the Ledger-Enquirer
- Type: Daily newspaper
- Format: Broadsheet
- Owner: Georgia Trust for Local News
- Publisher: Rodney Mahone
- Editor: Ross McDuffie
- Founded: 1828 (as The Columbus Enquirer)
- Language: English
- Headquarters: 945 Broadway; Columbus, Georgia 31901; United States
- Circulation: 10,120 Daily; 12,770 Sunday (as of 2020)
- ISSN: 0898-3860
- Website: ledger-enquirer.com

The Ledger-Enquirer is a newspaper headquartered in downtown Columbus, Georgia, in the United States. It was founded in 1828 as the Columbus Enquirer by Mirabeau B. Lamar who later played a pivotal role in the founding of the Republic of Texas and served as its third President. The newspaper is a two-time recipient of the Pulitzer Prize for Public Service.

People and Machines Behind the Ledger Enquirer Newspapers

== History ==
=== Early History ===
The Enquirer was only the fourth newspaper founded in Georgia, as a weekly paper supporting states' rights and Governor George Troup. After Lamar's wife passed in 1830 he sold the paper and retired from Georgia politics. Subsequent editors supported Whig politicians. The paper switched to publishing daily in 1859. When Southern states discussed the possibility of secession from the Union, the Enquirer was one of the rare Southern papers to call for cooperation; but after secession became official, it decided to support the decision.

In 1874, the Columbus Enquirer merged with Columbus's first daily newspaper, the Daily Sun, to form the Columbus Enquirer-Sun. The paper was published under this name for many years before eventually reverting to the name Columbus Enquirer. The paper was purchased by R. W. Page in 1930. For many years the morning Columbus Enquirer and the afternoon Columbus Ledger, a paper founded in 1886, and also owned by R. W. Page, published a combined Sunday paper known as the Sunday Ledger-Enquirer.

=== 1926 Pulitzer Prize ===
The Columbus Enquirer-Sun was awarded the 1926 Pulitzer Prize for Public Service "for the service which it rendered in its brave and energetic fight against the Ku Klux Klan; against the enactment of a law barring the teaching of evolution; against dishonest and incompetent public officials and for justice to the Negro and against lynching." The prize was awarded to the paper's owners, Julia Collier Harris and Julian Harris–son of author Joel Chandler Harris.

=== 1955 Pulitzer Prize ===
The Columbus Ledger and Sunday Ledger-Enquirer were awarded the 1955 Pulitzer Prize for Public Service for their "complete news coverage and fearless editorial attack on widespread corruption in neighboring Phenix City, Alabama, which were effective in destroying a corrupt and racket-ridden city government. The newspaper exhibited an early awareness of the evils of lax law enforcement before the situation in Phenix City erupted into murder. It covered the whole unfolding story of the final prosecution of the wrong-doers with skill, perception, force and courage."

=== Recent History ===
Knight Newspapers acquired the publication company in 1973, and in 1988 the papers merged the daily edition as well, adopting the name Columbus Ledger-Enquirer. Knight Ridder was acquired by The McClatchy Company in 2006. Beginning Nov. 16, 2019, the Ledger-Enquirer began printing just six days a week, offering a Saturday newspaper in digital-only form. In June 2024, the newspaper announced it will reduce its print frequency to two days a week. In July 2026, McClatchy sold the Ledger-Enquirer and The Macon Telegraph to the National Trust for Local News.

== See also ==
- Media in Columbus, Georgia
- List of newspapers in Georgia (U.S. state)
