= WRCG =

- Columbus, Georgia; United States
- Frequency: 1420 kHz
- Branding: Classic Rock 105.5

Programming
- Format: Classic rock

Ownership
- Owner: PMB Broadcasting LLC
- Sister stations: WKCN; WCGQ; WLTC

History
- First air date: 1928 (as WRBL)
- Former call signs: WRBL (1928–1977)
- Former frequencies: 1170 kHz (1928); 1200 kHz (1928–1941); 1230 kHz (1941–1947)
- Call sign meaning: Radio Columbus Georgia

Technical information
- Licensing authority: FCC
- Facility ID: 72090
- Class: D
- Power: 5,000 watts day; 86 watts night
- Transmitter coordinates: 32°27′54.5″N 85°1′21.8″W
- Translator: 105.5 W288CV (Columbus)

Links
- Public license information: Public file; LMS
- Webcast: Listen live
- Website: pmbsites.com/wrcgam-home/

WRCG (1420 AM) is a classic rock-formatted radio station in Columbus, Georgia. Studios are co-located with four sister stations on Wynnton Road in Columbus east of downtown, and the transmitter is located in Phenix City, Alabama. WRCG is an affiliate of the Atlanta Braves radio network.

== History ==
WRCG was first authorized, as WRBL, on March 27, 1928, to R. E. Martin in Columbus. On May 22, 1928, it was assigned to transmit on 1170 kHz, and on November 11, 1928, was reassigned to 1200 kHz, as part of a major reallocation made under the provisions of the Federal Radio Commission's General Order 40. Although the call letters were randomly assigned by the government from an alphabetic list of available call signs, over the years WRBL was said to stand for "Wireless Radio's Bill Lewis", a broadcast engineer pioneer who put the station on the air, and "Wee-Rebel Radio". Sister stations WRBL-TV (Channel 3) and WRBL-FM 102.9 were named after the original station.

Through the 1940s and 1950s WRBL had a conventional format of CBS Radio Network programming, "pop" and country music, personality, sports and local news. In 1947, the station was reassigned to 1470 kHz, with 5 kW. It added a high-powered (50 kW) FM channel (transmitter on Pine Mountain linked by a pioneering STL system) in 1949 simulcasting its AM. The music was phased out with the rise of FM radio. The station became WRCG (Radio Columbus Georgia) on January 18, 1977, when the TV and radio stations went their separate ways after the death of long time owner, Jim Woodruff, Jr.

In December 2002, McClure Broadcasting, Inc., (Chuck McClure Jr., president) reached an agreement to sell this station to Archway Broadcasting Group (Al Vicente, president/CEO). This was part of a four-station deal, along with WRLD-FM, WCGQ, and WKCN, for a reported combined sale price of $15 million. At the time of the sale, WRCG carried a news/talk radio format.

On July 31, 2008, local investment group PMB Broadcasting LLC (headed up by Jim Martin) purchased this station along with Columbus-area sister stations WRLD-FM, WCGQ, and WKCN from Archway Broadcasting Group LLC for a reported sale price of $7.2 million. The deal was approved by the FCC on October 1, 2008.

In April 2010, WRCG flipped formats from News/Talk to Oldies. Carrying programming from Scott Shannon's True Oldies Channel, the station used the FM frequency of its broadcast translator for its "Boomer 106.9" branding. Later in 2010, formats were flipped again to classic rock. This was followed by numerous subsequent format changes: to active rock branded as "106.9 Really Rocks" on April 4, 2011, to news/talk on January 1, 2012, to southern gospel on November 1, 2014, and to urban adult contemporary, branded as "R&B 92.1" (simulcasting on translator W221DP 92.1 FM Columbus), on November 1, 2016.

On August 1, 2024, WRCG changed their format from urban adult contemporary (which moved to WLTC-HD2) to classic rock, branded as "Classic Rock 105.5" (simulcast on translator W288CV 105.5 FM Columbus).
