= 2022 in American television =

In American television in 2022, notable events included television show debuts, finales, and cancellations; channel launches, closures, and re-brandings; stations changing or adding their network affiliations; information on controversies, business transactions, and carriage disputes; and deaths of those who made various contributions to the medium.

== Awards ==
Category/Organization	80th Golden Globe Awards January 10, 2023	13th Critics' Choice Television Awards January 15, 2023	Producers Guild and Screen Actors Guild Awards February 25 – 26, 2023	75th Primetime Emmy Awards January 15, 2024
Best Drama Series	House of the Dragon	Better Call Saul	The White Lotus	Succession
Best Comedy Series	Abbott Elementary		The Bear	
Best Limited Series	The White Lotus	The Dropout		Beef
Best Television Movie	—N/a	Weird: The Al Yankovic Story		
Best Actor in a Drama Series	Kevin Costner; Yellowstone	Bob Odenkirk; Better Call Saul	Jason Bateman; Ozark	Kieran Culkin; Succession
Best Actress in a Drama Series	Zendaya; Euphoria		Jennifer Coolidge; The White Lotus	Sarah Snook; Succession
Best Supporting Actor in a Drama Series	—N/a	Giancarlo Esposito; Better Call Saul	—N/a	Matthew Macfadyen; Succession
Best Supporting Actress in a Drama Series	Julia Garner; Ozark	Jennifer Coolidge; The White Lotus	—N/a	Jennifer Coolidge; The White Lotus
Best Actor in a Comedy Series	Jeremy Allen White; The Bear			
Best Actress in a Comedy Series	Quinta Brunson; Abbott Elementary	Jean Smart; Hacks		Quinta Brunson; Abbott Elementary
Best Supporting Actor in a Comedy Series	Tyler James Williams; Abbott Elementary	Henry Winkler; Barry	—N/a	Ebon Moss-Bachrach; The Bear
Best Supporting Actress in a Comedy Series	—N/a	Sheryl Lee Ralph; Abbott Elementary	—N/a	Ayo Edebiri; The Bear
Best Actor in a Limited Series	Evan Peters; Dahmer – Monster: The Jeffrey Dahmer Story	Daniel Radcliffe; Weird: The Al Yankovic Story	Sam Elliott; 1883	Steven Yeun; Beef
Best Actress in a Limited Series	Amanda Seyfried; The Dropout		Jessica Chastain; George & Tammy	Ali Wong; Beef
Best Supporting Actor in a Limited Series	Paul Walter Hauser; Black Bird		—N/a	Paul Walter Hauser; Black Bird
Best Supporting Actress in a Limited Series	Jennifer Coolidge; The White Lotus	Niecy Nash-Betts; Dahmer – Monster: The Jeffrey Dahmer Story	—N/a	Niecy Nash-Betts; Dahmer – Monster: The Jeffrey Dahmer Story
Best Talk Series	—N/a	Last Week Tonight with John Oliver		The Daily Show with Trevor Noah
Best Competition Program	—N/a	—N/a	Lizzo's Watch Out for the Big Grrrls	RuPaul's Drag Race

== Television shows ==
=== Shows changing networks ===
Show	Moved from	Moved to	Source
Next Influencer	AwesomenessTV	Paramount+	
Blood & Treasure	CBS	Paramount+	
The Real Love Boat	CBS	Paramount+	
MTV Unplugged	MTV	Paramount+	
AEW Dynamite	TNT	TBS	
Promised Land	ABC	Hulu	
The Orville	Fox	Hulu	
Duncanville	Fox	Hulu	
Power Rangers	Nickelodeon	Netflix (Note: Netflix premiered 13 of 22 of the previous season's episodes on June 15 and October 15, 2021, prior to becoming the series's official home.)	
The Shop	HBO	YouTube	
The Courtship	NBC	USA Network	
Scripps National Spelling Bee	ESPN	Ion	
MTP Daily (Note: Renamed Meet the Press Now with the move)	MSNBC	NBC News NOW	
Chrissy's Court	Quibi	The Roku Channel	
All-Star Futures Game	MLB Network	Peacock	
Days of Our Lives	NBC	Peacock	
Love Island	CBS	Peacock	
Growing Up Chrisley	USA Network	E!	
Harley Quinn	DC Universe	HBO Max	
Pennyworth	Epix	HBO Max	
Thursday Night Football	Fox/NFL Network/Amazon Prime Video	Amazon Prime Video (Note: Just like with ESPN's Monday Night Football broadcasts, a local broadcast syndication simulcast is mandatory for each team's market each week. A limited number of games will remain exclusive to NFL Network due to terms in the network's retransmission consent contracts with cable, satellite, and subscription over-the-top providers.)	
Dancing with the Stars	ABC	Disney+	
Who's Talking to Chris Wallace?	CNN+	CNN/HBO Max	
Tooning Out the News	Paramount+	Comedy Central	

=== Milestone episodes and anniversaries ===
Show	Network	Episode #	Episode title	Episode airdate	Source
Ridiculousness	MTV	800th episode	"Chanel and Sterling CDXIII"	January 7	
American Greed	CNBC	200th episode	"Theranos CEO on Trial"	January 12	
Today	NBC	70th anniversary	"January 14, 2022"	January 14	
Ask This Old House	PBS	20th anniversary	N/A	January 20	
Lone Star Law	Discovery	100th episode	"Lake Saviors"	January 22	
Late Night	NBC	40th anniversary	"David Letterman/Adam Duritz"	February 1	
Miraculous: Tales of Ladybug & Cat Noir	Disney Channel	100th episode	"Qilin"	February 12	
Arthur	PBS Kids	250th episode	"Binky Wrestles with a Story/All Will Be Revealed"	February 21	
Arthur	PBS Kids	25th anniversary	"Blabbermouth/All Grown Up" (series finale)	February 21	
The Goldbergs	ABC	200th episode	"The Wedding"	March 2	
Victor and Valentino	Cartoon Network	100th episode	"An Evening with Mic and Hun"	March 9	
Teen Titans Go!	Cartoon Network	350th episode	"GO!"	March 10	
The Talk	CBS	2,500th episode	N/A	March 11	
Blue Bloods	CBS	250th episode	"Guilt"	March 11	
Evil Lives Here	Investigation Discovery	100th episode	"He Kept Her in a Tree Stump"	March 13 (Note: Early release on March 6 on Discovery+)	
The Bold and the Beautiful	CBS	35th anniversary	"#8736"	March 24	
Curious George	PBS Kids	150th episode	"Lost and Found/George in His Own Backyard"	March 25	
Young Sheldon	CBS	100th episode	"A Solo Peanut, a Social Butterfly and the Truth"	March 31	
Morning Joe	MSNBC	15th anniversary	"April 4, 2022"	April 4	
PAW Patrol	Nick Jr.	200th episode	"Rescue Knights: Pups Save a Dozing Dragon"	April 8	
S.W.A.T.	CBS	100th episode	"The Fugitive"	April 10	
This Is Us	NBC	100th episode	"Katoby"	April 12	
Real Sports with Bryant Gumbel	HBO	300th episode	"April 2022"	April 19	
American Idol	ABC	20th anniversary	"The Great Idol Reunion"	May 2	
NCIS: Los Angeles	CBS	300th episode	"Work & Family"	May 8	
Grey's Anatomy	ABC	400th episode	"You Are the Blood" (season finale)	May 26	
Fear the Walking Dead	AMC	100th episode	"Amina"	May 29 (Note: Early release on May 22 on AMC+)	
The View	ABC	25th anniversary	"Thursday, June 2, 2022"	June 2	
Dynasty	The CW	100th episode	"Vicious Vendetta"	June 3	
Ridiculousness	MTV	900th episode	"Chanel and Sterling DII"	June 15	
South Park	Comedy Central	25th anniversary	"The South Park 25th Anniversary Concert"	August 13	
Doc McStuffins	Disney Junior	10th anniversary	"The Doc is 10!"	August 26	
Raven's Home	Disney Channel	100th episode	"Keeping It 100"	October 14	
SEAL Team	Paramount+	100th episode	"Watch Your 6"	October 23	
The Resident	Fox	100th episode	"For Better or Worse"	October 25	
Ridiculousness	MTV	1,000th episode	"Chanel and Sterling DLXXXVI"	November 11	
Craig of the Creek	Cartoon Network	150th episode	"Back to Cool"	November 11	
The Good Doctor	ABC	100th episode	"Hot and Bothered"	November 21	
Around the Horn	ESPN	20th anniversary	Around The Horn – 20th Anniversary Special	December 13	

=== Shows returning in 2022 ===
The following shows will return with new episodes after being canceled or ended their run previously:

Show	Last aired	Type of return	Previous channel	New Title	New/returning/same channel	Return date	Source
Dirty Jobs	2012	Revival	Discovery	Same	same	January 2	
Joe Millionaire	2003	Revival	Fox	Joe Millionaire: For Richer or Poorer	same	January 6	
Fraggle Rock	1987	Reboot	HBO	Fraggle Rock: Back to the Rock	Apple TV+	January 21	
Person to Person	2012	Revival	CBS	Same	CBS News	January 25	
Celebrity Big Brother	2019	New season	CBS	Same	same	February 2	
Real Husbands of Hollywood	2016	Revival	BET	Real Husbands of Hollywood: More Kevin, More Problems	BET+	February 10	
The Proud Family	2005	Revival	Disney Channel	The Proud Family: Louder and Prouder	Disney+	February 23	
Law & Order	2010	Revival	NBC	Same	same	February 24	
CBS Reports	2010	Revival	CBS	Same	CBS News	February 25	
Mystery Science Theater 3000	2018	New season	Netflix	Same	Gizmoplex	March 4	
Reading Rainbow	2006	Revival	PBS	Reading Rainbow Live	Looped	March 6	
Anderson Cooper Full Circle	2020	New season	CNN Digital	Same	CNN+	March 29	
The Wonder List with Bill Weir	2017	New season	CNN	Same	CNN+	April 21	
The Quest	2014	Revival	ABC	Same	Disney+	May 11	
Don't Forget the Lyrics!	2011	Revival	First-run syndication	Same	Fox	May 23	
Yo! MTV Raps	1995	Revival	MTV	Same	Paramount+	May 24	
All Rise	2021	New season	CBS	Same	OWN	June 7	
College Hill	2009	Revival	BET	Same	BET+	June 27	
Who Do You Think You Are?	2018	New season	TLC	Same	NBC	July 10	
Live PD	2020	Revival	A&E	On Patrol: Live	Reelz	July 22	
Beavis and Butt-Head	2011	Revival	MTV	Same	Paramount+	August 4	
Password	2009	Revival	CBS	Same	NBC	August 9	
Bee and PuppyCat	2016	New season	YouTube	Same	Netflix	September 6	
Ink Master	2020	New season	Paramount Network	Same	Paramount+	September 7	
Quantum Leap	1993	Revival	NBC	Same	same	September 19	
The Mole	2008	Reboot	ABC	Same	Netflix	October 7	
Step Up	2018	New season	YouTube Premium	Same	Starz	October 16	
Inside Amy Schumer	2016	New season	Comedy Central	Same	Paramount+	October 20	
The Surreal Life	2006	New season	VH1	Same	same	October 22	
Manifest	2021	New season	NBC	Same	Netflix	November 4	
E! News	2020	Revival	E!	Same	same	November 14	
Criminal Minds	2020	New season	CBS	Criminal Minds: Evolution	Paramount+	November 24	

=== Shows ending in 2022 ===
End date	Show	Channel	First aired	Status	Source
January 7	Johnny Test	Netflix	2021	Ended	
January 7	Search Party	HBO Max	2016	Ended	
January 14	The Expanse	Amazon Prime Video	2015	Ended	
January 14	The Dr. Oz Show	First-run syndication	2009	Ended	
January 14	Archive 81	Netflix	2022	Canceled	
January 15	Watters' World	Fox News	2015	Ended	
January 21	As We See It	Amazon Prime Video	2022	Canceled	
January 22	Justice with Judge Jeanine	Fox News	2011	Ended	
January 23	Legends of the Hidden Temple	The CW	2021	Canceled	
January 24	Ordinary Joe	NBC	2021	Canceled	
January 25	Our Kind of People	Fox	2021	Canceled	
January 31	Kenan	NBC	2021	Canceled	
February 1	Raising Dion	Netflix	2019	Canceled	
February 3	Kid Cosmic	Netflix	2021	Ended	
February 6	Claws	TNT	2017	Ended	
February 11	Dollface	Hulu	2019	Canceled	
February 14	Adults Adopting Adults	A&E	2022	Canceled	
February 14	Black Market with Michael K. Williams	Vice	2016	Ended	
February 14	4400	The CW	2021	Canceled	
February 15	Queens	ABC	2021	Canceled	
February 17	Yabba Dabba Dinosaurs	HBO Max	2021	Canceled	
February 18	Space Force	Netflix	2020	Canceled	
February 18	Muppet Babies	Disney Jr.	2018	Ended	
February 18	Fancy Nancy (Note: The third and final season of Fancy Nancy received an early, full release on Disney+ on November 12, 2021.)	Disney Jr.	2018	Ended	
February 21	Arthur	PBS Kids	1996	Ended	
February 22	Celebrity Big Brother	CBS	2018	Canceled	
February 24	Keiser Report	RT America	2009	Canceled	
February 25	Reno 911!	The Roku Channel	2003	Canceled	
February 28	Dennis Miller + One	RT America	2020	Canceled	
March 2	Legends of Tomorrow	The CW	2016	Canceled	
March 2	Batwoman	The CW	2019	Canceled	
March 3	Little Ellen	HBO Max	2021	Canceled	
March 10	B Positive	CBS	2020	Canceled	
March 10	Pivoting	Fox	2022	Canceled	
March 10	Go-Big Show	TBS	2021	Canceled	
March 17	Raised by Wolves	HBO Max	2020	Canceled	
March 17	Curious George	Peacock	2006	Canceled	
March 17	Flip or Flop	HGTV	2013	Ended	
March 24	The World Tonight with Kelly Wright & Nayyera Haq	Black News Channel	2020	Canceled	
March 24	AMplified with Aisha Mills	Black News Channel	2021	Canceled	
March 24	Black News Tonight with Marc Lamont Hill	Black News Channel	2021	Canceled	
March 24	Making the Case with Yodit	Black News Channel	2021	Canceled	
March 24	Prime with Charles Blow	Black News Channel	2021	Canceled	
March 25	Start Your Day with Sharon and Mike	Black News Channel	2021	Canceled	
March 25	DC Today	Black News Channel	2020	Canceled	
March 25	BNC Live	Black News Channel	2020	Canceled	
March 29	Promised Land	Hulu	2022	Canceled	
March 30	Astrid & Lilly Save the World	Syfy	2022	Canceled	
March 31	The Fairly OddParents: Fairly Odder	Paramount+	2022	Canceled	
March 31	Warped!	Nickelodeon	2022	Canceled	
April 7	Close Enough	HBO Max	2020	Canceled	
April 8	Woke	Hulu	2020	Canceled	
April 8	Green Eggs and Ham	Netflix	2019	Ended	
April 8	Undercover Boss (returning to CBS for a 12th season)	CBS	2010	Canceled	
April 15	Rainbow Rangers	Nick Jr. Channel	2018	Canceled	
April 19	Pacific Rim: The Black	Netflix	2021	Ended	
April 19	Black-ish	ABC	2014	Ended	
April 22	Reliable Sources Daily	CNN+	2022	Canceled	
April 22	The Source with Kasie Hunt	CNN+	2022	Canceled	
April 22	The Don Lemon Show	CNN+	2022	Canceled	
April 24	Jake Tapper's Book Club	CNN+	2022	Canceled	
April 25	Rex Chapman	CNN+	2022	Canceled	
April 25	Interview Club	CNN+	2022	Canceled	
April 25	Long Slow Exhale	Spectrum	2022	Canceled	
April 25	Better Things	FX	2016	Ended	
April 27	5 Things with Kate Bolduan	CNN+	2022	Canceled	
April 27	Go There	CNN+	2022	Canceled	
April 27	Big Picture with Sara Sidner	CNN+	2022	Canceled	
April 27	The Newscast with Wolf Blitzer	CNN+	2022	Canceled	
April 28	Anderson Cooper Full Circle	CNN+	2022	Canceled	
April 29	Grace and Frankie	Netflix	2015	Ended	
April 29	Ozark	Netflix	2017	Ended	
April 29	Right This Minute	First-run syndication	2011	Canceled	
May 2	The Endgame	NBC	2022	Canceled	
May 4	Good Sam	CBS	2022	Canceled	
May 6	The Wilds	Amazon Prime Video	2020	Canceled	
May 10	Naomi	The CW	2022	Canceled	
May 12	The Garcias	HBO Max	2022	Canceled	
May 14	Amphibia	Disney Channel	2019	Ended	
May 17	Mr. Mayor	NBC	2021	Canceled	
May 18	Beyond the Edge	CBS	2022	Canceled	
May 19	Made for Love	HBO Max	2021	Canceled	
May 19	United States of Al	CBS	2021	Canceled	
May 19	How We Roll	CBS	2022	Canceled	
May 20	Night Sky	Amazon Prime Video	2022	Canceled	
May 22	Saints & Sinners	Bounce	2016	Ended	
May 23	Three Busy Debras	Adult Swim	2020	Canceled	
May 24	This Is Us	NBC	2016	Ended	
May 25	The Good Dish	First-run syndication	2022	Canceled	
May 26	Bull	CBS	2016	Ended	
May 26	Tig n' Seek	HBO Max	2020	Ended	
May 26	The Flight Attendant	HBO Max	2020	Canceled	
May 27	Nick Cannon	First-run syndication	2021	Canceled	
June 3	The Real	First-run syndication	2013	Canceled	
June 8	The Real World Homecoming	Paramount+	2021	Canceled	
June 9	Legendary	HBO Max	2020	Canceled	
June 9	Young Justice	HBO Max	2010	Canceled	
June 9	Queer as Folk	Peacock	2022	Canceled	
June 10	Charmed	The CW	2018	Canceled	
June 10	First Kill	Netflix	2022	Canceled	
June 13	Gentleman Jack	HBO	2019	Canceled	
June 15	Love, Victor	Hulu	2020	Ended	
June 16	Rutherford Falls	Peacock	2021	Canceled	
June 16	Legacies	The CW	2018	Canceled	
June 16	Rat in the Kitchen	TBS	2022	Canceled	
June 17	The Ellen DeGeneres Show	First-run syndication	2003	Ended	
June 17	The Wendy Williams Show	First-run syndication	2008	Ended	
June 19	The Time Traveler's Wife	HBO	2022	Canceled	
June 19	The First Lady	Showtime	2022	Canceled	
June 19	I Love That for You	Showtime	2022	Canceled	
June 20	Mira, Royal Detective	Disney Jr.	2020	Ended	
June 22	Snowflake Mountain	Netflix	2022	Canceled	
June 23	Gordita Chronicles	HBO Max	2022	Canceled	
June 23	Full Frontal with Samantha Bee	TBS	2016	Canceled	
June 23	Desus & Mero	Showtime	2019	Canceled	
June 24	Come Dance with Me	CBS	2022	Canceled	
June 30	Madagascar: A Little Wild	Hulu/Peacock	2020	Ended	
June 30	Side Hustle	Nickelodeon	2020	Canceled	
July 3	The Man Who Fell to Earth	Showtime	2022	Canceled	
July 6	Maggie	Hulu	2022	Canceled	
July 8	Pause with Sam Jay	HBO	2021	Canceled	
July 9	Would I Lie to You?	The CW	2022	Canceled	
July 14	Resident Evil	Netflix	2022	Canceled	
July 15	Farzar	Netflix	2022	Canceled	
July 19	Dancing with Myself	NBC	2022	Canceled	
July 21	Jurassic World Camp Cretaceous	Netflix	2020	Ended	
July 28	Players	Paramount+	2022	Canceled	
July 29	Amber Brown	Apple TV+	2022	Canceled	
July 29	Paper Girls	Amazon Prime Video	2022	Canceled	
July 29	Uncoupled	Netflix	2022	Canceled	
August 2	Tom Swift	The CW	2022	Canceled	
August 4	Moonhaven	AMC+	2022	Canceled	
August 4	The Orville	Hulu	2017	Canceled	
August 5	Daily Mail TV	First-run syndication	2017	Canceled	
August 7	Becoming Elizabeth	Starz	2022	Canceled	
August 8	The Doctors	First-run syndication	2008	Canceled	
August 10	Locke & Key	Netflix	2020	Ended	
August 11	Trolls: TrollsTopia	Hulu/Peacock	2020	Ended	
August 12	A League of Their Own	Amazon Prime Video	2022	Canceled	
August 13	Outside the Lines	ESPN	1990	Canceled	
August 14	Westworld	HBO	2016	Canceled	
August 14	Bridge and Tunnel	Epix	2021	Canceled	
August 15	Better Call Saul	AMC	2015	Ended	
August 15	Who Do You Think You Are?	NBC	2010	Canceled	
August 18	Sweet Life: Los Angeles	HBO Max	2021	Canceled	
August 21	Reliable Sources	CNN	1992	Canceled	
August 21	Flatbush Misdemeanors	Showtime	2021	Canceled	
August 22	Judge Jerry	First-run syndication	2019	Canceled	
August 23	Motherland: Fort Salem	Freeform	2020	Ended	
August 26	Victor and Valentino	Cartoon Network	2019	Ended	
August 26	Partner Track	Netflix	2022	Canceled	
August 27	Black Love	Oprah Winfrey Network	2017	Ended	
August 28	Animal Kingdom	TNT	2016	Ended	
August 29	Tuca & Bertie	Adult Swim	2019	Canceled	
September 5	Roswell, New Mexico	The CW	2019	Canceled	
September 5	In the Dark	The CW	2019	Canceled	
September 7	Everything's Trash	Freeform	2022	Canceled	
September 8	Maury	First-run syndication	1991	Ended	
September 8	The Imperfects	Netflix	2022	Canceled	
September 9	Daily Pop	E!	2017	Canceled	
September 15	Zerlina	MSNBC/Peacock	2020	Canceled	
September 16	Dynasty	The CW	2017	Canceled	
September 16	Fate: The Winx Saga	Netflix	2021	Canceled	
September 17	Snake in the Grass	USA Network	2022	Canceled	
September 18	The Final Straw	ABC	2022	Canceled	
September 22	Nightly Pop	E!	2018	Canceled	
September 25	City on a Hill	Showtime	2019	Canceled	
September 29	DreamWorks Dragons: Rescue Riders	Peacock	2019	Ended	
September 30	The Casagrandes	Nickelodeon	2019	Canceled	
October 2	Blood & Treasure	Paramount+	2019	Canceled	
October 5	Bling Empire	Netflix	2021	Canceled	
October 7	Don Lemon Tonight	CNN	2014	Ended	
October 7	The Midnight Club	Netflix	2022	Canceled	
October 10	Kevin Can F**k Himself	AMC	2021	Ended	
October 11	Black Ink Crew: Chicago	VH1	2015	Canceled	
October 12	Big Shot	Disney+	2021	Canceled	
October 13	Pantheon	AMC+	2022	Canceled	
October 13	Dead End: Paranormal Park	Netflix	2022	Canceled	
October 14	See	Apple TV+	2019	Ended	
October 16	Chesapeake Shores	Hallmark Channel	2016	Ended	
October 18	Duncanville	Hulu	2020	Canceled	
October 19	Growing Up Chrisley	E!	2019	Canceled	
October 20	One of Us Is Lying	Peacock	2021	Canceled	
October 20	Xplay	G4	1998	Canceled	
October 21	Attack of the Show!	G4	2005	Canceled	
October 21	Los Espookys	HBO	2019	Canceled	
October 25	Reboot	Hulu	2022	Canceled	
October 26	Jay Leno's Garage	CNBC	2015	Canceled	
October 27	Family Reunion	Netflix	2019	Ended	
October 27	Vampire Academy	Peacock	2022	Canceled	
October 29	The Cross Connection with Tiffany Cross	MSNBC	2020	Canceled	
October 30	American Gigolo	Showtime	2022	Canceled	
October 30	Stanley Tucci: Searching for Italy	CNN	2021	Canceled	
October 31	New Day	CNN	2013	Ended	
November 2	The News with Shepard Smith	CNBC	2020	Canceled	
November 3	Blockbuster	Netflix	2022	Canceled	
November 8	Man v. Food (returning in 2026 as Men v. Food)	Cooking Channel	2008	Canceled	
November 10	The Good Fight	Paramount+	2017	Ended	
November 10	Inside Amy Schumer	Paramount+	2016	Canceled	
November 10	Warrior Nun	Netflix	2020	Canceled	
November 10	Atlanta	FX	2016	Ended	
November 11	Back on the Record with Bob Costas	HBO	2021	Canceled	
November 11	Ultra Violet & Black Scorpion	Disney Channel	2022	Canceled	
November 17	Dead to Me	Netflix	2019	Ended	
November 18	Inside Job	Netflix	2021	Canceled	
November 20	The Walking Dead	AMC	2010	Ended	
November 23	Pitch Perfect: Bumper in Berlin	Peacock	2022	Canceled	
November 24	Pennyworth	HBO Max	2019	Canceled	
November 28	Avenue 5	HBO	2020	Canceled	
November 29	Queen Sugar	Oprah Winfrey Network	2016	Canceled	
November 30	The Mighty Ducks: Game Changers	Disney+	2021	Canceled	
December 2	The Peripheral	Amazon Prime Video	2022	Canceled	
December 5	Morning Express with Robin Meade	HLN	2005	Canceled	
December 6	Monarch	Fox	2022	Canceled	
December 7	Stargirl	The CW	2020	Canceled	
December 7	The Mysterious Benedict Society	Disney+	2021	Canceled	
December 9	The Mighty Ones	Hulu/Peacock	2020	Ended	
December 11	Let the Right One In	Showtime	2022	Canceled	
December 13	Kindred	Hulu	2022	Canceled	
December 15	Hell of a Week with Charlamagne tha God	Comedy Central	2021	Canceled	
December 16	Paradise PD	Netflix	2018	Ended	
December 16	Shantaram	Apple TV+	2022	Canceled	
December 18	Step Up	Starz	2018	Canceled	
December 19	Red Table Talk	Facebook Watch	2018	Canceled	
December 23	Three Pines	Amazon Prime Video	2022	Canceled	
December 25	Ziwe	Showtime	2021	Canceled	
December 25	Dangerous Liaisons	Starz	2022	Canceled	
December 26	His Dark Materials	HBO	2019	Ended	
December 28	Money Court	CNBC	2021	Canceled	
December 29	South Side	HBO Max	2019	Canceled	
December 30	The Wheel	NBC	2022	Canceled	

=== Entering syndication in 2022 ===
A list of programs (current or canceled) that have accumulated enough episodes (between 65 and 100) or seasons (three or more) to be eligible for off-network syndication and/or basic cable runs.

Show	Seasons	In Production	Notes	Source
9-1-1	6	Yes		
The Good Doctor	6	Yes		
Fuller House	6	No	GAC Family's acquisition of the 2016–20 Netflix sitcom (which joined the network's lineup on February 28) marks the first time that Fuller House has been carried on the same platform as its parent series, Full House (which began airing on GAC Family on February 7).	
American Housewife	5	No	Network syndication in addition to cable reruns	
The Rookie	4	Yes		
The Neighborhood	4	Yes		
Wahlburgers	10	No		

== Networks and services ==
=== Launches ===
Network	Type	Launch date	Notes	Sources
CBS News Miami	OTT streaming	January 24	CBS News and Stations launched CBS News Miami, utilizing news resources from and originating out of the Doral studios of its Miami–Fort Lauderdale duopoly of CBS O&O WFOR-TV and MyNetworkTV affiliate WBFS-TV. The service—the 13th CBS News Local property to launch—offers simulcasts and encores of WFOR/WBFS's newscasts, original content and additional newscasts produced exclusively for the service as well as national programming from the parent CBS News Streaming network.	
Story Television	OTA multicast	March 28	On February 14, Weigel Broadcasting announced that it would launch Story Television on March 28. The network—which is Weigel's sixth national network and its seventh network overall (counting MeTV+, which has its availability limited to select Weigel stations), and the group's first multicast network to focus on unscripted programming—features historical and factual programming drawing primarily from the A&E Networks program library (mainly featuring series originated on A&E and History). In addition to carriage on Weigel-owned stations, Story Television was initially available on stations owned by Hearst Television, Marquee Broadcasting and Maranatha Broadcasting Company.	
CNN+	OTT streaming	March 29	Announced in July 2021 by then-parent WarnerMedia News & Sports (now operating as CNN Global under Warner Bros. Discovery), the subscription companion streaming service to CNN—which is available as an add-on within CNN's apps and websites—features exclusive and original programs including talk shows providing analysis of news and current events, and specialty genre programming (including live shows anchored by Wolf Blitzer, Brian Stelter and Chris Wallace, and additional series hosted by Don Lemon, Jake Tapper and Anderson Cooper) as well as original series and documentaries from CNN's library (such as Anthony Bourdain: Parts Unknown), and interactive programming.	
The Weather Channel en Espaňol	OTT streaming	May 2	Coinciding with the 40th anniversary of the English network's launch, Allen Media Group launches a Spanish language version of The Weather Channel, operating as a 24-hour streaming network initially available on the network's website and mobile app and on co-owned AVOD service Local Now. The Weather Channel en Español offers local and national forecasts (including live and computer-automated forecast programs) as well as selected content from The Weather Channel and its climate and environment initiative/OTT network Pattrn.	
The Weather Channel TV App	OTT streaming	May 2	Also coinciding with TWC's 40th anniversary, Allen Media Group quietly launched The Weather Channel TV App, a direct-to-consumer streaming service—to be sold for $4.99/month—initially available for Roku and Xfinity Flex devices, and Amazon Fire TV, Android TV and Samsung Smart TV models. The service, which is structurally similar to TWC's TV Everywhere app, offers a live linear feed of the channel as well as local weather information (conceptually similar to TWC's interactive weather apps for DirecTV and Dish Network), on-demand clips from its forecast-based shows and unscripted original programming. At the time of its launch, it was unclear if the service was intended as a replacement for Weather Channel Plus, a broader subscription streaming service announced by AMG on June 30, 2021, and originally announced for a Q4 2021 launch, that was to offer content from The Weather Channel (including supplemental digital-only content) and more than 50 streaming news and entertainment channels (similar to those offered by Local Now), along with a likely merger of Entertainment Studios Networks's "SmartTV.com" Roku service (which offers streams and content from ESN's seven entertainment networks) that pre-dated AMG's purchase of The Weather Channel.	
NESN 360	OTT streaming	June 1	The New England Sports Network (NESN)—home to Major League Baseball's Boston Red Sox and the NHL's Boston Bruins, among other sports teams in the region—becomes the first regional sports network to offer a standalone, direct-to-customer streaming service, featuring livestreams of NESN's main and overflow linear channels and a VOD library of its original studio and sports talk programs. Available only to customers in New England (due to MLB owning its own out-of-market streaming rights), the service is based on NESN's legacy app and TV platforms.	
Bally Sports+	OTT streaming	June 23 (in select markets); September 26 (nationwide)	First announced in December 2020, Diamond Sports Group would soft-launch Bally Sports+, a direct-to-customer streaming service offering livestreams and market-specific studio and sports talk programs from regional Bally Sports networks, in five markets where the RSN group maintains in-market Major League Baseball broadcast rights (Kansas City, Detroit, Miami, Milwaukee, and Flor ida). The service—which is based on the network's legacy app and TV platforms, initially on smartphones and tablet devices and subsequently becoming available on Roku devices by the 2022 MLB All-Star Game—expanded to the remainder of Bally Sports' regional markets on September 26 (and is limited to customers residing within those service areas due to MLB owning its own out-of-market streaming rights). Optional bundles providing access to content from multiple Bally Sports networks serving markets where coverage of its individual linear channels overlap were made available to customers following the national launch.	
NFL+	OTT streaming	July 25	On May 25, Sports Business Journal reported the NFL planned to launch an SVOD streaming service in July, which would stream live in-market games as well as additional content (which may include radio broadcasts, podcasts and team-produced content) on smartphones and tablets. The launch of the service follows previous streaming agreements and formats with Yahoo! and Verizon, which expired at the end of the 2021 season.	
AFN Now	OTT streaming	September 20 (test launch at DOD Asia-Pacific bases); November 7 (all DOD worldwide bases)	On July 19, the American Forces Network announced plans to launch an international streaming service, which would provide VOD content (consisting of network newscasts, sports, daytime and late-night talk shows, soap operas, children's programs, and other scripted and unscripted entertainment programming sourced from various U.S.-based television networks) and livestreams of AFN's linear networks free-of-charge to U.S. military personnel and their family members, military retirees, and Department of Defense civilian residents stationed or assigned overseas. On-demand availability of sports events—initially set to include Major League Baseball and NHL games, soccer matches, and NASCAR and IndyCar races—were limited at launch, pending agreements with additional sports leagues. AFN Now soft-launched at DOD military installations in Japan and South Korea on September 20, before expanding to the remainder of the department's overseas installations when it formally launched on November 7.	

=== Conversions and rebrandings ===
Old network name	New network name	Type	Conversion date	Notes	Source
Hillsong Channel	TBN Inspire	OTA multicast and cable/satellite/IPTV	January 1	Trinity Broadcasting Network renamed their joint venture network with Hillsong Church on January 1, a change announced in mid-November 2021, as the American Hillsong Church and Australian mother church have come under controversies involving their personnel, past and present, including the issues of former American church leader Carl Lentz's infidelity and allegations of founder Frank Houston's sexual abuse of children coming to light. Although only planned to be an American-only change, by April, TBN rebranded the network worldwide after Brian Houston resigned from the church after infidelity allegations were brought forward against him and dropped all Hillsong programming.	
DIY Network	Magnolia Network	Cable and satellite	January 5	Chip and Joanna Gaines of Fixer Upper fame announced in an interview on the November 9, 2018, edition of The Tonight Show Starring Jimmy Fallon they were returning to the fold of the former Scripps Networks Interactive networks now owned by Discovery, Inc. to launch a new full-time network based on their Magnolia lifestyle brand after taking a year's hiatus to consider other offers outside of HGTV. The Gaines has the minority stake in the network. The launch was then oft-moved; Discovery announced on January 16, 2020, it would launch October 4 in the same year, but COVID-19 filming restrictions that would affect the network's debut lineup forced Discovery to delay the network's launch date indefinitely on April 21, 2020, with some programming launched as a part of Discovery+ starting on January 4, 2021, instead to build word-of-mouth for the linear network launch. More Magnolia Network content was placed on Discovery+ in mid-July of that year, with the transition of the wireline DIY Network to Magnolia Network occurring on January 5, 2022. After the Discovery properties were folded into Warner Bros. Discovery post-merger, the network was placed under the direct purview of Home Box Office, Inc. (All other Discovery networks were assigned to the Warner Bros. Discovery Networks unit within the company's corporate structure.)	
CBSN	CBS News Streaming	OTT streaming	January 24	CBS News announced the rebrand of its CBSN streaming channel in November 2021, in an attempt to unify branding and newsgathering resources with the division. In addition to retaining daily rolling news blocks and content sourced from and simulcasts of CBS News programs (such as 60 Minutes and Face the Nation), the renamed CBS News Streaming Network incorporated additional original programming including The Uplift (hosted by CBS Mornings co-anchor Tony Dokoupil), a revival of Person to Person (hosted by Norah O'Donnell), Here Comes the Sun (a spin-off of CBS Sunday Morning), and The Dish (an extension of the cooking segments featured on CBS Saturday Morning, featuring that program's anchors). Concurrent with the national network's rebranding and the launch of its Miami service, CBS Television Stations concurrently rebranded its 12 existing local CBSN services under the CBS News Local umbrella.	
Court TV Mystery	Ion Mystery	OTA multicast and cable/satellite	February 24	On February 23, the E. W. Scripps Company announced it would rebrand the true crime and mystery-focused multicast network as an extension of Ion Television effective February 24; Scripps considered the Ion branding more fitting for Mystery, which mainly offers scripted police procedural and mystery series as well as selected true crime documentary series, than that of co-owned Court TV as the main Ion network has aired similarly formatted scripted programs—as was the case, incidentally, during the latter years of Court TV's indirect cable predecessor—for most of its history. (Mystery—which, ironically, is not carried on the same station as the local Ion outlet in many of its markets as of the rebranding date—was among the five existing Scripps-owned subchannel networks that had their local affiliations moved to Ion-owned stations following the company's 2021 acquisition of Ion Media.)	
IMDb TV	Amazon Freevee	OTT streaming	April 28	On April 13, Amazon announced it would rebrand its ad-supported VOD streaming service, IMDb TV, as Amazon Freevee on April 27. Branded as an extension of co-owned online film and TV database IMDb since its founding, the service was launched in January 2019 as IMDb Freedive, before adopting the IMDb TV moniker six months later. The rebrand ended up occurring a day later than announced.	
GAC Family	Great American Family	Cable/satellite	August 20	On July 19, it was announced that GAC Media would rebrand as Great American Media as part of a corporate rebranding. As part of the rebranding, GAC Family and GAC Living were renamed as Great American Family and Great American Living, respectively.	
GAC Living	Great American Living	Cable/satellite	August 20	On July 19, it was announced that GAC Media would rebrand as Great American Media as part of a corporate rebranding. As part of the rebranding, GAC Family and GAC Living were renamed as Great American Family and Great American Living, respectively.	
TVG Network	FanDuel TV	Cable/satellite	September 1	Betfair, which had acquired the then-daily fantasy sports site FanDuel in mid-2018 and transferred the name to its American subsidiary (which included the Television Gaming, or TVG, networks, acquired from Macrovision in 2008), completes the process of re-branding and expanding the horse racing-specific networks to the FanDuel brand with the ongoing legalization of sports gambling across a number of states after the Murphy v. National Collegiate Athletic Association decision struck down the Professional and Amateur Sports Protection Act of 1992 in 2018, with the oncoming 2022 NFL season. Both networks continued to offer horse racing (along with some greyhound racing, which only ran in West Virginia by the end of 2022), with the addition of general sports gaming-specific discussion and debate shows added to the schedule, along with former Good Morning Football host Kay Adams hosting programs for the network. The dropping of the TVG brand also severs the remaining ties to founding owner TV Guide and released the network from a brand licensing agreement with that latter for that initialized name.	
TVG2	FanDuel Racing	Cable/satellite	September 1		
MSG+ MSG+2	MSG Sportsnet; MSG Sportsnet 2	Cable/satellite	September 26	The regional sports network (and its overflow)'s rebrand did not have an officially announced reason, but has been speculated to be to clear up customer confusion as the "Plus" suffix has seen become commonly used for streaming services.	

=== Closures ===
Network	Type	End date	Notes	Sources
NickRewind	Programming block	January 31	TeenNick discontinued the overnight block of Nickelodeon's 1990s and 2000s original series on this date, replacing it with more recent Nickelodeon series already carried on its schedule (such as the original iCarly). Airing under multiple brands since its 2011 premiere, NickRewind had seen most of its programming shift to other ViacomCBS/Paramount streaming venues—including Pluto TV and Paramount+—since 2019.	
RT America	Cable and satellite	March 3	The Washington-based arm of Russian state-funded news channel RT ceased operations in the wake of widespread opposition to Russia's invasion of Ukraine, with production partner T&R Productions discontinuing all live programming and laying off its entire staff. The shutdown occurred two days after its removal by DirecTV, co-owned U-verse TV, and Roku. Outside of its YouTube channel, Dish Network and its Sling TV service were RT America's only remaining linear distributors. (DirecTV had been considering removing RT America prior to the invasion once its contract expired mid-year, while Roku's initial removal of RT's apps in Europe was related to E.U. sanctions on Russian state media outlets.) Ora Media, one of the network's production partners, had also paused production of programs hosted by Dennis Miller (who was among the few on-air hosts to have resigned from the network in protest of the invasion) and William Shatner.	
Fox Life	Cable and satellite	March 31	The American version of Fox Life, a Spanish-language network carrying mainly instructional home programming imported from Latin and South America, and Spanish-language dubs of American reality programming, was discontinued on this date, as The Walt Disney Company continued to wind down extraneous and declining assets from their acquisition of much of the assets of 21st Century Fox, especially those requiring payment of brand licensing fees to Fox Corporation. The network had launched as the U.S. version of Utilisma in 2001, becoming Fox Life in 2013; other international versions of Fox Life had already been wound down through 2020 and 2021 (five other regional versions in Western Europe and Japan were closed or relaunched under new brands and formats under News Corp/Fox ownership between 2009 and 2016), leaving its services in Greece and India as the only remaining Fox Life-branded networks in operation following the U.S. version's closure. The Latin American version of Fox Life, since rebranded as Star Life, also closed on the same date, along with several spin-off networks of National Geographic and Disney in the region.	
CNN+	OTT streaming	April 28	Following its March 29 launch, the CNN streaming spin-off only attained 100,000 subscribers and 10,000 daily viewers after its first week. Executives with Discovery, Inc. (which merged with CNN parent company WarnerMedia to form Warner Bros. Discovery on April 8) were skeptical of CNN's estimated $1 billion investment in CNN+ through 2025, its broader strategy with the service (preferring to incorporate CNN content into HBO Max) and WarnerMedia's decision to launch it weeks before the merger's completion, citing Discovery's experience with launching similar niche streaming services prior to the 2021 launch of Discovery+. Most original programming would migrate over to either HBO Max or the linear CNN cable television channel. Warner Bros. Discovery's CNN Global division announced the shutdown on April 21; its cessation likely resulted in CNN+ becoming the shortest-lived American streaming service to date.	
Real	Cable and satellite	July 15	As part of a transition to a new satellite and the reduction of overall bandwidth for The Erotic Networks, TEN owner New Frontier Media notified providers that it would discontinue its adult pay-per-view network Real on July 15. That network mainly featured unscripted and amateur sexual content.	
Cinemax Go	TV Everywhere website service	July 31	On April 28, Warner Bros. Discovery notified providers that it would shut down the Cinemax Go service on July 31. The TV Everywhere platform—available to subscribers of Cinemax's linear channel tier—had been operating as a web-only service since May 2020, when WBD (then WarnerMedia) discontinued its mobile and smart TV apps as then-owner AT&T ramped up promotion of HBO Max over disparate TVE services. Most of the premium channel's previous original programming has already transitioned to HBO Max, along with its month-to-month film rights. On-demand content from the network remains available through its streaming add-ons and cable/satellite VOD service.	
Black News Channel	Cable/satellite and OTT streaming	August 1	Launched in February 2020 as a linear/streaming news channel targeted at African-Americans, BNC—co-founded by former congressman J.C. Watts and media executive Bob Brillante—ceased operations on August 1, following Allen Media Group's acquisition of the network from majority shareholder Shahid Khan (see July 20 entry); its carriage agreements and satellite feed were transferred over to Allen's existing entertainment-focused OTA multicast network, TheGrio, which incorporates news and commentary programs into its schedule to comply with BNC's carriage deals. BNC suspended live programming on March 25, after failing to meet payroll amidst a class action lawsuit filed in January against parent company BNC Services, LLC and the withdrawal of Khan's funding, and subsequently filed for Chapter 11 bankruptcy on March 28. (Documentaries and other recorded content, including taped rolling news from as early as January, aired in the interim, before the network resumed a limited live daytime schedule on May 9.) BNC had suffered from persistently low viewership (it ranked 123rd out of 124 networks by average viewership according to 2021 Nielsen cable estimates, with a per-program average of 4,000 viewers), and underwent a series of layoffs and voluntary staff departures that had affected 120 employees since December 2021.	
Digi-TV	OTA multicast	August 1	Citing "economic decisions beyond our control," Digi-TV ceased operations after 11 months, making it one of the shortest-lived American OTA multicast networks. Primarily airing on subchannels of stations owned and operated by TelevisaUnivision (among other affiliation agreements), Digi-TV featured scripted, reality, knowledge and lifestyle programs imported from Australia, Canada, and the United Kingdom.	
Olympic Channel	Cable and satellite	September 30	On July 1, NBC Sports Group announced it was shutting down the U.S. version of Olympic Channel, which launched in partnership with the International Olympic Committee in July 2017 (replacing the general entertainment Universal HD, which had succeeded Bravo HD+ in 2004) to provide supplemental coverage of Olympic sports and qualifying events, along with original programming produced by the United States Olympic Committee and archival events. Its programming moves to other NBCUniversal-owned properties (including the Peacock streaming service), with a formal announcement concerning plans for its existing programming and broadcast rights expected in the fall.	
G4	Cable and satellite	November 18	Citing low viewership, on October 16, Comcast Spectacor announced it would shut down G4 for the second time, almost a year after relaunching the gaming-focused pop culture network in November 2021, reportedly due to it failing to meet a $19 million annual revenue goal as well as very low viewership (it ranked last out of 124 networks by average viewership according to Q3 2022 Nielsen cable estimates, with both total day and prime time averages of 1,000 viewers); 45 employees were laid off as a consequence of the planned shutdown. The original incarnation of the network—which was co-developed as a venture of Comcast and NBCUniversal Cable Entertainment—launched in April 2002 (eventually merging with technology news network TechTV in May 2004) and operated for 12 years until it was shut down in December 2014.	
Weatherscan	Cable and satellite	December 9	The Weather Channel's automated 24-hour cable and satellite channel Weatherscan was announced in October 2022 to be shutting down "no later than December 9". The service was dropped by multiple cable providers in preceding years due to declining viewership, the availability of smartphone weather apps, and the age of the technology that Weatherscan runs on.	
Azteca América	OTA Spanish-language network	December 31	On October 21, INNOVATE Corp. announced it would shut down Azteca America on December 31, after 22 years of operation as a competitor to leading Spanish networks Univision and Telemundo. Prior to the announcement, INNOVATE (previously known as HC2 Holdings Inc. until 2021) had been selling most of the full-power stations operated by Azteca America, and began notifying affiliates and advertising partners of the network's planned closure. In addition, Azteca had entered into a content and co-production agreement with competitor Estrella TV that had its news and entertainment programming blended onto that network's schedule.	
Evoca	Subscription OTA network	December 31	Evoca, which operated on a network of ATSC 3.0 broadcasters that required a set-top box (based on Android) to decrypt the signal, shut down December 31, due to lack of funding. Its primary programming was to relay regional sports networks in smaller bundles (and thus lower prices) than cable, satellite or subscription over-the-top services. Evoca users, who are concentrated in the northwestern United States, were allowed to keep their set-top boxes to use them for over-the-top service apps.	

== Television stations ==
=== Station launches ===
Date	Market	Station	Channel	Affiliation	Source
August 1	Panama City, Florida	W20DX-D	20.1	MeTV	

=== Subchannel launches ===
Date	Market	Station	Channel	Affiliation	Source
January 21	Marquette, Michigan	WZMQ	19.7	Ion Television	
March 1	Pensacola, Florida/Mobile, Alabama	WJTC	44.2	Rewind TV	
March 15	San Diego, California	KSWB-TV	69.5	Rewind TV	
April 1	Reno, Nevada	KRXI-TV	11.4	Rewind TV	
May 8	Washington, D.C.	WDDN-LD	23.3	Jewelry Television	
July 6	Memphis, Tennessee	WLMT	30.8	Rewind TV	
July 11	Boise, Idaho	KTVB	7.8	Rewind TV	
August 4	Minneapolis/St. Paul	KMSP-TV	9.8	Story Television	
September 12	Charleston, South Carolina	WGWG	4.5	Heroes & Icons	
September 28	Columbus, Georgia	WXTX	54.4	Dabl	
September 28	Columbus, Georgia	WXTX	54.5	Heroes & Icons	
September 28	Columbus, Georgia	WXTX	54.6	Start TV	
December 27	Bowling Green, Kentucky	WBKO	13.4	Circle	

=== Stations changing network affiliations ===
Date	Market	Station	Channel	Prior affiliation	New affiliation	Notes	Source
January 1	Salinas–Monterey– Santa Cruz, California	KCBA	35.1	Fox	CW+	In December 2021, the News-Press & Gazette Company, owner of CBS affiliate KION-TV, purchased the rights to Fox network and syndicated programming held by KCBA (owned by Seal Rock Broadcasters and operated by Entravision Communications via an LMA). On January 1, KCBA's former intellectual unit—including the Fox affiliation—moved permanently to KION-DT2 (which retained the former's prior "Fox 35" brand and took over KCBA's former channel slots on local cable and satellite providers), while KCBA affiliated with The CW Plus, which relocated from the KION subchannel. The move resulted in the "Big Four" affiliations in the Salinas–Monterey market becoming controlled by only two commercial stations (Hearst-owned NBC affiliate KSBW has carried ABC over its DT2 feed since April 2011).	
January 1	Salinas–Monterey– Santa Cruz, California	KION-TV	46.2	CW+	Fox		
January 3	Bakersfield, California	KUVI-DT	45.1	True Crime Network	Twist		
January 21	Marquette, Michigan	WJMN-TV	3.1	CBS	MyNetworkTV (primary); Antenna TV (secondary)	On January 20, Lilly Broadcasting—as part of affiliation renewals involving sister stations WENY/Elmira, New York, and WSEE/Erie, Pennsylvania—announced that WZMQ would take over as the Upper Peninsula's CBS affiliate effective the following day, replacing Nexstar Media Group-owned WJMN-TV, which had carried the network's programming since February 1992, a byproduct of CBS's purchase of the station and Green Bay sister WFRV (of which WJMN served as a semi-satellite from its October 1969 sign-on until the CBS disaffiliation) from Midwest Television and Radio. WJMN affiliated with MyNetworkTV (previously on WZMQ) and added programming from Nexstar-owned Antenna TV to fill vacated overnight/early morning and weekend slots, while retaining most of its syndicated content and expanding its twice-daily evening newscasts to one hour each. CBS was relegated to WZMQ-DT2 (displacing both Start TV to WZMQ-DT4 and that subchannel's former Ion Television affiliation to the newly launched WZMQ-DT7), while adding morning weather inserts and evening newscasts produced primarily out of WSEE/WICU's Erie News Now operation in downtown Erie. (As MeTV remained on WZMQ's main feed, the switch marked the first known instance of a "Big Four" network maintaining a subchannel-only affiliation with a station primarily affiliated with a network intended for subchannel distribution.)	(Note: On January 21, Nexstar Media Group announced it had renewed the affiliation contracts of its 39 CBS stations, including those of WFRV and 11 other affiliates that continued to carry the CBS schedule on day-to-day status after their prior affiliation agreements expired on December 31, 2021, amidst the continuing negotiations without a temporary extension. Of the 13 Nexstar-run CBS stations that had their contracts lapse overall, WJMN (which was notified of the move of CBS to WZMQ only three days before the switch) was the only station that did not remain with the network.)
January 21	Marquette, Michigan	WZMQ	19.2	Start TV	CBS		
January 25	Alpena, Michigan	WBKB-TV	11.2	Fox/MyNetworkTV (moved to 11.4)	NBC	On January 24, Marks Radio Group announced that WBKB-DT2 would switch to NBC the following day. In turn, the subchannel's former Fox, MyNetworkTV and syndicated programming inventory was moved to a new DT4 subchannel of that station. The addition of NBC programming results in the "Big Four" affiliations in the Alpena market becoming controlled by the market's sole commercial station (WBKB-TV has been a primary CBS affiliate since its September 1975 sign-on and has also carried ABC on its DT3 feed since January 2013) and gave NBC local broadcast outlets in all 210 Nielsen DMAs. (The CW, affiliated with cable-only CW Plus outlet "WBAE", is the only remaining major network not available over-the-air within the Alpena DMA.) Previously, NBC programming had been provided to the area on cable and satellite via WTOM-TV/Cheboygan, which provides fringe over-the-air coverage to Alpena.	
January 31	Honolulu, Hawaii	KIKU	20.1	ShopHQ	Multicultural Independent	On January 31, Allen Media Broadcasting took over ownership of KIKU, thus making the 39-year-old independent a sister station of ABC affiliate KITV. It also brought back its previous multicultural schedule of Japanese, Chinese, and Tagalog-language programming that was removed by its then-owner WRNN-TV Associates in favor of a controversial deal with ShopHQ started on July 1, 2021, to exploit their must-carry coverage across all their stations (a network already universally available through cable and satellite, and only 15 channels away from KIKU's channel position on Oceanic Spectrum, the state's major cable provider), which especially sparked outrage from local viewers and the station's own management (which will remain under Allen ownership) for removal of local-targeted programming in favor of a low-rated Mainland shopping network. In addition, KIKU will also serve as a secondary ABC affiliate for KITV, including simulcasting its newscasts (as well as adding an extra hour of its morning newscast) and regular syndicated programming.	
April 15	San Francisco, California	KOFY-TV	20.1	Independent	Grit	KOFY ended all efforts to program as an independent station on its main channel on this date, and become a Grit affiliate.	
May 8	Washington, D.C.	WDME-CD	48.1	Jewelry Television	MeTV	WAZT-CD, a station sold to Weigel Broadcasting in October 2021 by Venture Technologies Group for $3 million, finishes up its existing Jewelry Television affiliation agreement, changing its calls on April 21, to WDME-CD. On May 8, 2022, it moves onto becoming the market's O&O for MeTV, replacing WTTG-DT2, along with adding Weigel's other networks to its subchannels.	
June 1	Las Vegas, Nevada	KHSV	21.1	Heroes & Icons	MeTV	On June 1, KLAS-TV moved Rewind TV from 8.4 to 8.2, and added Shop LC on 8.4, sending MeTV to KHSV's main subchannel, displacing Heroes & Icons and Decades to subchannels 21.2 and 21.6 respectively.	
June 3	Appleton–Green Bay, Wisconsin	WACY-TV	32.1	MyNetworkTV	Independent	On June 3, 2022, WACY disaffiliated with MyNetworkTV with no public notice, and returned to being an unaffiliated independent station for the first time since January 1995.	
July 28	Anaheim-Los Angeles, California	KDOC-TV	56.1	Independent	TCT	After the sale by Ellis Communications to TCT for $41 million and a farewell special, KDOC-TV becomes the Christian television network's West Coast flagship station, though its other subchannels remain associated with their previous networks.	
September 1	Abilene, Texas	KTES-LD	40.1	MeTV	Comet		
September 1	Bowling Green, Kentucky	WBGS-LD	34.1	ABC (as a WBKO translator)	Telemundo	WBKO simulcast moves to WBGS's second digital subchannel.	
September 1	Nashville, Tennessee	WTNX-LD	15.1	NBC (as a WSMV-TV translator)	Telemundo	WSMV simulcast moves to WTNX's second digital subchannel	
September 12	Charleston, South Carolina	WGWG	4.1	Heroes & Icons	MeTV		
September 19	Boston, Massachusetts	WSBK-TV	38.1	MyNetworkTV	Independent	On September 19, CBS News and Stations-owned WSBK and WBFS quietly disaffiliated from MyNetworkTV with the start of the new television season and replace the timeslots that the service's programming occupied with syndicated programs and local newscasts produced by their sister stations (WBZ-TV and WFOR-TV, respectively). The absence of any replacement affiliates for MyNetworkTV in Miami and Boston leaves the programming service with its largest loss of TV households by market rank.	
September 19	Miami, Florida	WBFS-TV	33.1	MyNetworkTV	Independent	On September 19, CBS News and Stations-owned WSBK and WBFS quietly disaffiliated from MyNetworkTV with the start of the new television season and replace the timeslots that the service's programming occupied with syndicated programs and local newscasts produced by their sister stations (WBZ-TV and WFOR-TV, respectively). The absence of any replacement affiliates for MyNetworkTV in Miami and Boston leaves the programming service with its largest loss of TV households by market rank.	
November 2	Tijuana, Baja California-San Diego, California	XHAS-TDT	33.1	Azteca América	Spanish independent	It was announced in October 2022 that Intermedia, owner of XHILA-TDT in Mexicali, would take over programming for the station on November 2, to be called "Canal 33".	
November 10	Abilene, Texas	KTES-LD	40.1	Comet	TBD		
November 13	Chattanooga, Tennessee	WDSI-TV	61.1	This TV	True Crime Network		
November 14	Zanesville, Ohio	WHIZ-TV	18.2	Cozi TV (moved to 18.3)	Fox (primary); MyNetworkTV (secondary)	On October 24, Marquee Broadcasting-owned NBC affiliate WHIZ-TV, the only full-power commercial station in the small Zanesville market, moved its DT2 subchannel's affiliation Cozi TV to DT3 and announced that DT2 would be joining Fox and MyNetworkTV effective November 14 (DT2 simulcasted WHIZ-TV's main subchannel in the interim). This left Glendive, Montana, the smallest media market in the country, as the only Nielsen DMA without either a locally based Fox affiliate. Previously, Fox was shown on the DT3 subchannel of ABC affiliate WSYX, and before that WTTE, while WSYX's DT2 subchannel showed MyNetworkTV, all in nearby Columbus, had served the Zanesville area on local cable and satellite systems.	

=== Subchannels changing network affiliations ===
Date	Market	Station	Channel	Prior affiliation	New affiliation	Notes	Source
January 1	Akron/Cleveland, Ohio	WBNX-TV	55.2	Religious Independent (The Happy Channel)	Buzzr		
January 1	Las Vegas, Nevada	KLAS-TV	8.3	Movies!	SportsGrid		
January 1	Lexington, Kentucky	WDKY-TV	56.2	Comet	Rewind TV		
January 21	Marquette, Michigan	WZMQ	19.4	Ion Television	Start TV		
January 22	Baltimore, Maryland	WMAR-TV	2.2	Laff	Grit		
January 22	Baltimore, Maryland	WMJF-CD	39.4	Grit	Laff		
March 1	San Diego, California	KFMB-TV	8.3	Grit	Laff		
March 1	San Diego, California	KGTV	10.3	Laff	Grit		
May 8	Washington D.C.	WTTG	5.3	MeTV	Start TV		
June 1	Las Vegas, Nevada	KLAS-TV	8.2	MeTV	Rewind TV		
June 1	Las Vegas, Nevada	KLAS-TV	8.4	Rewind TV	Shop LC		
June 1	Las Vegas, Nevada	KHSV	21.2	Decades	Heroes & Icons		
June 1	Las Vegas, Nevada	KHSV	21.6	QVC	Decades		
June 1	Las Vegas, Nevada	KVCW	33.4	This TV	Local Now		
August 1	Panama City, Florida	WMBB	13.2	MeTV	Antenna TV		
September 1	Bozeman, Montana	KDBZ-CD	6.2	MeTV	Comet		
September 1	Butte, Montana	KTVM-TV	6.2	MeTV	Comet		
September 1	El Paso, Texas	KDBC-TV	4.3	MeTV	Antenna TV		
September 1	Eureka, California	KAEF-TV	23.2	MeTV	TBD		
September 1	Eureka, California	KAEF-TV	23.3	Movies!	Comet		
September 1	Johnstown, Pennsylvania	WJAC-TV	6.2	MeTV	Charge!		
September 1	Kalispell, Montana	KCFW-TV	9.2	MeTV	Comet		
September 1	Missoula, Montana	KECI-TV	13.2	MeTV	Comet		
September 1	Portland, Oregon	KATU	2.2	MeTV	Charge!		
September 1	Providence, Rhode Island	WJAR	10.2	MeTV	Charge!		
September 1	Redding, California	KRCR-TV	7.2	MeTV	TBD		
September 1	Redding, California	KRCR-TV	7.3	Movies!	Comet		
September 1	Charleston, South Carolina	WCIV	36.3	MeTV	Stadium		
September 28	Columbus, Georgia	WRBL	3.2	MeTV	Rewind TV		
September 28	Columbus, Georgia	WXTX	54.2	Movies!	MeTV		
October 3	Chicago, Illinois	WGN-TV	9.3	Court TV	Grit		
October 3	Portland, Oregon	KRCW-TV	32.3	Court TV	Grit		
October 3	Portland, Oregon	KPDX	49.4	Grit	Court TV		
October 20	Des Moines, Iowa	WHO-DT	13.2	SportsGrid	Rewind TV		
October 20	Greenville-New Bern-Washington, North Carolina	WNCT-TV	9.3	True Crime Network	Rewind TV		
October 20	Greenville-Spartanburg, South Carolina - Asheville, North Carolina	WYCW	62.3	True Crime Network	Rewind TV		
October 20	Knoxville, Tennessee	WATE-TV	6.3	SportsGrid	Rewind TV		
October 20	New Orleans, Louisiana	WGNO	26.3	Dabl	Rewind TV		
October 20	Portland, Oregon	KOIN	6.3	SportsGrid	Rewind TV		
October 20	San Francisco, California	KRON-TV	4.3	SportsGrid	Rewind TV		
October 28	Las Vegas, Nevada	KLAS-TV	8.3	SportsGrid	getTV		
October 28	Las Vegas, Nevada	KVCW	33.4	Local Now	This TV		
October 28	Nashville, Tennessee	WKRN-TV	2.2	SportsGrid	Ion Mystery		
October 31	Hagerstown, Maryland	WDVM-TV	25.2	SportsGrid	Ion Mystery		
October 31	Grand Rapids, Michigan	WOOD-TV	8.3	SportsGrid	TheGrio		
October 31	Norfolk/Portsmouth, Virginia	WAVY-TV	10.2	SportsGrid	Stadium		
October 31	Tampa, Florida	WFLA-TV	8.2	SportsGrid	Charge!		
November 1	Sacramento, California	KTXL	40.3	Court TV	Grit		
November 10	Salt Lake City, Utah	KTVX	4.4	Heroes & Icons	TheGrio		

=== Station closures ===
Station	Channel	Affiliation	Market	Date	Notes	Source
WYCC	20.1	First Nations Experience	Chicago, Illinois	June 1	Chicago's former official second member station for PBS, WYCC, sees its license returned by its owners and signs off permanently. The station, which had launched as WXXW by Window to the World Communications (founders and owners of primary PBS station WTTW) in 1965, had a history of 'secondhand' status in the Chicago market, being neglected in its first WTTW ownership and going silent in 1974 due to transmitter disrepair. Sold to the City Colleges of Chicago in 1983, it returned to the air as a city-focused educational service with a popular afternoon homework helpline program, other local programming, and British import programming and secondary PBS content filling its schedule, but also faced the whims of Chicago politics, with mayors and city councils varying their funding over the years. It (along with Northwest Indiana PBS member station WYIN) also faced continued hostility from Window to the World, which continually angled to be the exclusive PBS member station for Chicagoland and disallowed any attempt by either station to diversify and compete, using their role as a national programming provider to stop any such attempts for both stations. By 2017, the City Colleges sold WYCC's spectrum during the FCC spectrum auction for nearly $16 million, intending for it to sign off by the end of 2017, but was pressured to sell to another party to preserve its format. Window to the World re-acquired the station's license by March 2018, entering into a technical channel sharing agreement with WTTW to keep WYCC alive, but did not rehire any WYCC staff, and soon reduced it to an unpublicized passthrough of the FNX Native American-focused network. WTTW ran into its own funding issues during the pandemic and decided to relinquish the WYCC license to save the money being used for WYCC's regulatory compliance, along with the FNX affiliation. In technicality, the launch of World Channel on WYCC's former spectrum share as WTTW-DT5 replaced it.	
WVTA	41.#	PBS	Windsor, Vermont	November 23	On February 17, 2017, Vermont PBS announced that it had sold the WVTA broadcast license for $56 million in the FCC's spectrum auction. In a statement, the network said that its other signals would be upgraded to cover the area served by WVTA. The WVTA license, which continued on the WVER multiplex, was then surrendered for cancellation on November 23, 2022.	
