= Hillsong: A Megachurch Exposed =

Docuseries about Hillsong Church

- Country of origin: United States
- Original language: English
- No. of seasons: 1
- No. of episodes: 4

Original release
- Network: Discovery+
- Release: March 24 – December 29, 2022

Hillsong: A Megachurch Exposed is a 2022 docuseries about the Hillsong Church originally released on Discovery+.

== Background ==
Hillsong: A Megachurch Exposed is a four-part docuseries by Discovery+. The show released its fourth episode under the TLC network. The episode was called "Hillsong: The Newest Revelations". The trailer for the show was released on February 16, 2022. The series discusses the friendship between Justin Bieber and Carl Lentz. The series claims that Hillsong exploited volunteer labor and became rich from donations. The show also contains claims of sexual abuse in the church. The series includes interviews with Ranin Karim. The show also includes interviews with Hannah Frishberg, Jaclyn Hayes, Janice Lagata, and Ben Kirby. The show had a companion podcast called Hillsong: A Megachurch Shattered. The first episode of the show outlines the "Hillsong formula". Phil Dooley, the pastor of Hillsong Cape Town, commented on the documentary saying that it "is far removed from ... the truth".

== Episodes ==
No.	Title	Original release date
1	"Welcome Home"	March 24, 2022
The first episode covers the origins of Hillsong Church, featuring interviews with former members, journalists and experts including Ella Hardy, Bruce Herwig and Kelsey McKinney. Following in the footsteps of his pastor father Frank Houston, Brian Houston establishes Hills Christian Centre in north-western Sydney. Influenced by American televangelists including Casey Treat, Jim Bakker and Benny Hinn, Houston decides to use marketing techniques to promote his Christian faith, which is premised around treating members and converts as consumers. The episode also covers the establishment of Hillsong's record label Hillsong Music as a vehicle for church growth and revenue generation, leading to the establishment of numerous satellite churches across Australia during the 1990s and 2000s. As Hillsong expands, it diversifies into other ventures including concert, music, a leadership college, cinema, conferences, publishing and branded clothing. In the 2010s, Hillsong expands overseas including the United States. The episode also covers the rise of Carl Lentz as the pastor of Hillsong NYC, who uses his celebrity image and social media to boost membership.
2	"Critical Mass"	March 24, 2022
The second episode covers both the Carl Lentz scandal and Hillsong staff member Jason May's indecent assault against former Hillsong College student Anna Crenshaw. A rising star at Wavecrest Church, Lentz is recruited as the pastor for Hillsong NYC, the mega church's flagship American congregation. The documentary features interviews with Lentz's former mistress Rabin Karim, Anna Crenshaw, her father Pastor Ed Crenshaw and a former Hillsong NYC worship team member, who was suspended by Lentz for having premarital sex with her boyfriend. In the first half, Lentz's extramarital affair with Karim is contrasted with the church's socially conservative teachings on sex and marriage. In the second half, the Crenshaws accuse Hillsong's leadership of attempting to cover up May's indecent assault, resulting in them pursuing legal action and going to the media.
3	"Revelations"	March 24, 2022
The third episode focuses on Frank Houston's sexual assault against Brett Sengstock and Brian Houston's testimony at the 2014 Royal Commission into Institutional Responses to Child Sexual Abuse. Houston had denied allegations of covering up Frank's sexual abuse. The documentary also features interviews with several former Hillsong insiders and Australian Member of Parliament Andrew Wilkie, who under parliamentary privilege accused Brian of covering up his father's sexual assault against Sengstock. In addition, the documentary scrutinises what it regards as Hillsong's unethical financial and labour practices including the alleged exploitation of Hillsong College students as interns.
4	"Hillsong: The Newest Revelations"	December 29, 2022
The fourth episode deals with the aftermath of the documentary's release, interviewing several former Hillsong members who had contributed to its production. The episode features several new talking heads including Christian Post journalist Leonardo Blair, former Hillsong Atlanta Pastor Allen Parr and Christian journalist Roxanne Stone. Blair talks about the findings of an international investigation into Hillsong NYC detailing a culture of excess by former Pastor Carl Lentz and the church leadership including the alleged treatment of interns as servants. The episode also mentions a non-consensual sexual allegation against former Hillsong Dallas Reed Boggard. The episode also explores the chain of events leading to Brian Houston's resignation as Hillsong Global senior pastor in 2022.

== Release ==
In New Zealand, the series was released on Warner Bros. Discovery New Zealand's ThreeNow streaming platform.
