= Rocknations =

- Location: Bradford, West Yorkshire
- Country: United Kingdom
- Website: http://www.rocknations.com

History
- Founded: 2001
- Founder: Steve Gambill

Rocknations is the young people's ministry of Life Church UK in Bradford, England, Belfast, Northern Ireland and Warsaw, Poland. Weekly meetings are held for teenagers and young adults. Rocknations is also the name of the church's annual youth conference, held in August each year.

== Rocknations conference ==
Rocknations Conference 2012.

The first Rocknations conference, for young people and their leaders, was held by Steve Gambill in 2001, with about 70 delegates. It has since grown to be one of the biggest Christian youth conferences in Europe, with attendance figures in excess of 2,000.

The conference continues to be an annual event on the LIFE Church UK Calendar and has been hosted in most recent years by David and Abigail Niblock and I AM FUTURE, the church's youth band. The conference features a mix of in-house and visiting speakers, live bands and various activities to keep delegates occupied. Activities usually include a skate park, football competitions, a game-zone, seminars and dance and music workshops.

Speakers have included Reinhard Bonnke, Joel Houston, Peter & Laura Toggs, Chad Veach, Andre Lesur, Mal Fletcher, Phil Dooley, Matthew Barnett, Ed Young and Carl Lentz. Visiting bands have included Switchfoot, Tree63, The Gentlemen, Gungor, Guvna B, Parachute Band and Hillsong United.

In past years, conference delegates have been given the opportunity to spend time in deprived areas of Bradford, helping with the church's social justice projects.

== Global reach ==
In recent years, Rocknations has expanded its reach using radio and TV. Programmes are broadcast on God TV and United Christian Broadcasters. The ministry also has a weekly half-hour slot on Cross Rhythms radio; these programmes also released as podcasts.
