= Chad Veach =

American evangelical pastor

- Occupations: Pastor and author
- Spouse: Julia Veach
- Website: www.zoechurch.org

Chad Veach is an American evangelical pastor, author, and founder of Zoe Church, a youth-oriented Christian congregation that is based in Los Angeles, California. Veach has been the subject of significant mainstream press coverage, which often focuses on Veach's taste in streetwear and sneakers and his links to celebrities like actor Chris Pratt, the Kardashians and singer Justin Bieber, which have been chronicled on Veach's Instagram account.

== Early life and family ==
Veach was born in 1979 and grew up on Whidbey Island where he graduated in 1998 from Oak Harbor High School in Oak Harbor, Washington. His father, Dave Veach, is a District Supervisor with Foursquare Church in Tacoma, Washington. Growing up he attended Shelton Christian Fellowship (now called Gateway Christian Fellowship), as his parents were youth pastors there. As a young man, Veach “wasn't solid in his faith at all,” according to his father. In an interview with The Christian Post, Veach said that he had "a foot in, a foot out" of church as a teenager, but that attending a Promise Keepers event was a turning point for him: "it's the typical prodigal son story who has an experience and then says, 'Wait, what I had back home was way better. I'm going back home and to church.' I had sown some wild oats but nothing too crazy." Veach's two siblings are also pastors.

Veach attended Life Pacific College, a Foursquare denominational Bible college located in San Dimas, California, graduating in 2002.

== Career ==
Veach started as a youth pastor in El Monte, California. In 2004, Veach took a job counseling teens and young adults for United Generation ministry in Puyallup, Washington. In 2013, he became associated with Judah Smith, spiritual adviser to Justin Bieber and lead pastor of Churchome, a multi-site megachurch based in Seattle and Los Angeles.

In 2014, Chad Veach and his wife Julia Veach moved to Los Angeles and started their ministry with informal gatherings at their home. Zoe Church began its services in borrowed space in a small church in Santa Monica and, after one day at the 1 Oak nightclub in Hollywood. Zoe Church had services at the Fonda nightclub. Zoe Church moved to the El Rey Theatre on Wilshire Boulevard. Services were also held at the Million Dollar Theater in downtown Los Angeles. Veach told the New York Times that he modeled Zoe Church after Hillsong Church and Church of the Highlands.

In 2017, Veach and Judah Smith accompanied Justin Bieber on his Purpose World Tour, reportedly to serve as “positive influences.” Videos of Veach with Justin Bieber have appeared on Veach's Instagram account.

In August 2022, Zoe Church bought the 98 year old Buddhist Temple in Highland Park for their future church site.

== Personal life ==
Veach is married to the former Julia MacGregor. The couple has four children.

Veach has a tattoo on his left arm that reads “Better at 70,” in the handwriting of Justin Bieber.

== Anti-LGBTQ stances ==
Veach and his wife Julia were executive producers on the 2017 film The Heart of Man, a docudrama on "sexual brokenness". The film treats same-sex attraction, porn addiction, and infidelity as examples of such brokenness.

Veach's church has been criticized by actor Elliot Page for being "infamously anti-LGBTQ". Actor Chris Pratt spoke on the matter, denying the anti-LGBTQ stance and saying that the Zoe Church "opens its doors to absolutely everyone".

Chad Veach and Zoe Church are both affiliated and associated with Hillsong Church by attending and speaking at Hillsong conferences and structuring Zoe Church similar to Hillsong Church. Veach was close friends with Hillsong's pastor, Carl Lentz. Veach told The New York Times that he modeled his church, in part, after Hillsong.

== Sources ==
- Christian, Scott (12 April 2019). "WWJD: The Ethical Conundrum of Mega-Church Preachers in Super-Expensive Sneakers". Esquire.
- Graham, Ruth (22 March 2018). "Chad Veach and the Media's Long Love Affair With Hipster Pastors". Slate.
- Holson, Laura M. (17 March 2018). "This Preacher Would Be Happy to Share Your Bowl of Açaí". The New York Times.
- Jones, Allie (6 August 2018). "A Guide to the Evangelical Celebrities and Pastors Dominating Hollywood". The Cut.
- Martinez, Jessica (15 July 2014). "'Kimye' Pastor Rich Wilkerson Jr., Chad Veach Credit Jesus' Relevant Message for Their Platform". The Christian Post.
- Ross, Martha (12 February 2019). "Is Chris Pratt's evangelical church really welcoming to LGBTQ people?". The San Jose Mercury News.
- Schube, Sam (7 August 2017). "Hypepriests: The Grail-Wearing Pastors Who Dress Like Justin Bieber". GQ.
- Turner, Laura (6 February 2019). "The Rise of the Star-Studded, Instagram-Friendly Evangelical Church". Vox.
