= Kelly Wright =

American television journalist

- Education: Oral Roberts University
- Occupation: Journalist

Kelly Wright is the Senior White House Correspondent at the Christian Broadcasting Network, having left his position in February 2025 as host and executive producer of America's Hope with Kelly Wright under New Tang Dynasty Television. Formerly with Fox News, he was the co-anchor of America's News Headquarters on Saturday, and was based in the network’s Washington, D.C., bureau. He was a co-host of Fox and Friends Weekend from July 2006 to January 2008.

Most recently, Wright reported from Tampa, Florida, on the Terri Schiavo story. In 2004 Wright spent nearly three months reporting on the developments in Iraq. He was among the first reporters to cover the Abu Ghraib prison scandal and the subsequent court martial cases held in Baghdad. Wright also spent time embedded with U.S. and British troops, reporting on the military’s humanitarian efforts in Baghdad, Basrah, and Mosul. Wright also provided coverage on U.S. forces training Iraqi security forces. Additionally, he reported on the historic U.S. handover of sovereignty to Iraq. Beyond Iraq, Wright extensively covered the 2004 presidential election, including the Democratic presidential race, the New Hampshire primary, and the South Carolina primary. In October 2003, Wright reported live from the Congressional Black Caucus/FNC Democratic presidential candidate debate in Detroit.

Before joining Fox News Channel, Wright worked as an anchor/reporter at WAVY-TV/WVBT-TV in Norfolk, VA, co-anchoring the Fox affiliate's first primetime newscast (produced by WAVY) from 1998 until 2003. During his tenure there, he covered a wide range of stories, including a historical event in Benin, West Africa, where African presidents Mathieu Kérékou of Benin, Jerry Rawlings of Ghana, and representatives from the United States, England, France and the Dominican Republic apologized for their role in slavery.

Previously, Wright served as a weekend news anchor and reporter for WRAL-TV in Raleigh, N.C. Wright secured numerous rare interviews, including a 1996 exclusive interview with O. J. Simpson following the criminal court trial.

Wright has also served as a general assignment reporter for WWOR-TV in New York. He reported on numerous high-profile newsmakers and events for the station, including John Gotti, Amy Fisher, the Howard Beach and Bensonhurst murder trials, and the 1989 Central Park jogger rape case.

Wright began his journalism career in 1977 while serving in the United States Army.

Wright has received numerous awards for his reporting, including two local Emmy Awards for his developing, reporting and co-producing a documentary and news series on the transatlantic slave trade.

In 2017, Wright joined a lawsuit against Fox News for racial discrimination. Documents submitted to the court showed that Wright's annual salary while working at Fox was $400,000.

Wright also worked for the Black News Channel.
