= Florida's News Channel =

American regional cable news network (1998–2003)

- Type: Cable network
- Country: United States
- Availability: Florida
- Owner: Bob Brillante
- Key people: Frank Watson, VP/general manager; Harvey Bennett, news director; Gordon Graham, news anchor; Jim Hillger, chief engineer, Kraig Beahn Jr., chief systems administrator
- Launch date: September 1998

Florida's News Channel (FNC) was a regional cable news network available on Florida's cable television systems (e.g. Comcast, GTE, TCI Cable, AT&T Broadband, and Continental Cablevision) that operated from 1998 to 2003. FNC's viewers were the first to see virtual reality news environments with customized local scenery in each of Florida's seven major television markets.

FNC created nightly newscasts for a black audience. These newscasts were hosted by anchors Gordon Graham, Val Bracy, and Karla Winfrey.

Frank Watson served as FNC's vice president and general manager. Partners included Willie E. Gary, Evander Holyfield, Cecil Fielder, Marlon Jackson, and Alvin James.

Comcast dropped FNC due to lack of viewer interest. The legal dispute between FNC's management and Comcast was settled in 2005.
