= Oak Harbor School District =

School district in Washington, United States

Oak Harbor School District 201 is located on the north end of Whidbey Island, serving the town of Oak Harbor, Naval Air Station Whidbey Island (a.k.a. Whidbey Island Station), and surrounding areas in Washington state.

== List of schools ==
=== Elementary ===
- Broadview Elementary
- Crescent Harbor Elementary
- Hillcrest Elementary
- Oak Harbor Elementary
- Olympic View Elementary

=== Middle ===
- Oak Harbor Intermediate School
- North Whidbey Middle School

=== High ===
- Oak Harbor High School

== See also ==
- List of school districts in Washington
