= Charles M. Blow =

American journalist

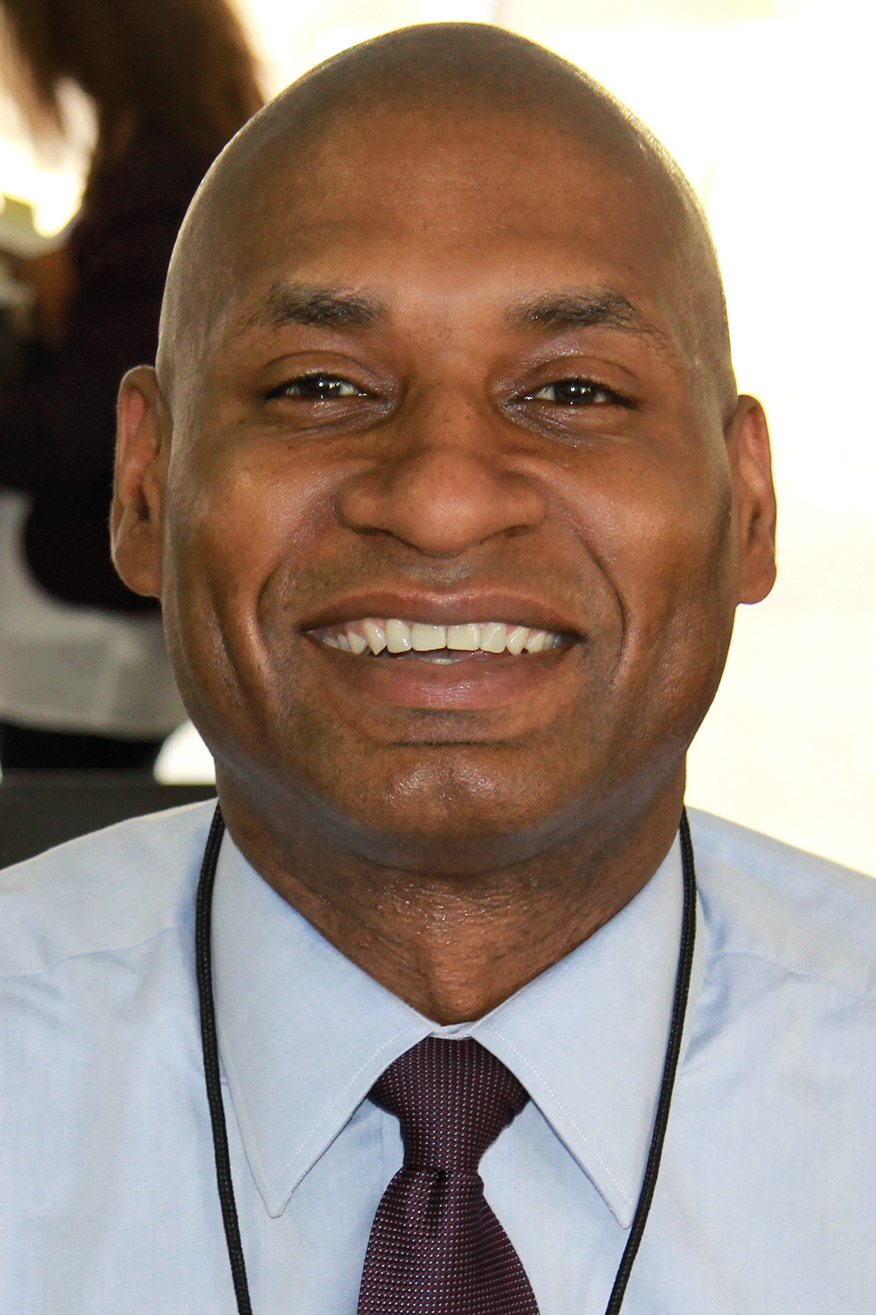
- Blow in 2014
- Born: Charles McRay Blow; August 11, 1970 (age 56); Gibsland, Louisiana, U.S.
- Education: Grambling State University (BA)
- Occupations: Journalist, columnist, writer
- Employers: The New York Times (1994–2025); Black News Channel (2021–2022); MSNBC (2022–2025); Harvard University (2025–present)
- Spouse: Divorced
- Children: 3

Charles McRay Blow (born August 11, 1970) is an American journalist, commentator and former op-ed columnist for The New York Times, news host for Black News Channel and former political analyst for MSNBC. He is currently a Langston Hughes Fellow in the W. E. B. Du Bois Research Institute at Harvard University.

== Early life ==
Blow was born and raised in Gibsland, Louisiana. He was educated at Gibsland–Coleman High School in his hometown, where he founded the school newspaper, and graduated as valedictorian in 1988.

Blow graduated magna cum laude from Grambling State University, with a bachelor's degree in mass communication.

== Career ==
As a student, Blow interned at the Shreveport Times, News Journal, and The New York Times, edited the student newspaper, the Gramblinite, and founded the now-defunct student magazine, Razz. He also served as president of Grambling State's chapter of Kappa Alpha Psi fraternity.

After graduation, he joined The Detroit News as a graphics artist.

Blow joined The New York Times in 1994 as a graphics editor. Eventually, he became the head of the newspaper's graphics department. In 2006, he left to become the art director of National Geographic.

In April 2008, he began writing a column in The New York Times. His column had originally appeared biweekly on Saturdays. In May 2009, it became a weekly feature and appeared twice, weekly, in December 2012. As of May 2021, it appears every Monday and Thursday. On February 5, 2025, Blow wrote his final column for The New York Times Opinion section.

Blow would appear frequently on CNN and MSNBC during this period.

On February 22, 2012, Blow referred to Republican presidential candidate Mitt Romney's "magic underwear", an apparent reference to the Temple Garment, in response to a comment by Romney about two-parent households. The comment was criticized as insensitive to Mormons. In response, Romney joked that "I guess we're finding out for the first time that the media is somewhat biased." Blow later apologized.

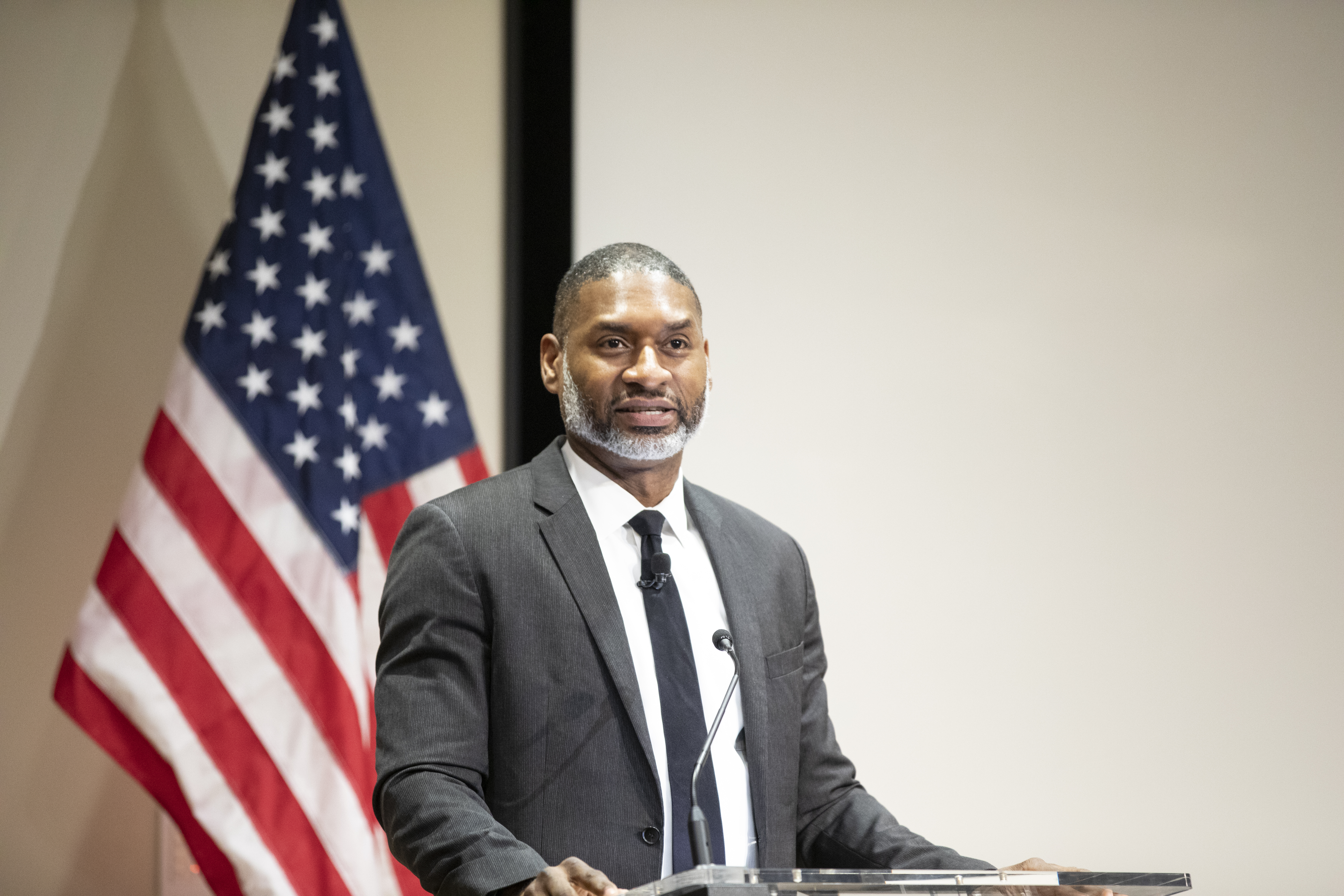
Blow speaking at the University of Texas at Austin in 2017

In 2014, Blow published the book-length memoir entitled Fire Shut Up in my Bones.

In August 2016, while appearing on CNN with Bruce Levell, a delegate for Donald Trump's presidential campaign, Blow called Trump a "bigot" and said that anyone who supported Trump is "a part of the bigotry itself."

In June 2019, Opera Theatre of Saint Louis presented the first performance of an opera adaptation of Blow's memoir Fire Shut Up in My Bones, with music by Grammy Award-winning jazz musician and composer Terence Blanchard. In September 2021, the Metropolitan Opera in New York City opened its 2021–2022 season with that work. This was the Met's first performance of an opera by a Black composer.

In response to the 2020 Central Park birdwatching incident, Blow wrote an op-ed in which he said, "Specifically, I am enraged by White women weaponizing racial anxiety, using their White femininity to activate systems of White terror against Black men. This has long been a power White women realized they had and that they exerted."

In 2021, Blow published The Devil You Know: A Black Manifesto in which he advocates people of color taking direct action by moving to states where they can build a political majority. In April 2021, Blow began hosting Prime with Charles M. Blow, a primetime show on the Black News Channel. It ran until March 2022 when the channel shut down all produced programming.

On March 29, 2022, he joined MSNBC as a political analyst.

In January 2025, Blow announced that he was leaving The New York Times. He was appointed to Harvard University as its inaugural Langston Hughes Fellow in the W. E. B. Du Bois Research Institute, which supports scholars and artists whose work embodies the spirit of Hughes' literary legacy and commitment to social justice.

== Personal life ==
Blow's primary residence is in Atlanta and his secondary residence is in the New York City borough of Brooklyn where he raised his children. His eldest son, Tahj, graduated from Yale University and his twins, Ian and Iman, graduated from Middlebury College and Columbia University respectively.

In 2014, Blow came out publicly as bisexual. He is divorced.

In his autobiography, Fire Shut Up in my Bones, Blow revealed that he was sexually abused as a child by an older cousin.
