= Meeting David Wilson =

Meeting David Wilson is a 2008 American documentary film. It is a 90-minute video produced for initial presentation on the MSNBC cable channel. Its focus is the encounter between David A. Wilson, a black American filmmaker who grew up in Newark, New Jersey, and David B. Wilson, a descendant of a white American tobacco-planter who had owned some of the black Wilsons’ ancestors as slaves. The film was directed by Daniel Woolsey and David A. Wilson and produced by Barion Grant.

The Wilsons and Barion founded an African-American News website at NBC News entitled The Grio.

== Post-premiere discussion ==
The initial cable-TV broadcast was followed by a 90-minute "town hall" discussion recorded at Howard University a week before the broadcast. Brian Williams moderated the event, and the following also participated:

- Cathy L. Lanier
- Michael Dyson
- Kevin Powell
- Mike Barnicle
- Kriss Turner
- DeForest Soaries
- Greg Carr
