= Oak Harbor High School (Washington) =

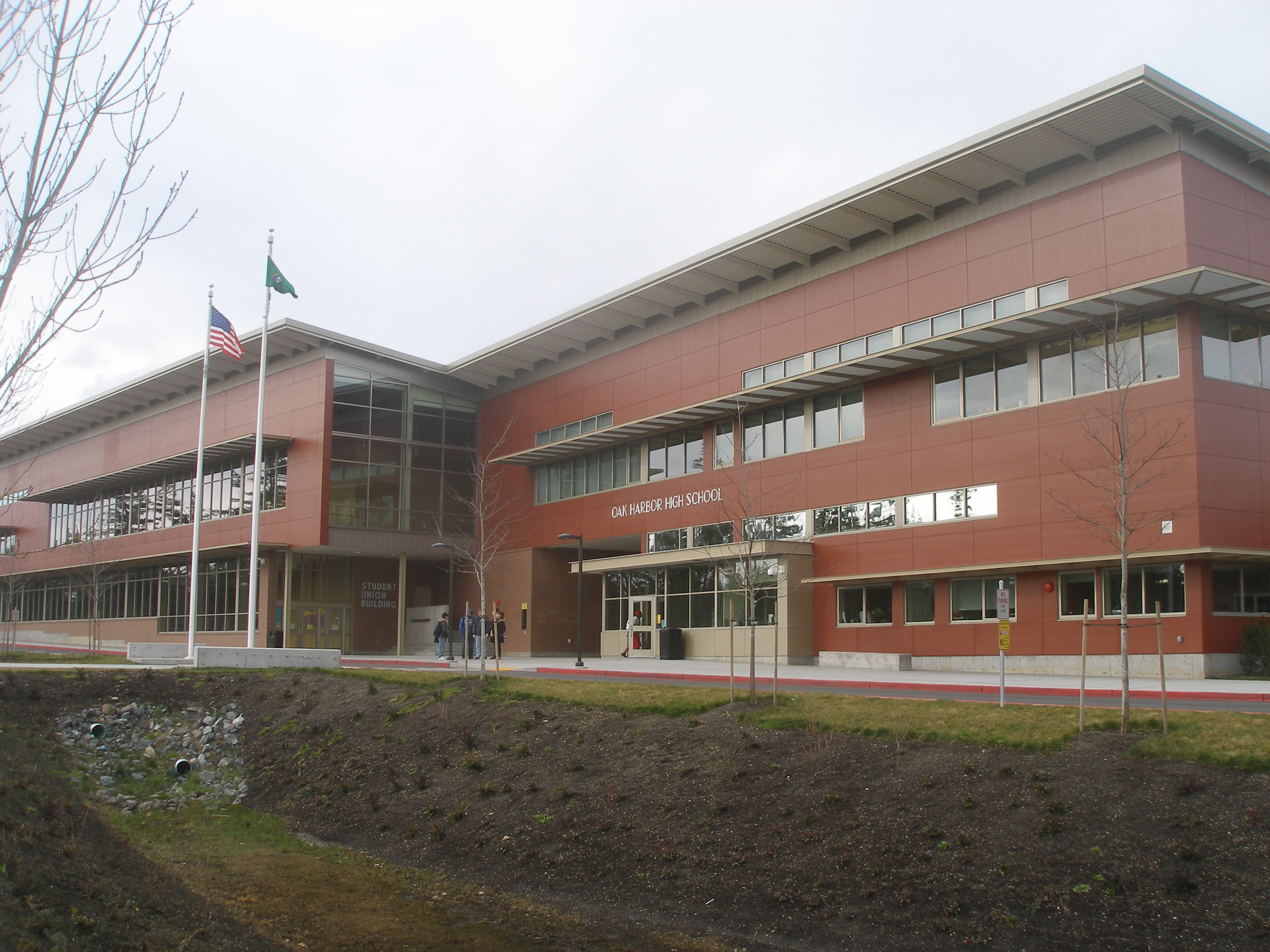

Location
- No. 1 Wildcat Way (Previously 950 NW 2nd Ave.); Oak Harbor, Washington, United States; 48°18′06″N 122°40′07″W

Information
- Type: Public high school
- Established: 1906
- School district: Oak Harbor School District #201
- Principal: Nathan Salisbury
- Staff: 82.83 (FTE)
- Grades: 9-12
- Enrollment: 1,607 (2023-2024)
- Student to teacher ratio: 19.40
- Colors: Purple and gold
- Athletics conference: WESCO 3A/4A (North Division)
- Mascot: Wildcat
- Website: ohhs.ohsd.net

Oak Harbor High School (OHHS) is a public grade 9–12 high school that is located in Oak Harbor, Washington, United States, on Whidbey Island. The school is in the Oak Harbor School District #201. Nathan Salisbury is the Principal. Nathaniel Shepherd and Arnie Otterbeck are the Associate Principals.

== History ==
Oak Harbor's first high school was housed in a building on the waterfront, where the upstairs was used both as a school room and as a community hall for social functions. In the lower story, hay and freight were stored as they came off the steamers of the Puget Sound Mosquito Fleet.

In 1911 a new school was built on property donated by Will Izett, where, until 2006, the old Memorial Stadium stood. The high school students used the basement and lower floor, and the elementary grades were housed on the top floor. Only the basement of this building remains and is now used to house maintenance services.

In 1934 with the aid of WPA labor, a school was built to house secondary students. This brick building (still in use as the North wing of Oak Harbor Elementary School) was a great source of pride to the community and housed high school students until 1956.

In 1956 another new high school was completed and initially contained 330 students in grades 9-12 and an eighteen-member staff. This building (which later was used as Oak Harbor Junior High School and then as North Whidbey Middle School) contained the high school program until June 1974 at which time the enrollment was 975 students in grades 10-12. (This building was demolished in 2006.)

In 1968 planning for the current high school began. It was to be located on a 45-acre (180,000 m^{2}) site near 800 Avenue West (now called NW Second Avenue) and Heller Road. It was built to house 1200 students initially and be expandable to accommodate an enrollment of 1800 student grades 10–12. The facility was built with a brick exterior, steel frame throughout except for the field house dome which consists of laminated wood beams and a wood roof deck. This facility was completed in 1975. In 1991, the school was expanded to include ninth grade, reaching a capacity of 1,700 students.

By 2006 the school was at the end of its planned life, meaning that the infrastructure – plumbing and roof – were considered worn out or outdated to the point of being costly. In addition, the school was not well-suited for modern technology and undersized for the number of students (classrooms were too few and too small, and the hallways were too narrow).

On May 16, 2006, voters approved a plan to modernize the high school. Designed by NAC Architecture, the project was phased and completed in September 2010. The redesigned campus focused on bringing daylight to all classrooms, widening corridors, updating technology and consolidating the school into three buildings.

== School information ==
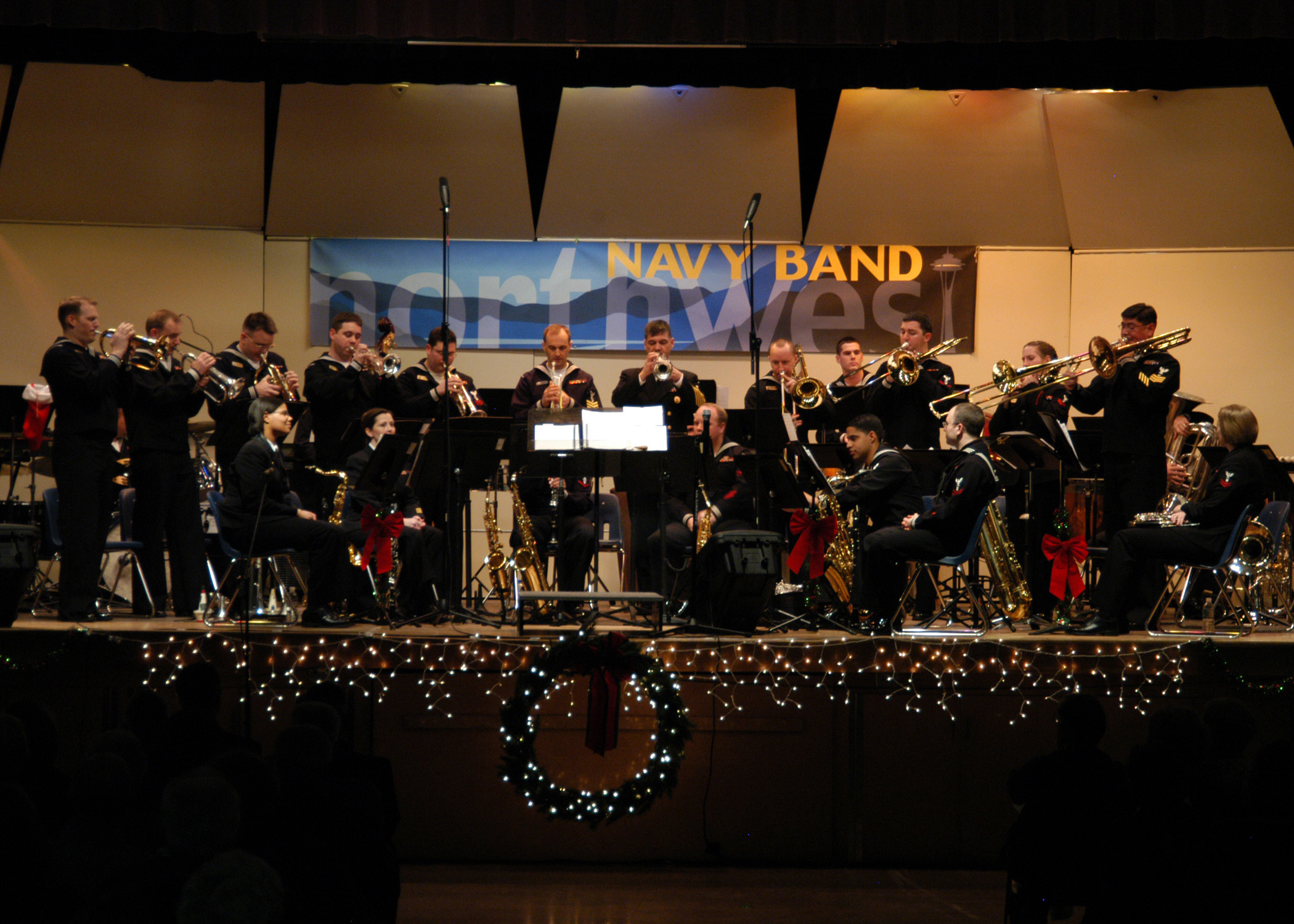
The United States Navy Band Northwest (NBNW) Big Band plays at a concert held in Parker Hall.

The current high school facility, initially constructed during the 1970s, rests on 47 acres (190,000 m^{2}) in northwest Oak Harbor. The school was remodeled with the addition of the Student Union Building and the Career & Tech building opening in 2009.

== Academics ==
Oak Harbor High School offers Advanced Placement courses in Art, Computer Science, Physics, Calculus, Statistics, World History, US History, Government, Biology, Environmental Science, Spanish, Literature and Composition, Language and Composition, and Chemistry.

Foreign languages available are French and Spanish. For those students whose first language is not English, ESL classes are offered.

== Cable channel ==
Available to most Comcast Cable subscribers on Whidbey Island, Wildcat TV (Channel 21) is Oak Harbor High School's student-run Public-access television cable TV channel. Operational since 2005, it features programs ranging in topic from the Island County Fair to Drama Club theatrical performances. Students in Ryan Nowicki’s Wildcat Media class create content for the channel and the school’s YouTube channel.

== Sports ==
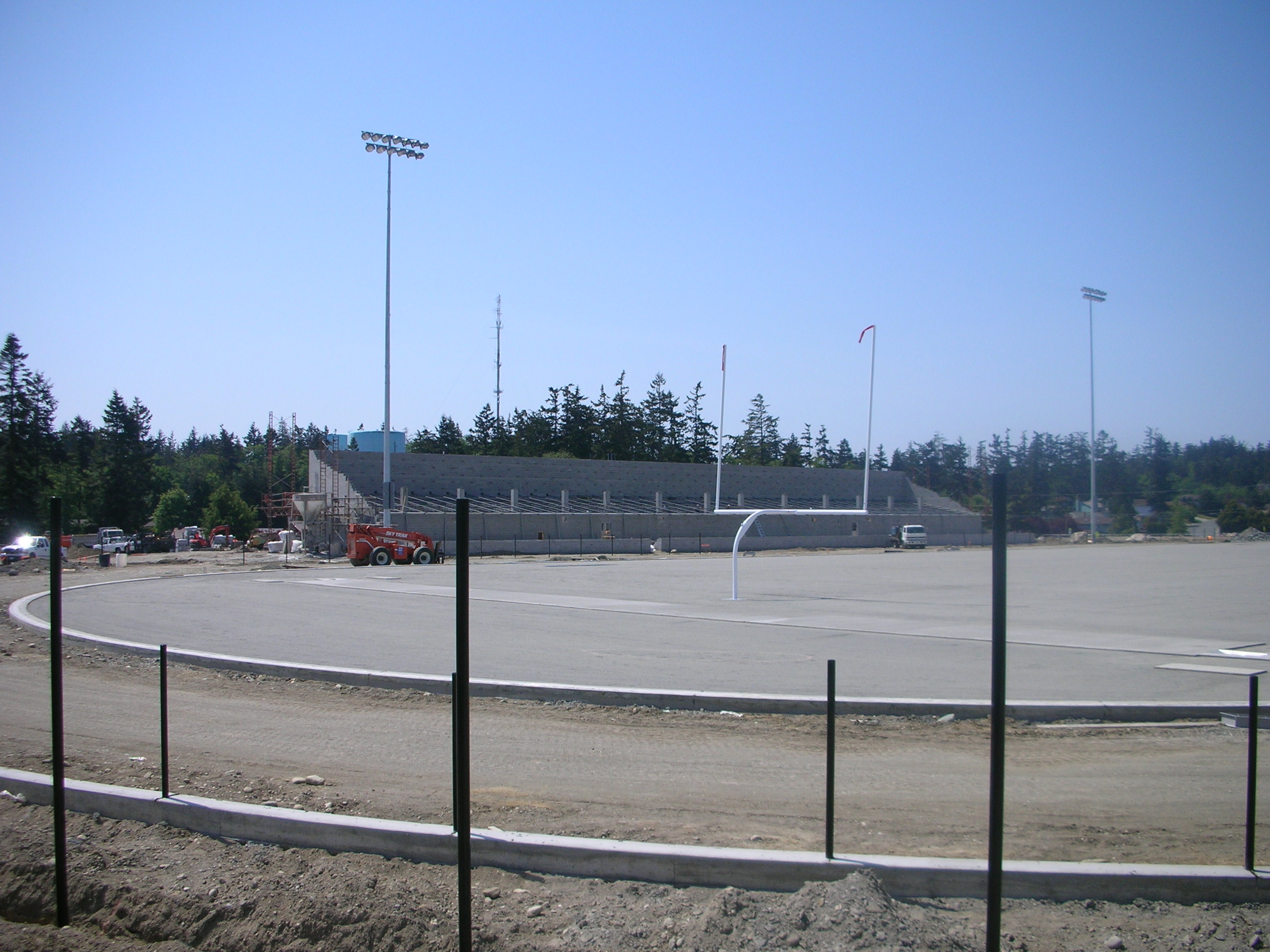
Wildcat Memorial Stadium under construction

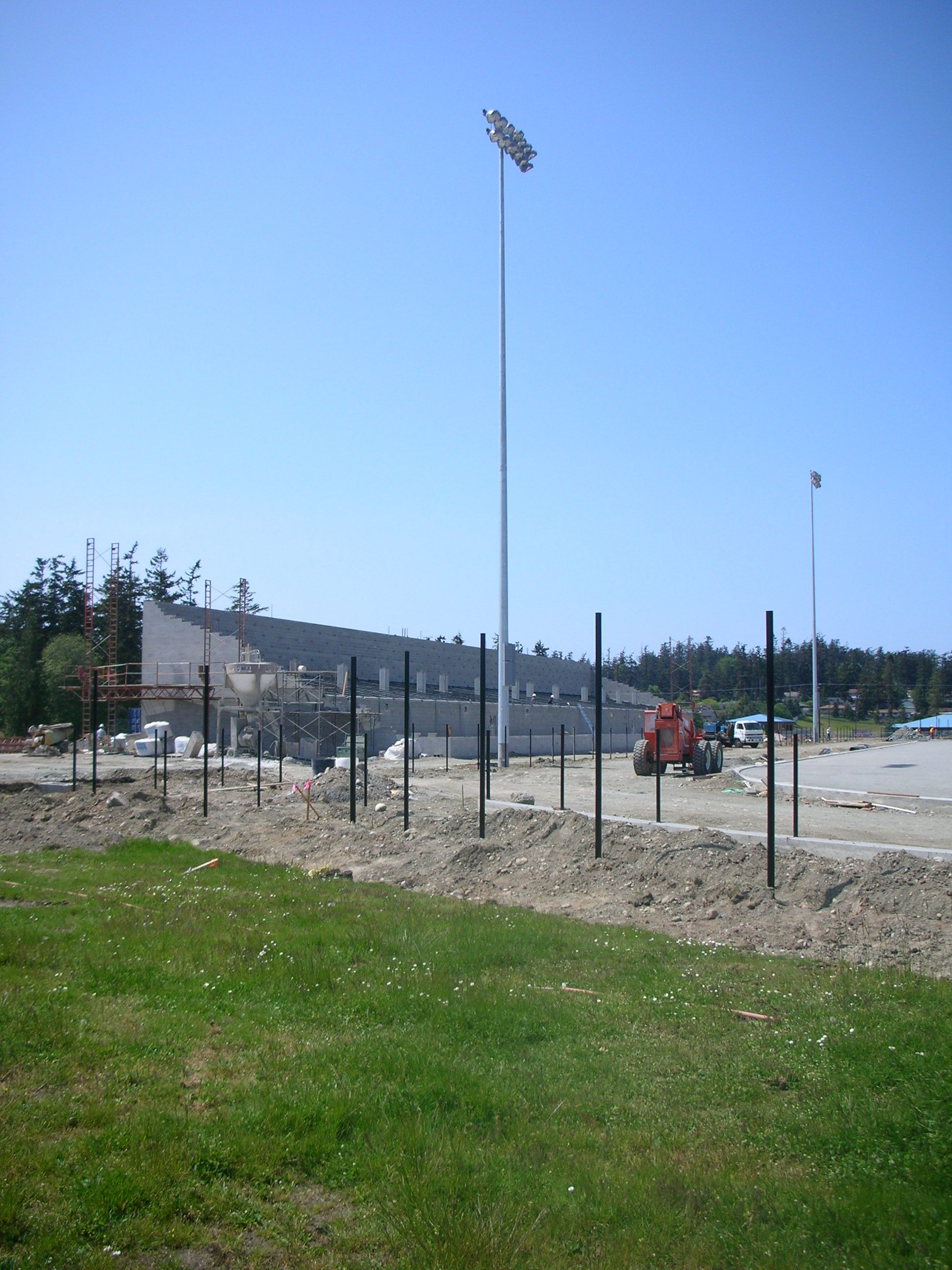
Construction progress in early May

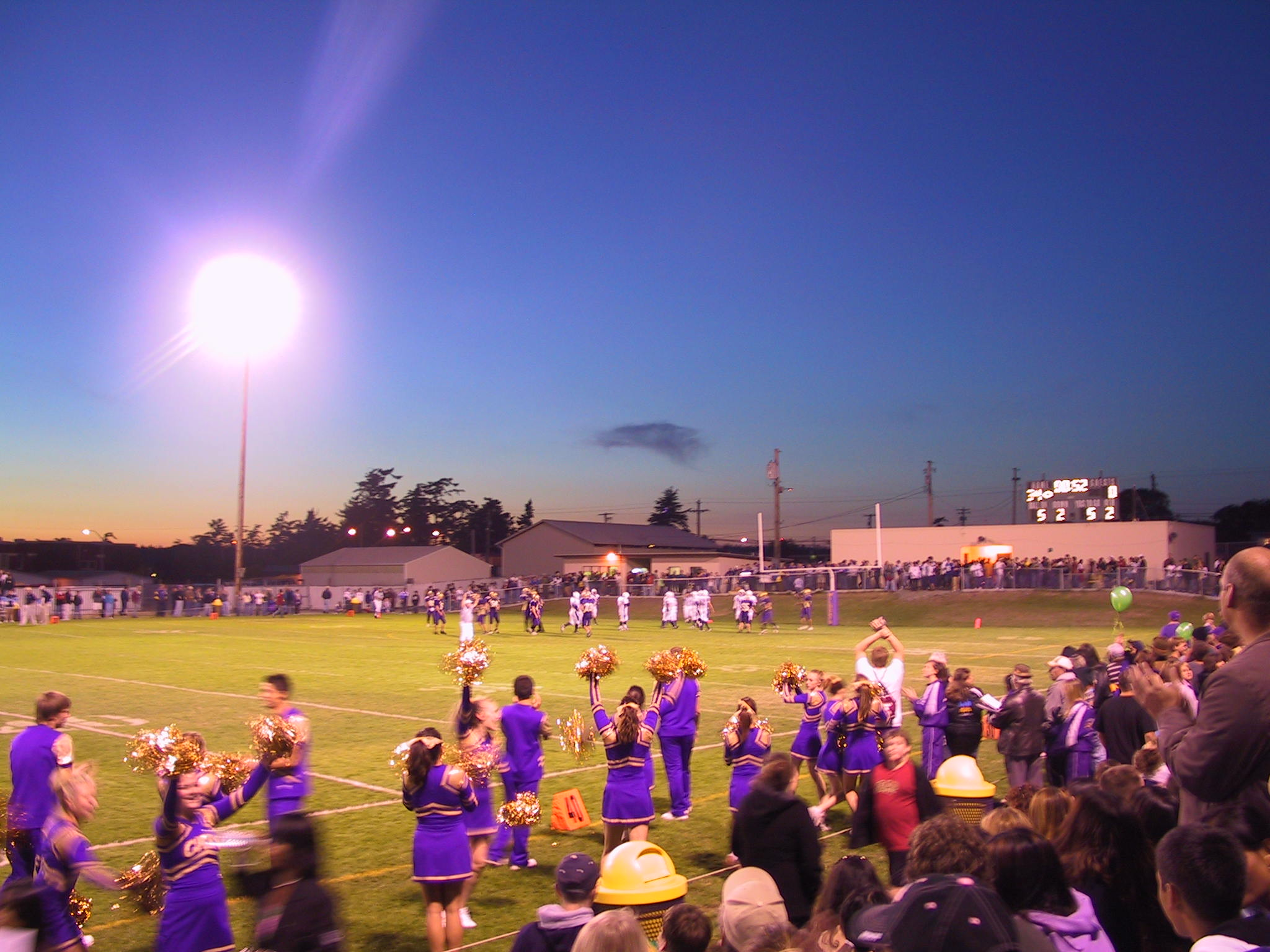
The old Memorial Stadium on Whidbey Avenue

OHHS is a member of the Western Interscholastic Conference and plays within the 3A division.

=== Wildcat Memorial Stadium ===
A new stadium to replace the aged Memorial Stadium was constructed in 2007 on the west end of the OHHS campus. The new stadium, dubbed "Wildcat Memorial Stadium," had its grand opening on September 7, 2007, eight months after construction began in January. The Wildcat Memorial Stadium was built by Ebenal General Contractors of Bellingham. The facility has a covered main grandstand with 2,500 home seats and a smaller covered grandstand with 500 visitor seats. The playing field is a FieldTurf surface and is encircled by a track and field oval. The stadium includes locker rooms, bathrooms, a concession area, and storage space.

The entrance to the stadium has a memorial to veterans of the five branches of the military. The main spire is a pentangle with the seals of the Navy, Army, Air Force, Marines, and Coast Guard mounted on the five sides. At the top, as a tribute to the active Navy personnel stationed at NAS Whidbey, there is a ship's bell. The bell is rung on special occasions and after every Wildcat touchdown. The memorial was designed by Carlos Sierra of Sierra-Martin Architects.

=== Football ===
The football team made it to state in the 2006 season. Playing in the Tacoma Dome, the Wildcats defeated Bothell High School 21-14 to win the Washington Class 4A State Championship.

== Alumni ==
- Angus L. Bowmer, artistic director, founder of the Oregon Shakespeare Festival
- Arcan Cetin, perpetrator of the Cascade Mall shooting
- Robert Lee Yates, serial killer
- Marti Malloy, Team USA Olympic judoka
- Chad Veach, evangelical pastor and founder of Zoe Church
- Tina Orwall, politician
