= Bob Brillante =

American cable TV manager

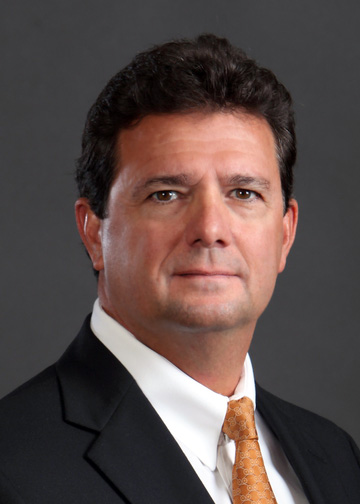
- Born: Robert John Brillante; February 27, 1959 (age 67)

Robert John Brillante (born February 27, 1959) is a cable television manager and executive. A former partner in the now defunct Florida’s News Channel, he was the chief executive officer of the defunct Black News Channel.

== Florida’s News Channel ==
Florida's News Channel used virtual reality news environments with customized local scenery in each of Florida’s seven major television markets. FNC was forced off the air when Comcast canceled all broadcasts "due to lack of viewer interest."

== Black News Channel ==
In 2003, Brillante announced plans to start the Black Television News Channel. Despite a pilot newscast begun in 2003, the network never went on the air until February 10th, 2020, after several postponements. Brillante left the network after only two months to "pursue other opportunities".

== Personal life ==
Brillante is married to Dana Brillante. The couple currently resides in North Florida, maintaining a home in Tallahassee and on St. George Island.
