= TheGrio =

Digital television for African Americans

- Type: Digital broadcast television network
- Country: United States
- Broadcast area: United States
- Headquarters: Beverly Hills, California, U.S.

Programming
- Picture format: 1080i master feed (cable and satellite distribution), reduced to 480i SDTV for most over-the-air affiliates

Ownership
- Owner: Allen Media Group

History
- Launched: December 22, 2016; 9 years ago
- Founder: Mark Burnett; Roma Downey
- Replaced: Black News Channel (after network purchase and merger into TheGrio TV); This TV (after shutdown and merger into TheGrio TV)
- Closed: January 1, 2025; 21 months ago (OTA only)
- Former names: Light TV (2016–2021)

Links
- Website: thegrio.com

TheGrio is a brand name owned by American media company Allen Media Group for a television network and a website aimed at African Americans.

== History ==
TheGrio is to "focus on news and events that have a unique interest and pronounced impact within the national African Americans audience," offering what co-founder and Executive Editor David Wilson feels is "underrepresented in existing national news outlets".

The website's name is derived from the word griot, the term for a West African oral historian and storyteller.

The website originally launched in June 2009 as a division of NBC News. It was founded by the team who created the documentary film Meeting David Wilson. It became a division of MSNBC in 2013. In 2014, it was sold to its founders. In June 2016, Byron Allen's Entertainment Studios acquired the site.

The TV channel was founded as Light TV in 2016 by reality television producer Mark Burnett and his wife, actress Roma Downey, as an inspirational network as part of his chairmanship of MGM Television, which operated the network. It was sold to Entertainment Studios in late 2020, and relaunched as TheGrio TV in January 2021, with a Black-specific programming focus.

After Entertainment Studios purchased the assets of the bankrupt Black News Channel in late July 2022, that network was merged into TheGrio TV on August 1, including the former's existing cable, satellite and advertiser supported on-demand streaming carriage. Allen claimed to want to add more news and commentary to TheGrio TV's schedule. However, the promised content was never really delivered on its own, and consisted mainly of already existing interviews from other AEG shows and archived BNC content. By the 2024 presidential election, news programming had been reduced to the contractual minimum within the BNC contract.

== Television network ==
Light TV and This TV were both sold by MGM TV in October 2020 to the Allen Media Group division of Entertainment Studios. On December 3, 2020, it was announced that the network would be relaunched as TheGrio.TV on January 15, 2021, carrying lifestyle and entertainment programming of interest to the Black American community as an extension of the website.

That same day, Light TV's satellite transponder space was taken over by Entertainment Studios, which stopped carrying programming in the interim and instead transmitted a test pattern promoting the launch of TheGrio (later a looping launch promo), while MGM continued to carry a stream of Light TV through the network's website. Fox Television Stations confirmed its stations would be a part of TheGrio's charter launch group, and much of its affiliate body transferred over through the month-long dark period, though some stations departed for other networks. The network officially relaunched as TheGrio on January 15, 2021, that year's Martin Luther King Jr. Day, and that same day MGM handed over the domain of Light TV to Entertainment Studios, ending the stream of Light TV.

On January 1, 2025, at 5 am EST, TheGrio's digital subchannel distribution ended. The channel remains available on cable providers and FAST channel providers, with the cable version currently carrying a loop of Black sitcoms from the 1970s to the 1990s distributed by Sony Pictures Television, with the FAST channel version on services such as Allen's Local Now carrying past AEG content. Five FTS-owned stations replaced it with what is now Roar several weeks later.

== Programming ==
From 2016 until 2021, TheGrio TV (as Light TV) featured several series and movies meant to fit the network's family-oriented approach, including content from the MGM film and TV library or acquired through outside sources. Infomercials were added to the Light TV lineup in 2019, occupying all of the overnight hours and into the early morning.

=== Light TV (2015–2021) ===
The then-new over-the-top (OTT) faith-based channel was under development as early as September 2014 when MGM purchased 55% of One Three Media and LightWorkers Media, owned by Hearst Entertainment, Mark Burnett and Roma Downey, and consolidated them into United Artists Media Group. With MGM purchasing Hearst and Burnett and Downey's shares in UAMG, the channel was still a planned streaming service. However, Hearst and Burnett and Downey retained their stakes in the channel.

MGM announced the formation of Light TV on December 15, 2015, with a launch planned for December on thirteen major market stations owned by Fox Television Stations. The network launched on January 20, 2016 with two stations, and the rest of the group's stations.

The network was intended to carry new and original content from LightWorkers as part of Burnett's chairmanship of MGM's television division, but never ended up carrying any new content, only featuring rerun and library content already seen on MGM's This TV (a film-oriented network) and MGM HD, along with low-cost barter programming such as Heartland, which was already in wide syndication across multiple channels, and other generic inspirational or family-friendly content. By 2019, the network added paid programming which made up its late night and early morning schedule, reducing its programming commitment further.

=== Current programming ===
Below is a current list of programming broadcast on TheGrio:

- America's Court with Judge Ross (November 1, 2021)
- Animal Rescue
- Comics Unleashed (November 1, 2021)
- Equal Justice with Judge Eboni K. Williams
- Funny You Should Ask
- HBCU GO sports – coverage of college athletics at historically black colleges and universities, especially college football and the bands of those teams
- Justice for All with Judge Christina Perez
- Justice with Judge Mablean (November 1, 2021)
- Masters of the Game
- Supreme Justice with Judge Karen Mills (November 1, 2021)
- The Verdict with Judge Hatchett (November 1, 2021)
- We the People with Judge Lauren Lake
- Wild Times at the San Diego Zoo

==== Former programming ====
- The First Family
- Jeremiah
- Mr. Box Office
- TheGrio News with Eboni K. Williams
- TheGrio News with Marc Lamont Hill

Light TV

- The Adventures of Paddington Bear (2016–2019)
- All Dogs Go to Heaven: The Series (December 22, 2016 – September 29, 2019)
- Are You Smarter than a 5th Grader? (2016–2019, 2020–January 14, 2021)
- The Busy World of Richard Scarry (December 22, 2016 – October 2, 2020)
- The Country Mouse and the City Mouse Adventures (December 22, 2016 – October 2, 2020)
- Flipper
- Flipper – The New Adventures
- Franny's Feet (2017–September 30, 2019)
- Green Acres (2016–2018; October 1, 2019 – January 14, 2021)
- Heartland
- Heathcliff (October 6, 2018 – September 30, 2019)
- Highway to Heaven (December 22, 2016 – January 14, 2021)
- Inspector Gadget (December 22, 2016 – October 5, 2018 & October 1, 2019 – April 2020)
- It's About Time (October 5, 2019 – January 14, 2021)
- Madeline (December 22, 2016 – September 30, 2019)
- Mister Ed
- My Mother the Car (October 5, 2019 – January 14, 2021)
- Naturally, Sadie (October 1, 2019 – April 2020)
- The Patty Duke Show (September 3, 2018 – January 14, 2021)
- The Pink Panther Show (December 24, 2016 – September 29, 2019)
- Sea Hunt
- Wimzie's House (December 22, 2016 – September 30, 2019)
