= Black News Channel =

American television news channel

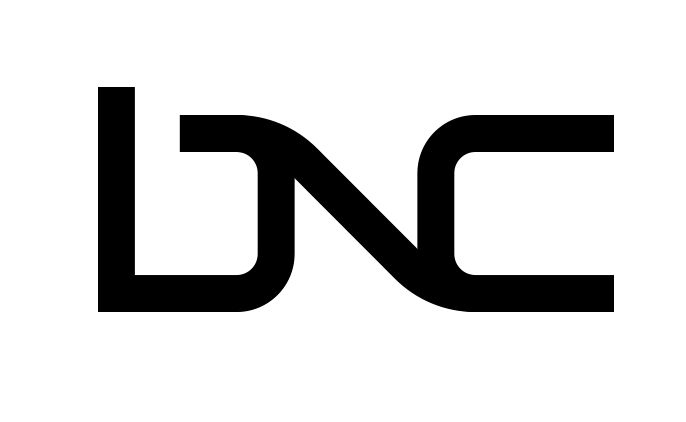
- Country: United States
- Broadcast area: United States
- Headquarters: Tallahassee, Florida

Programming
- Language: English

Ownership
- Owner: Allen Media Group (final owner)
- Key people: J. C. Watts (chairman of student affairs); Shahid Khan (investor)

History
- Launched: February 10, 2020; 6 years ago
- Founder: Bob Brillante; J. C. Watts
- Closed: August 1, 2022; 4 years ago (2 years, 5 months and 22 days)
- Replaced by: Merged into TheGrio

Links
- Website: bnc.tv

The Black News Channel (BNC) was an American pay television news channel, targeting the African American demographic. The channel was based in Tallahassee, Florida, and launched on February 10, 2020. The station was co-founded by television executive Bob Brillante and former congressman J. C. Watts, who was also the network's chairman.

The network filed for bankruptcy in March 2022 and was subsequently purchased by Byron Allen's Entertainment Studios. Upon the sale's completion on August 1, 2022, BNC was merged into TheGrio TV, an already-existing over-the-air network owned by Entertainment Studios, which will add news and commentary into that network's existing schedule.

== History ==
J. C. Watts had planned to launch a news network focusing specifically on black American cultural topics since the mid-2000s, and had several rounds of unsuccessful capital-raising in developing the project. In the mid-2010s, a partnership with Florida A&M’s School of Journalism & Graphic Communication was announced, and the station was slated to be housed there. The channel eventually launched independently of the school, in a building on Killearn Center Boulevard in Tallahassee.

The launch of the network was announced in November 2018 for 2019. The launch date was pushed from November 15, 2019 to January 6, 2020 before being pushed again to its eventual launch date, February 10, 2020. One of the chief investors in the network is Jacksonville Jaguars owner Shahid Khan. In July 2020, former CNN executive Princell Hair was named president and CEO of Black News Channel. In March 2021, BNC reached an agreement with CBS Media Ventures to handle advertising sales. That same month, BNC launched a revamp of its prime time lineup; progressive black commentators were added to the lineup (in contrast to its chairman Watts, who is a prominent conservative Republican).

Between December 2021 and March 2022, over 120 members of the network's staff were either dismissed or voluntarily departed from BNC. During the network’s first two years of operation, Black News Channel suffered persistently low viewership; according to Nielsen estimates, in 2021, the network ranked 123rd out of 124 cable-originated television networks in total average viewership, with an average of 4,000 viewers per-program.

On January 5, 2022, thirteen current and former female employees filed a class action gender discrimination lawsuit against BNC in the U.S. District Court for the Northern District of Illinois, accusing network management of paying female employees significantly lower salaries compared to male staffers, harboring a misogynistic work environment in which female staffers felt forced to conform to behavioral gender stereotypes, and retaliating against employees who formally lodged complaints about the pay disparities and personal treatment. (Two of the plaintiffs involved in the amended lawsuit had previously filed a separate complaint against BNC in August 2021.) In response, BNC sent out a memo to their current employees informing them of the network's intent to file a motion for dismissal of the lawsuit.

=== Bankruptcy ===
On March 25, 2022, it was reported that the channel would be shutting down imminently after Khan withdrew his funding following a failed attempt to sell the network. Live programming was discontinued at 5:00 p.m. Eastern Time that afternoon, with the remainder of that day's schedule being filled with taped programming, mainly involving the Supreme Court confirmation hearing of Ketanji Brown Jackson. As of March 26, BNC remained operational, carrying various other programs and films it has the rights to.

On March 28, the network filed for Chapter 11 bankruptcy protection with the U.S. Bankruptcy Court for the Northern District of Florida. On May 9, Black News Channel resumed live programming, adding three hours of live news and commentary programs each weekday from 10:00 a.m. to 1:00 p.m. Eastern Time.

=== Asset purchase by Entertainment Studios, merger into TheGrio TV ===
On July 20, 2022, Byron Allen's Allen Media Group received approval from the Tallahassee-based U.S. Bankruptcy Court district to acquire Black News Channel from Khan for $11 million. The network's existing carriage was then merged into Allen's over-the-air network TheGrio, which occurred on August 1, 2022. Allen plans to add more news and commentary into TheGrio's schedule as part of the retransmission consent stipulations made in BNC's carriage contracts.

In December 2022, Black News Channel converted their Chapter 11 case to a Chapter 7 bankruptcy liquidation.

== Carriage ==
Charter Spectrum, Comcast Xfinity, DirecTV and Verizon Fios carried the channel's linear feed, while Dish Network carried it both as the network itself and as a video-on-demand service. In March 2021, BNC was available in 52 million homes, compared to over 83 million for the major cable news outlets and 75 million for conservative news network Newsmax TV.

== Former on-air personalities ==
- Laverne McGee - News Anchor
- Mike Hill - Start Your Day (6 A.M. - 10 A.M.)
- Marc Lamont Hill - Black News Tonight (8 P.M.)
- Charles Blow - Prime (10 P.M.)
- Kelly Wright - The World Tonight (5 P.M. - 7 P.M.)
