= Hillsong NYC =

Church in Manhattan, New York

Hillsong NYC or Hillsong Church NYC is a Manhattan-based Christian church that is part of Hillsong Church based in Australia.

== History ==
It was officially launched on October 17, 2010. It started meeting at Irving Plaza near Union Square.

Joel Houston, the eldest son of Global Senior Pastors Brian Houston and Bobbie Houston, was involved in the development of the church location. The church was thrown into the spotlight with the November 2020 firing of former pastor Carl Lentz relating to infidelity and other areas of misconduct.

The annual Hillsong Conference was held for the first time in New York in 2013, and annually since, using Barclays Center in Brooklyn, with a seating capacity of 17,000.

In February 2021, pastors Chrishan Jeyaratnam and Danielle Jeyaratnam were announced as the incoming new lead pastors, moving from their previous role as Western Australian state oversight, based in Perth.
