= Carl Lentz =

Former American pastor

- Born: Stephen Carl Lentz; November 6, 1978 (age 47); Williamsburg, Virginia, US
- Education: North Carolina State University (1998–2000); Hillsong International Leadership College
- Spouse: Laura Lentz (m. 2003)
- Children: 3
- Religion: Christian
- Offices held: Former Lead Pastor of Hillsong Church, New York City

Stephen Carl Lentz (born November 6, 1978) is an American podcaster and former pastor who was also a spiritual advisor to celebrities such as Justin Bieber. He was the lead pastor of Hillsong NYC until November 4, 2020, when he was fired by Hillsong Global Pastor Brian Houston for "leadership issues and breaches of trust, plus a recent revelation of moral failures."

== Early life and education ==
Carl Lentz was born in Williamsburg, Virginia. From 1998 to 2000, he attended North Carolina State University and was a walk-on basketball player on the school's men's basketball team. He studied at Hillsong International Leadership College in Sydney, Australia. It was during his studies, at the age of 20, that he and Joel Houston, Hillsong founder Brian Houston's son, had the idea to plant a campus of Hillsong Church in New York City.

== Ministry ==
In 2010, Lentz co-founded Hillsong NYC in New York City. His appearance, particularly his tattoos, hair style, clothing, and footwear, started a radically different trend amongst younger pastors.

Lentz baptized Justin Bieber, was present at the baptism of Kevin Durant, and has befriended various other well-known people.

On October 30, 2017, while on The View, Lentz was asked if he believed abortion was a sin; he did not answer the question directly, instead saying that "the cultural, religious norm right now is that if you and I disagree, we're done. I don't believe that's the case." Eight days later, Lentz released a statement via Twitter saying "I do believe abortion is sinful." In January 2019, he called the passage of the Reproductive Health Act in the State of New York, which allows abortion after 24 weeks when a fetus is unviable or the pregnancy poses a risk to the mother's health, "evil, shameful and demonic".

Lentz appeared on Oprah's SuperSoul Sunday, which caused some to question Lentz's theology, since he said one could have a relationship with God outside of Jesus.

Lentz was hired on staff for a non-pastoral position at Transformation Church in Oklahoma in March 2023.

Since 2024, Lentz has maintained a podcast titled Lights On, which he initially used to address his scandals that led to his dismissal from Hillsong Church, as well as his subsequent journey to repentance.

== Scandals ==
=== Affair and dismissal ===
On November 4, 2020, Brian Houston, Global Senior Pastor of Hillsong announced through a church newsletter that he had fired Lentz. The reason for Lentz's removal was cited as "leadership issues and breaches of trust, plus a recent revelation of moral failures." Lentz acknowledged that he had engaged in an adulterous affair. His wife's employment with the church was also terminated despite her own conduct not being an issue.

=== Further allegations ===
On May 31, 2021, Leona Kimes, wife of Hillsong Boston pastor Josh Kimes, accused Lentz of "manipulation, control, bullying, abuse of power, and sexual abuse" toward her. She worked as the Lentz family nanny and alleged that the assaults happened from 2011 to 2017. In the 2023 FX documentary The Secrets of Hillsong, Lentz admitted to an Adderall addiction and to having an extramarital affair with Kimes.

== Published works ==
- Own the Moment (Simon & Schuster, 2017) ISBN 1501177001
