= List of county courthouses in Alabama =

This is a list of county courthouses in Alabama. Each of Alabama's 67 counties has a courthouse in the county seat. Barbour, Coffee, Jefferson, Marshall and St. Clair counties have two courthouses each.

Listed individually on the National Register of Historic Places
Listed on the National Register of Historic Places as part of a Historic District

Courthouse	Image	Location	Built	Notes
Autauga County Courthouse		Prattville, Autauga County; 32°27′48″N 86°28′29″W	1906	Part of the Daniel Pratt Historic District (NRHP).
Baldwin County Courthouse		Bay Minette, Baldwin County; 30°53′0″N 87°46′27″W	1901 (renovated 1996)	
Barbour County Courthouse (Clayton)		Clayton, Barbour County; 31°52′41″N 85°27′0″W	1961	
Barbour County Courthouse (Eufaula)		Eufaula, Barbour County; 31°53′34″N 85°8′30″W	1910s	Part of the Seth Lore and Irwinton Historic District (NRHP).
Bibb County Courthouse		Centreville, Bibb County; 32°56′44″N 87°8′8″W	1902	Part of the Centreville Historic District (NRHP).
Blount County Courthouse		Oneonta, Blount County; 33°56′47″N 86°28′33″W	1954	
Bullock County Courthouse		Union Springs, Bullock County; 33°56′47″N 86°28′33″W	1872	Part of the Bullock County Courthouse Historic District (NRHP).
Butler County Courthouse		Greenville, Butler County; 31°49′47″N 86°37′5″W	1871	Part of the East Commerce Street Historic District (NRHP).
Calhoun County Courthouse		Anniston, Calhoun County; 33°39′31″N 85°49′52″W	1900	Listed on the National Register of Historic Places.
Chambers County Courthouse		LaFayette, Chambers County; 32°53′58″N 85°24′3″W	1899	Part of the Chambers County Courthouse Square Historic District (NRHP).
Cherokee County Courthouse		Centre, Cherokee County; 34°9′9″N 85°40′44″W	1936	
Chilton County Courthouse		Clanton, Chilton County; 32°50′24″N 86°37′47″W	1960	
Choctaw County Courthouse		Butler, Choctaw County; 32°5′22″N 88°13′19″W	1907	
Clarke County Courthouse		Grove Hill, Clarke County; 31°42′31″N 87°46′43″W	1955	Part of the Grove Hill Courthouse Square Historic District (NRHP).
Clay County Courthouse		Ashland, Clay County; 33°16′27″N 85°50′9″W	1906	Listed on the National Register of Historic Places.
Cleburne County Courthouse		Heflin, Cleburne County; 33°38′59″N 85°35′17″W	1907	Listed on the National Register of Historic Places.
Coffee County Courthouse (Elba)		Elba, Coffee County; 31°24′51″N 86°3′56″W	1903	Listed on the National Register of Historic Places.
Coffee County Courthouse (Enterprise)		Enterprise, Coffee County; 31°18′56″N 85°51′8″W	1998	
Colbert County Courthouse		Tuscumbia, Colbert County; 34°44′1″N 87°42′14″W	1882 (renovated 1909)	Part of the Colbert County Courthouse Square Historic District (NRHP).
Conecuh County Government Center		Evergreen, Conecuh County; 31°26′7″N 86°57′17″W	2006	
Coosa County Courthouse		Rockford, Coosa County; 32°53′22″N 86°13′11″W	1970	
Covington County Courthouse		Andalusia, Covington County; 31°18′31″N 86°28′57″W	1916	Listed on the National Register of Historic Places.
Crenshaw County Courthouse		Luverne, Crenshaw County; 31°42′57″N 86°15′45″W	1955	Included in Luverne Historic District as a non-contributing resource.
Cullman County Courthouse		Cullman, Cullman County; 34°10′21″N 86°50′30″W	1966	
Dale County Courthouse		Ozark, Dale County; 31°27′31″N 85°38′26″W	1968	
Dallas County Courthouse		Selma, Dallas County; 32°24′27″N 87°1′17″W	1960	
DeKalb County Courthouse		Fort Payne, DeKalb County; 34°26′24″N 85°43′32″W	1955 (remodeled 1974, 1999)	
Elmore County Courthouse		Wetumpka, Elmore County; 32°32′12″N 86°12′18″W	1932	Part of the East Wetumpka Commercial District (NRHP).
Escambia County Courthouse		Brewton, Escambia County; 31°6′24″N 87°4′16″W	1960	
Etowah County Courthouse		Gadsden, Etowah County; 34°0′56″N 86°0′44″W	1949 (renovated 2000)	
Fayette County Courthouse		Fayette, Fayette County; 33°41′6″N 87°49′54″W	1911	Part of the Fayette County Courthouse District (NRHP).
Franklin County Courthouse		Russellville, Franklin County; 34°30′29″N 87°43′42″W	1955	
Geneva County Courthouse		Geneva, Geneva County; 31°2′26″N 85°51′56″W		
Greene County Courthouse		Eutaw, Greene County; 32°50′29″N 87°53′12″W	1993	
Hale County Courthouse		Greensboro, Hale County; 32°42′14″N 87°35′33″W	1907	Part of the Greensboro Historic District (NRHP).
Henry County Courthouse		Abbeville, Henry County; 31°34′16″N 85°14′59″W	1966	
Houston County Courthouse		Dothan, Houston County; 31°13′27″N 85°23′35″W	1962 (renovated 2003)	
Jackson County Courthouse		Scottsboro, Jackson County; 34°40′20″N 86°2′2″W	1912	Part of the Public Square Historic District (NRHP).
Jefferson County Courthouse (Bessemer)		Bessemer, Jefferson County; 33°24′5″N 86°57′14″W	2009	
Jefferson County Courthouse (Birmingham)		Birmingham, Jefferson County; 33°31′17″N 86°48′32″W	1931	Listed on the National Register of Historic Places.
Lamar County Courthouse		Vernon, Lamar County; 33°45′27″N 88°6′31″W	1909 (remodeled 1948)	
Lauderdale County Courthouse		Florence, Lauderdale County; 34°47′56″N 87°40′32″W	1965	
Lawrence County Courthouse		Moulton, Lawrence County; 34°28′52″N 87°17′31″W	1936	Part of the Moulton Courthouse Square Historic District (NRHP).
Lee County Courthouse		Opelika, Lee County; 32°38′45″N 85°22′45″W	1896	Listed on the National Register of Historic Places.
Limestone County Courthouse		Athens, Limestone County; 34°48′10″N 86°58′18″W	1919	Part of the Athens Courthouse Square Historic District (NRHP).
Lowndes County Courthouse		Hayneville, Lowndes County; 32°11′2″N 86°34′47″W	1858 (enlarged 1905)	Listed on the National Register of Historic Places.
Macon County Courthouse		Tuskegee, Macon County; 32°25′30″N 85°41′28″W	1905	Listed on the National Register of Historic Places.
Madison County Courthouse		Huntsville, Madison County; 34°43′49″N 86°35′6″W	1966	
Marengo County Courthouse		Linden, Marengo County; 32°18′24″N 87°47′51″W	1966	This is the fifth courthouse for the county, built on the same site as a Victorian-era courthouse that burned in 1965. The third Marengo County courthouse, built in 1850, still stands and is listed on the National Register of Historic Places.
Marion County Courthouse		Hamilton, Marion County; 34°8′31″N 87°59′21″W	1970	
Marshall County Courthouse (Albertville)		Albertville, Marshall County; 34°16′5″N 86°12′37″W	1935	
Marshall County Courthouse (Guntersville)		Guntersville, Marshall County; 34°21′31″N 86°17′36″W	1935 (remodeled 1963)	
Mobile County Courthouse		Mobile, Mobile County; 30°41′20″N 88°2′33″W	1994	
Monroe County Courthouse		Monroeville, Monroe County; 31°31′38″N 87°19′28″W	1963	
Montgomery County Courthouse		Montgomery, Montgomery County; 32°22′28″N 86°18′20″W		
Morgan County Courthouse		Decatur, Morgan County; 34°36′25″N 86°59′5″W	1975	
Perry County Courthouse		Marion, Perry County; 32°37′58″N 87°19′7″W	1856	Part of the Marion Courthouse Square Historic District (NRHP).
Pickens County Courthouse		Carrollton, Pickens County; 33°15′42″N 88°5′42″W	1877 (restored 2007)	Listed on the National Register of Historic Places.
Pike County Courthouse		Troy, Pike County; 31°48′26″N 85°58′25″W	1952	
Randolph County Courthouse		Wedowee, Randolph County; 33°18′33″N 85°29′3″W	1985	
Russell County Courthouse		Phenix City, Russell County; 32°28′21″N 84°59′59″W	1938	
St. Clair County Courthouse (Ashville)		Ashville, St. Clair County; 33°50′13″N 86°15′18″W	1844	Part of the Ashville Historic District (NRHP).
St. Clair County Courthouse (Pell City)		Pell City, St. Clair County; 33°35′12″N 86°17′12″W	2001	
Shelby County Courthouse		Columbiana, Shelby County; 33°10′44″N 86°36′27″W	1908	Replaced the Old Shelby County Courthouse
Sumter County Courthouse		Livingston, Sumter County; 32°34′58″N 88°11′18″W	1902	Listed on the National Register of Historic Places.
Talladega County Courthouse		Talladega, Talladega County; 33°26′6″N 86°6′10″W	1838 (redesigned 1925, restored 1977)	Built from 1836 to 1838, it was originally a three-story structure, later reduced to two stories with a clock tower. Additions were made in 1882 and 1905. It suffered extensive fire damage in 1925 and was redesigned, utilizing some of the original architectural elements. Part of the Talladega Courthouse Square Historic District (NRHP).
Tallapoosa County Courthouse		Dadeville, Tallapoosa County; 32°49′52″N 85°45′51″W	1962	
Tuscaloosa County Courthouse		Tuscaloosa, Tuscaloosa County; 33°12′26″N 87°34′4″W	1964	
Walker County Courthouse		Jasper, Walker County; 33°49′59″N 87°16′38″W	1933	Part of the Jasper Downtown Historic District (NRHP).
Washington County Courthouse		Chatom, Washington County; 31°27′56″N 88°15′24″W	1964	
Wilcox County Courthouse		Camden, Wilcox County; 31°59′29″N 87°17′21″W	1857	Part of the Wilcox County Courthouse Historic District (NRHP).
Winston County Courthouse		Double Springs, Winston County; 34°8′48″N 87°24′8″W	1929	Listed on the National Register of Historic Places.

== See also ==
- List of United States federal courthouses in Alabama
