= Coffee County Courthouse =

Coffee County Courthouse may refer to:

- Coffee County Courthouse (Elba, Alabama)
- Coffee County Courthouse (Enterprise, Alabama)
- Coffee County Courthouse (Tennessee), Manchester, Tennessee
