= Lee County Courthouse =

Lee County Courthouse may refer to:

- Lee County Courthouse (Alabama), Opelika, Alabama
- Lee County Courthouse (Arkansas), Marianna, Arkansas
- Old Lee County Courthouse, Fort Myers, Florida
- Lee County Courthouse (Georgia), Leesburg, Georgia
- Lee County Courthouse (Illinois), Dixon, Illinois
- Lee County Courthouse (Fort Madison, Iowa)
- Lee County Courthouse (Keokuk, Iowa)
- Lee County Courthouse (Mississippi), Tupelo, Mississippi, listed on the National Register of Historic Places
- Lee County Courthouse (North Carolina), Sanford, North Carolina
- Lee County Courthouse (South Carolina), Bishopville, South Carolina
- Lee County Courthouse (Texas), Giddings, Texas

== See also ==
- Lea County Courthouse
