= Elmore County Courthouse =

Elmore County Courthouse may refer to:

- Elmore County Courthouse (Alabama), Wetumpka, Alabama
- Elmore County Courthouse (Idaho), Mountain Home, Idaho

== See also ==
- Elmore County (disambiguation)
