= Elmore County =

Elmore County is the name of two counties in the United States:

- Elmore County, Alabama
- Elmore County, Idaho

== See also ==
- Elmore County Courthouse (disambiguation)
