= Bullock County Courthouse Historic District =

- U.S. National Register of Historic Places
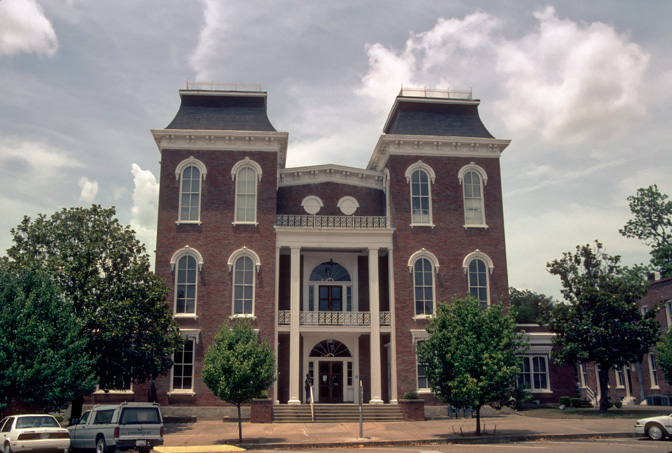

- Location within Alabama Location within the United States
- Interactive map showing the location of Bullock County Courthouse Historic District
- Location: N. Prairie St., Union Springs, Alabama
- Coordinates: 32°08′43″N 85°42′59″W
- Area: 25.1 acres (10.2 ha)
- Architectural style: Gothic
- NRHP reference No.: 76000312
- Added to NRHP: October 8, 1976

The Bullock County Courthouse Historic District is a 25.1 acres (10.2 ha) historic district in Union Springs, Alabama, United States, which was listed on the National Register of Historic Places in 1976.

It includes the Bullock County Courthouse, a city hall, a Carnegie library, and a First Baptist Church among its 46 contributing buildings.

The courthouse, built in 1871, is Second Empire in style.
