= Coffee County Courthouse (Tennessee) =

- U.S. National Register of Historic Places
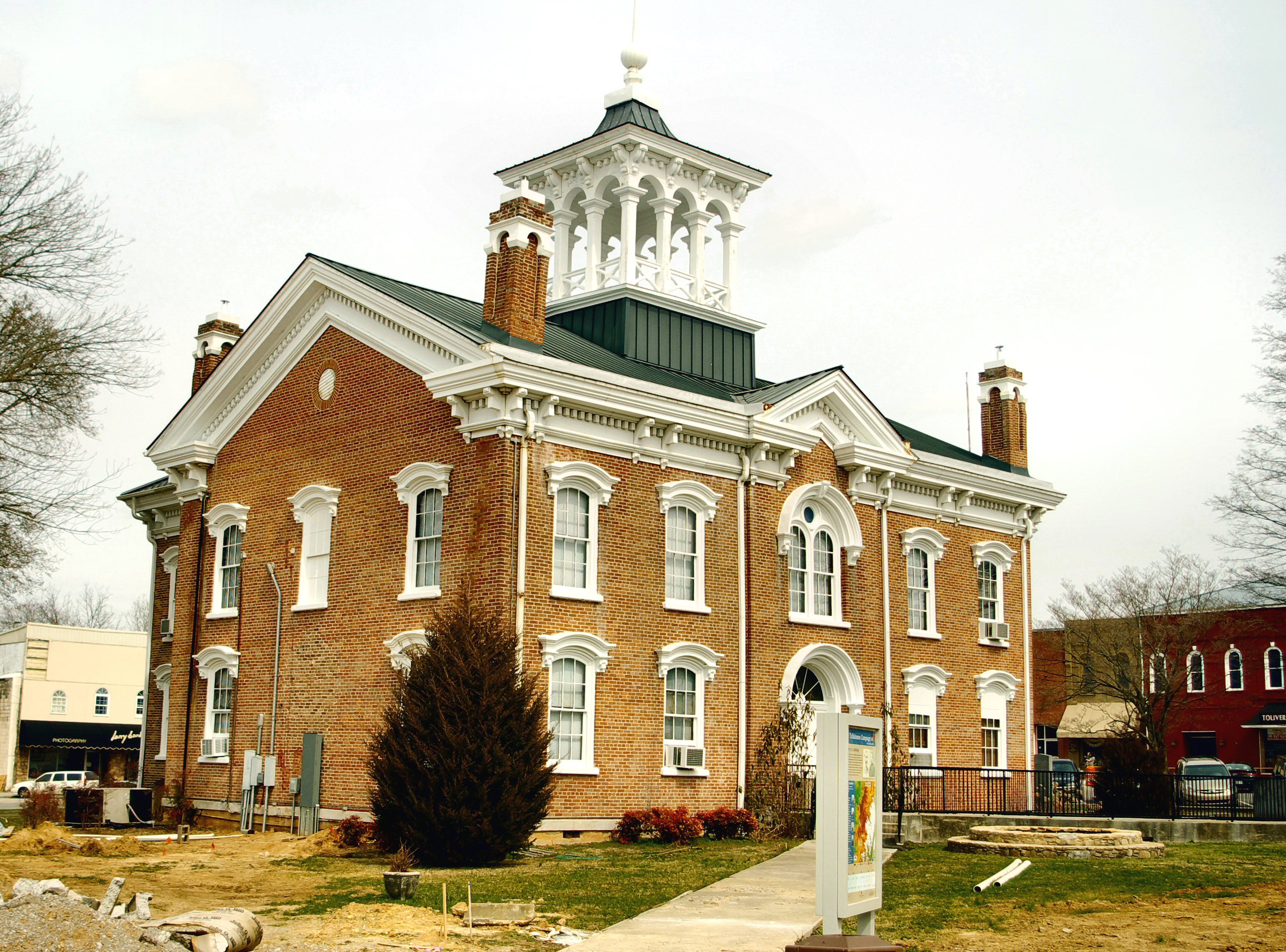

- Location within Tennessee
- Interactive map showing the location of Coffee County Courthouse
- Location: Public Sq., Manchester, Tennessee
- Coordinates: 35°28′59″N 86°05′20″W
- Area: 1 acre (0.40 ha)
- Built: 1871
- Built by: Wright, J.O. & D.S.
- Architectural style: Italianate
- NRHP reference No.: 74001905
- Added to NRHP: February 12, 1974

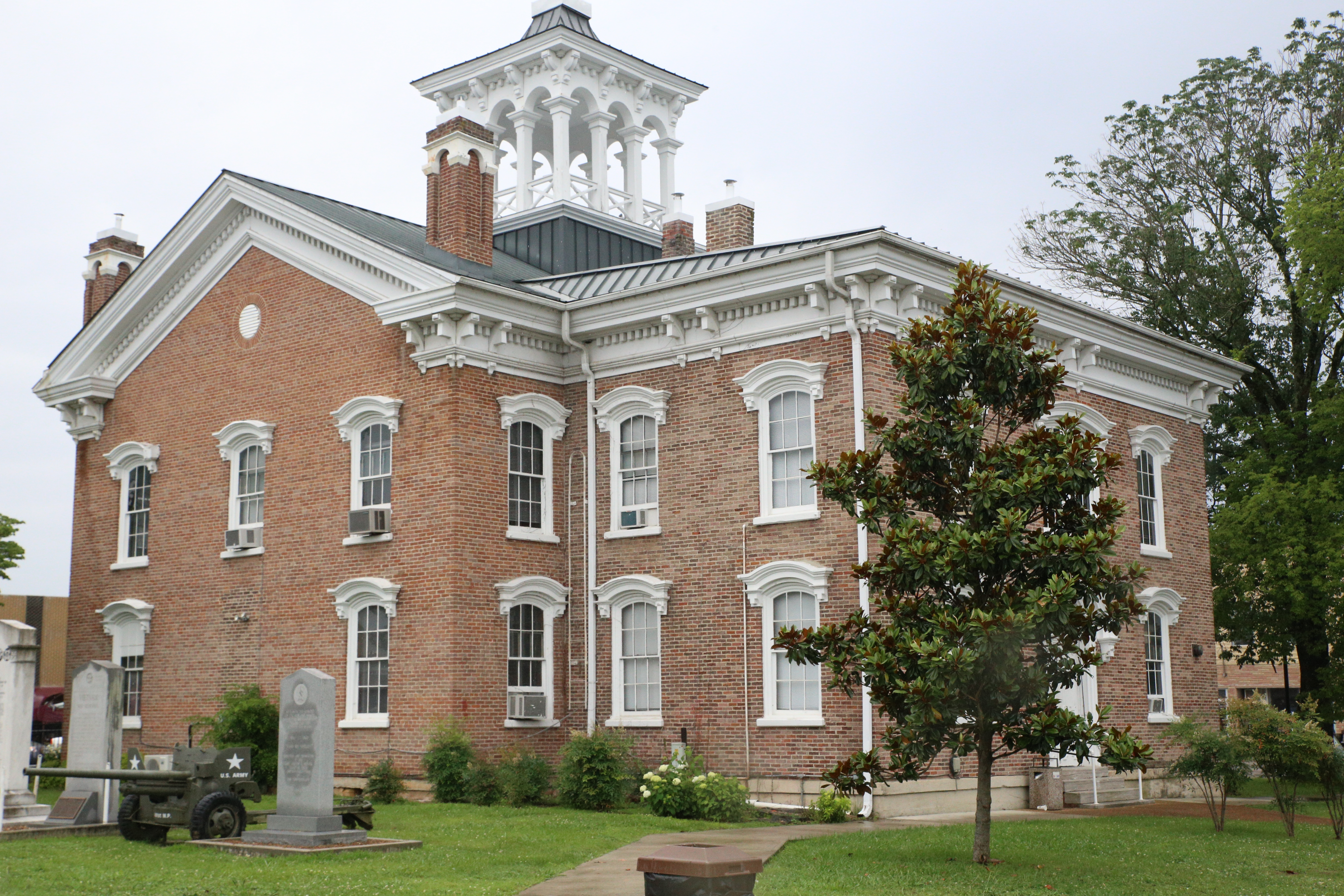
The Coffee County Courthouse in 2017

The Coffee County Courthouse in Manchester, Tennessee is a historic courthouse which was built in 1871. It was listed on the National Register of Historic Places in 1974.

It was built after the original 1837 courthouse was destroyed by a fire. It is a brick Italianate-style building, with brick laid in American bond.
