= Luverne Historic District =

Historic district in Alabama, United States

- U.S. National Register of Historic Places
- U.S. Historic district
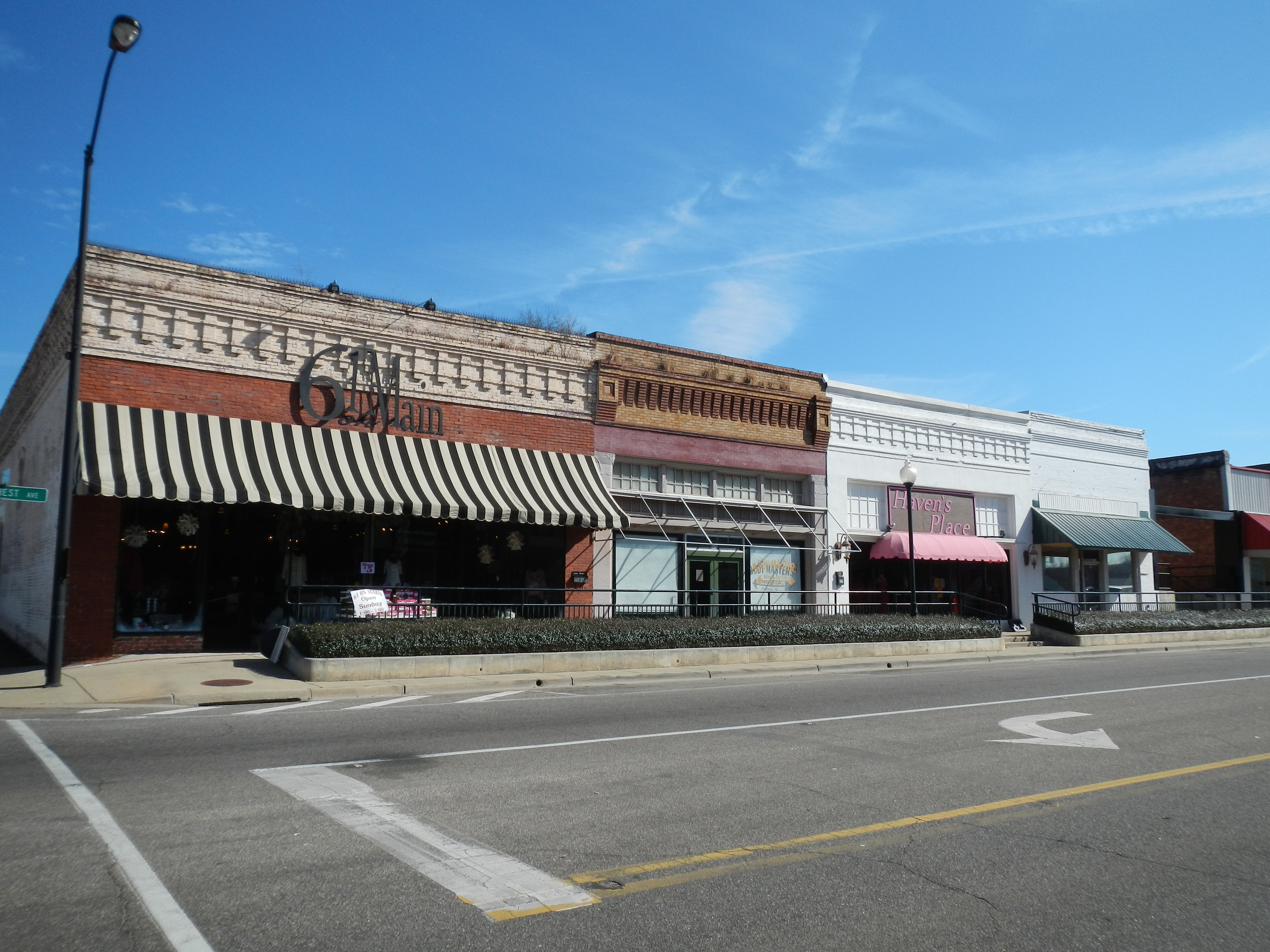

- Location within Alabama Location within the United States
- Location: Bounded by 1st, 6th Sts., Legrande, Glenwood, Folmar and Hawkins Aves., Luverne, Alabama
- Coordinates: 31.715312°N 86.263801°W
- Area: 100 acres (40 ha)
- Architect: Lutz, Earl G.; Blair, Algernon
- Architectural style: Queen Anne, Bungalow/craftsman
- NRHP reference No.: 04000926
- Added to NRHP: January 14, 2005

The Luverne Historic District is a 100-acre (40 ha) historic district in Luverne, Alabama, United States. It was listed on the National Register of Historic Places in 2005. It then included 161 contributing buildings.

The district is roughly bounded by 1st St., 6th St., and by Legrande, Glenwood, Folmar and Hawkins Avenues.

It includes works by architects Earl G. Lutz and Algernon Blair. It includes Queen Anne and Bungalow/craftsman architecture.

It includes the Crenshaw County Courthouse, on East Third Street, built in 1972, as a non-contributing resource.
