= Old Marengo County Courthouse =

- U.S. National Register of Historic Places
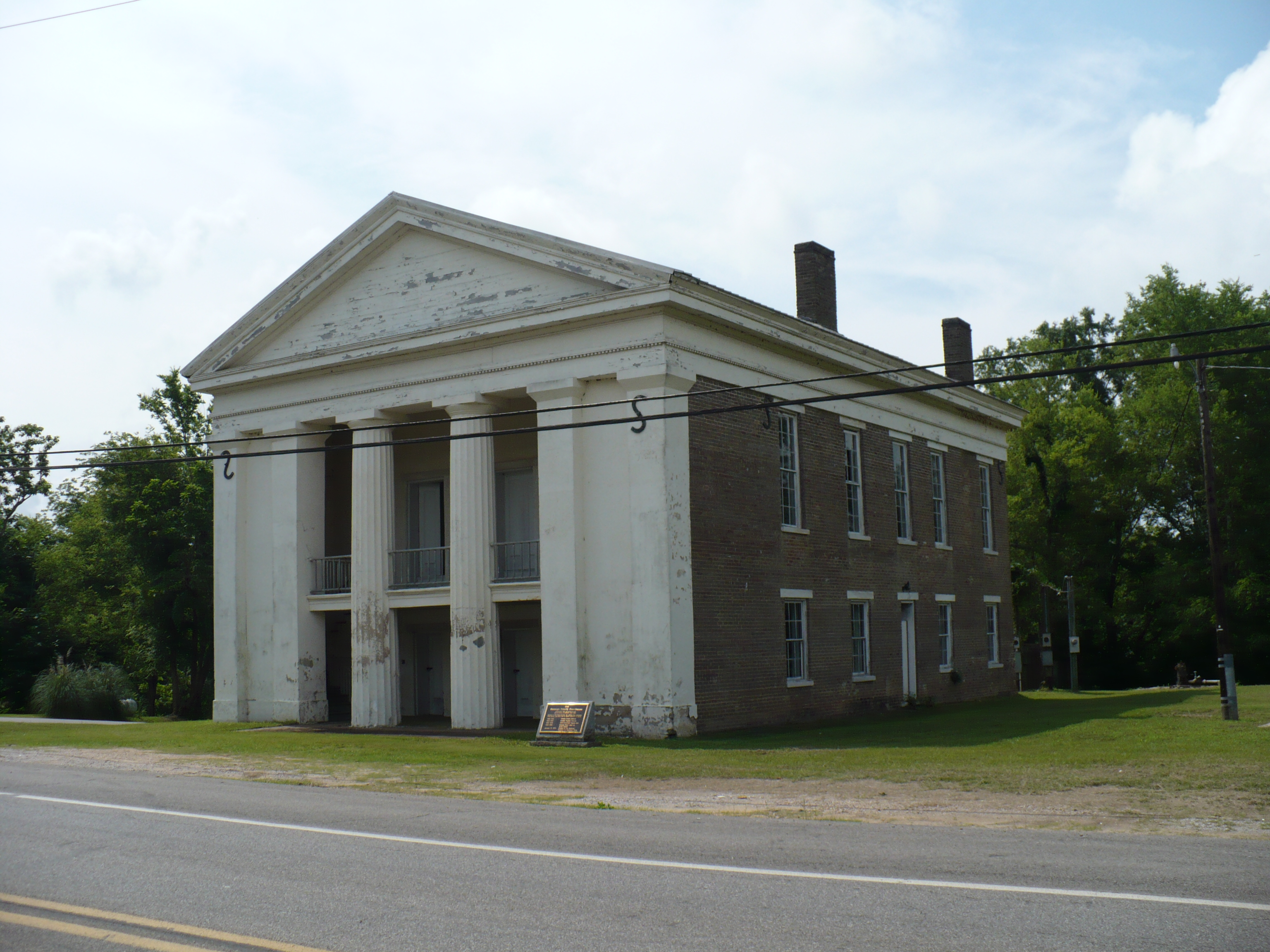
- The Old Marengo County Courthouse in 2009.
- Location: 300 West Cahaba Avenue; Linden, Alabama, U.S.
- Coordinates: 32°18′42.28″N 87°48′3.36″W
- Built: 1850
- Architectural style: Greek Revival
- NRHP reference No.: 74000426
- Added to NRHP: 1974

The Old Marengo County Courthouse, built in 1850, is a Greek Revival courthouse building located in Linden, Alabama, U.S. It was the third building to serve as the courthouse for Marengo County, Alabama, out of a total of five purpose-built courthouses. The courthouse was the site of a notable event on October 9, 1890, when nationally infamous train-robber and outlaw Reuben Houston "Rube" Burrow was shot and killed in the street in front of the building.

== History ==
After Marengo became a county in 1818, the first building to serve as a courthouse was a simple one-room log cabin. This was too small to meet the needs of the county and on 25 May 1825 the county commissioners met and resolved to have a new two-story structure built on Cahaba Avenue, Linden's business district at that time. This second courthouse was finished in 1827 and was used until it burned in 1848. This saw the construction of the third building in 1850, on the site of the old. The new building would serve as the courthouse continuously, except for a brief period during Federal Reconstruction when the county seat was moved to Demopolis, until 1902.

In 1902, the county commissioners decided that a much larger courthouse was needed. They also decided that a better location was needed, as the business district of Linden had shifted to a location about a mile to the southeast. A new three-story Richardsonian Romanesque style courthouse with a five-story clock tower was then built at the corner of North Main Street and East Coats Avenue, leaving the old courthouse for use as a public school. In 1915 the building was purchased by the Missionary Society of Linden Baptist Church, for use as a church. In 1949 the building was sold to the Veterans of Foreign Wars organization for use as a meeting hall. From the 1960s until the present the building has sat largely empty and unused.

== Gallery ==
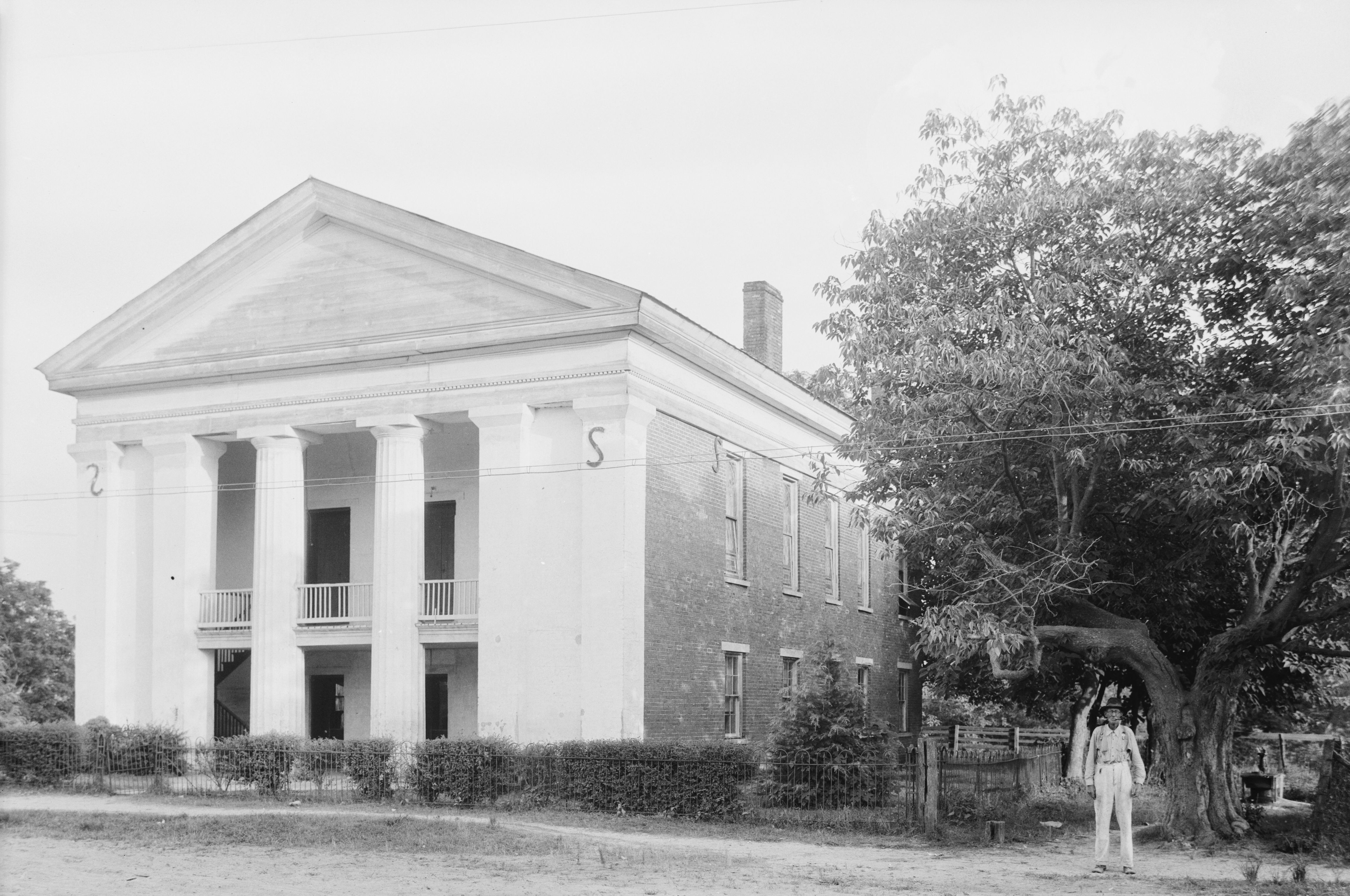
The front (northern) and northwestern facade in 1935.

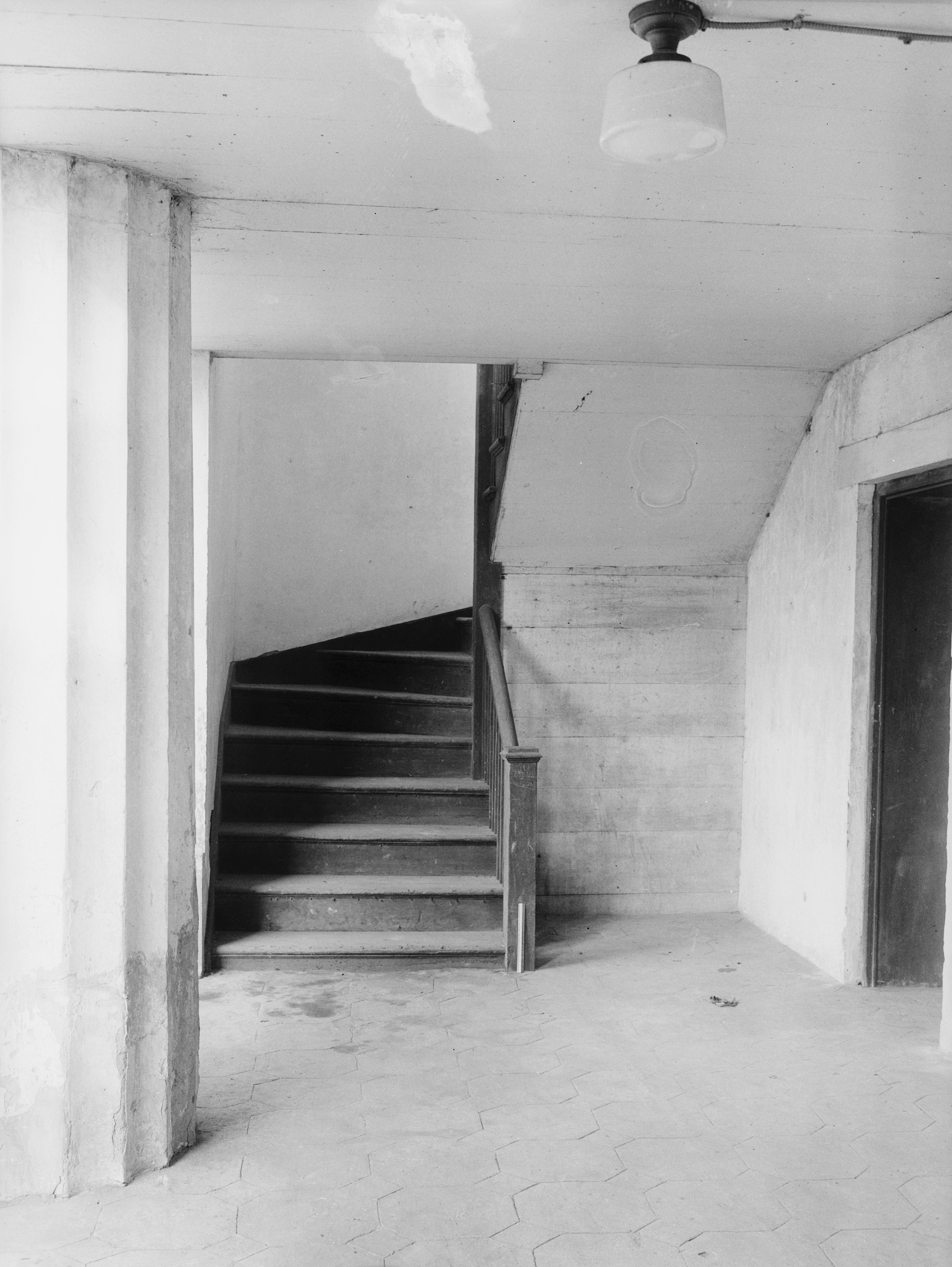
Staircase from ground level to balcony.

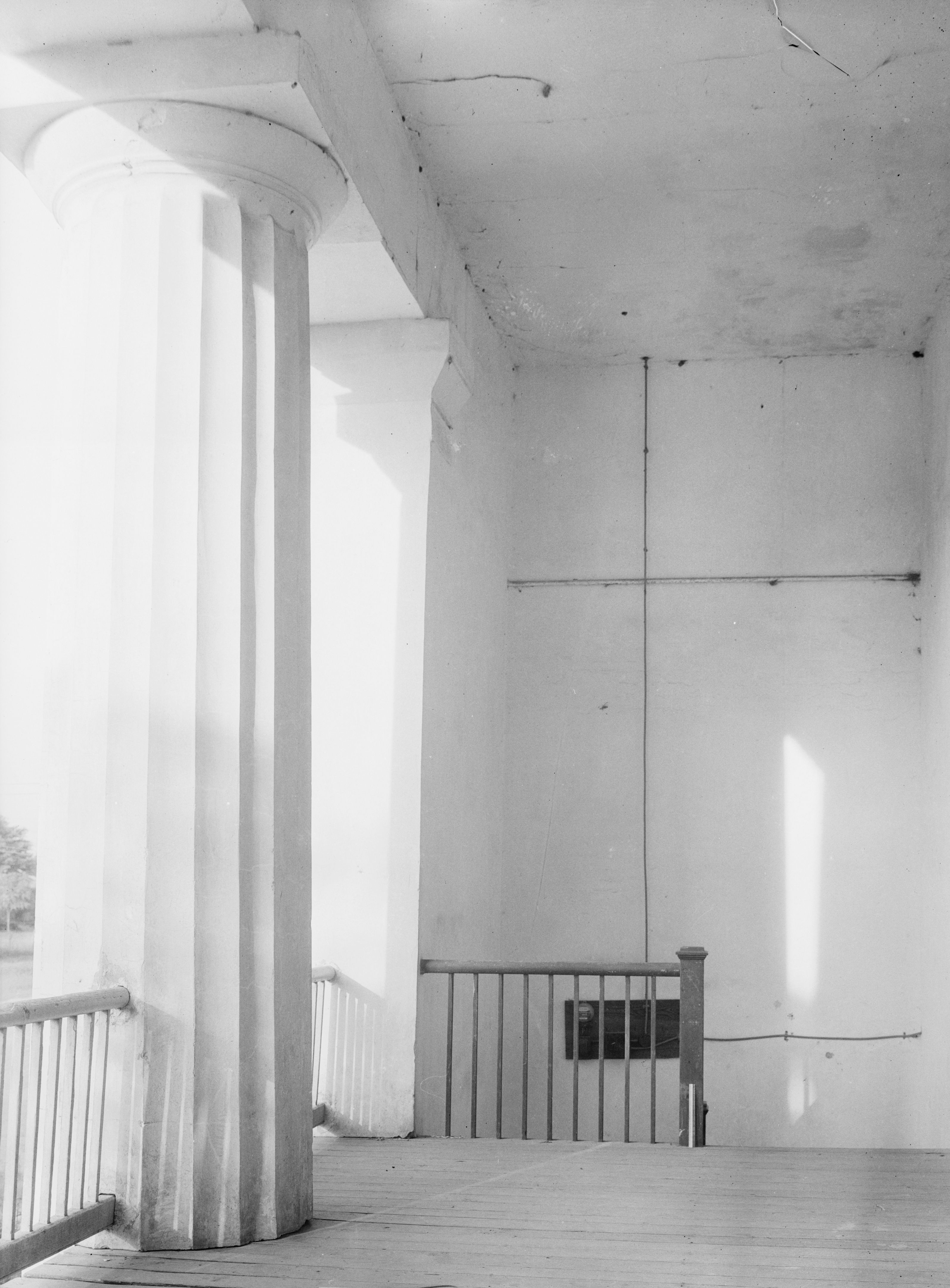
Staircase from balcony to ground level.

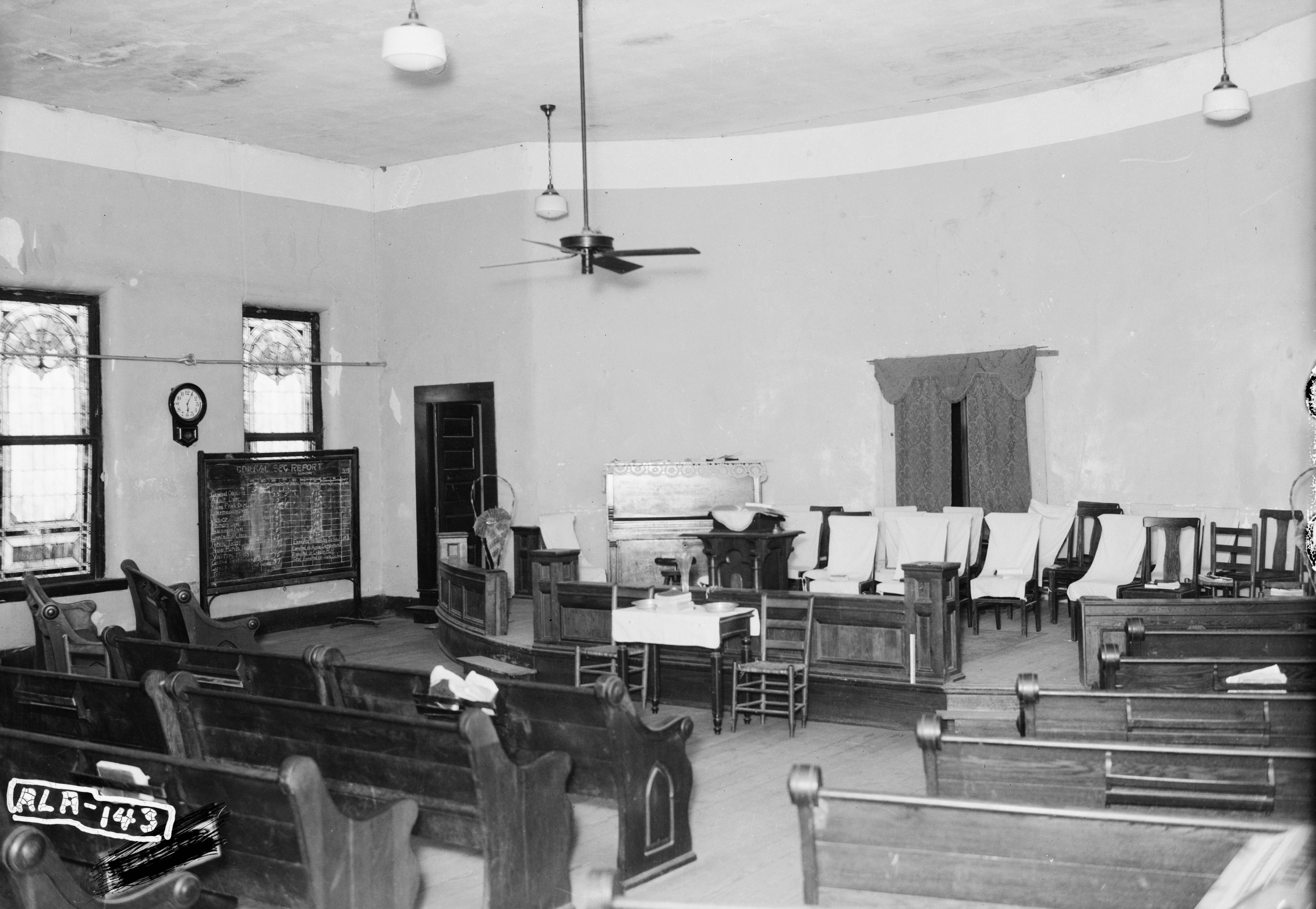
Second floor courtroom.

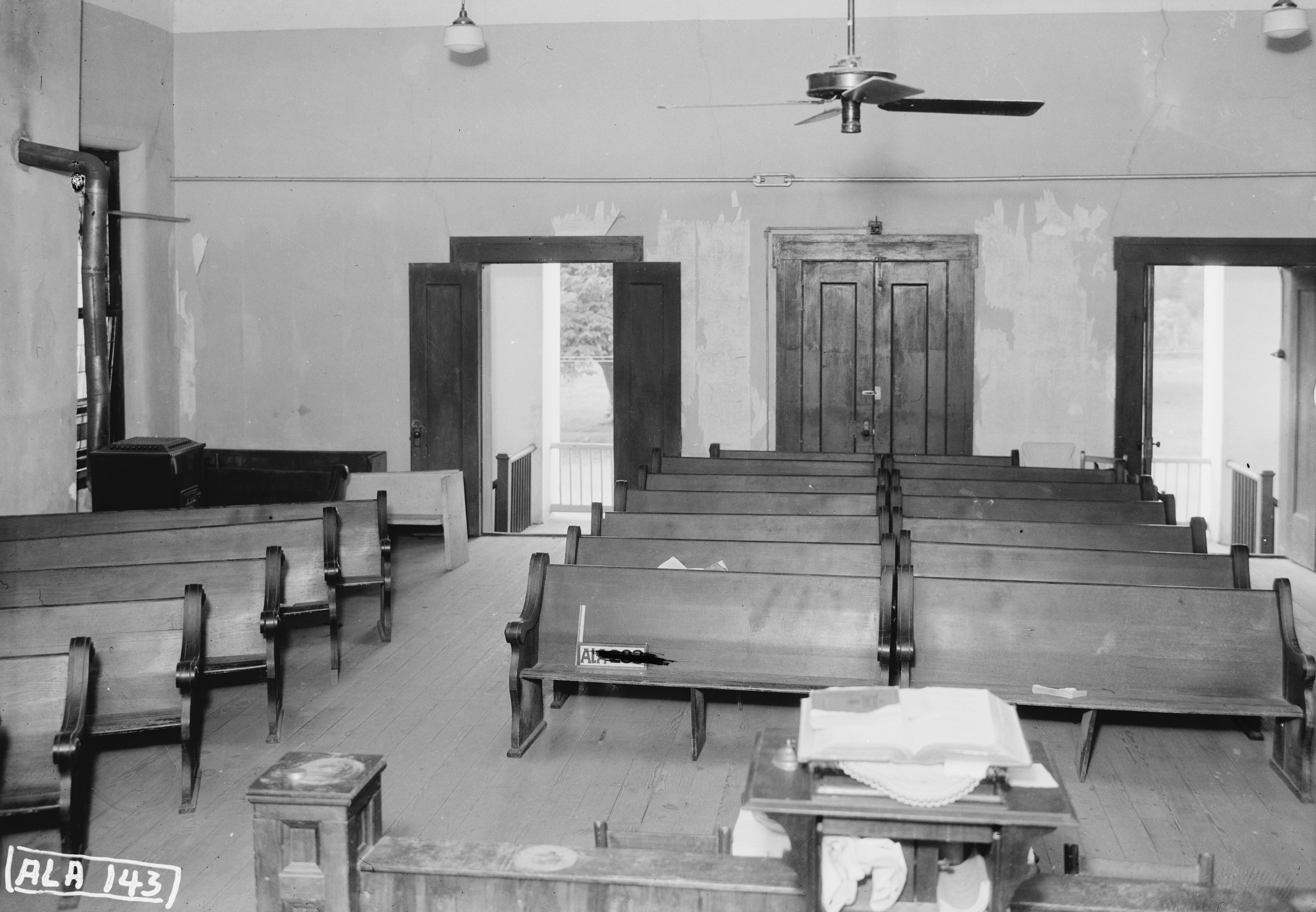
Second floor courtroom.

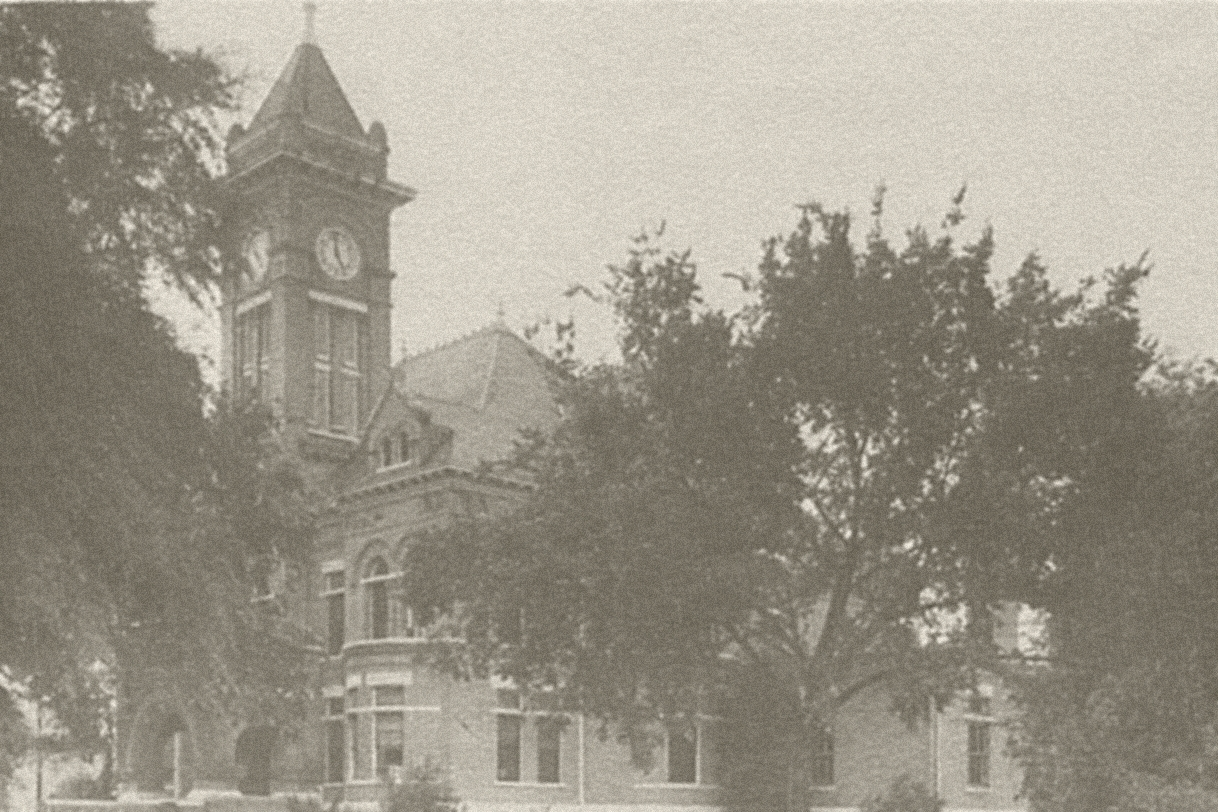
The replacement courthouse, built 1902.
