= Madison County Courthouse (Alabama) =

Coordinates: 34°43′49″N 86°35′6″W

The Madison County Courthouse is located in downtown Huntsville, Alabama one block north of the Big Spring. Since the creation of Madison County in 1807, there have been 4 courthouses throughout its history with the current one having been built in 1967. As of 2026, there are plans regarding demolishing the courthouse and building a new one on the same site.

== First courthouse ==
The first Madison County Courthouse was built in 1818, one year before Alabama became a state and also served as the Alabama State capital building for a year until the capital building in Cahaba finished. It was a Brick building with two floors and was located on the south side of the courthouse square. Plans for demolition began in 1835 and was demolished later that year. The New courthouse was constructed between 1835 and 1836.

== Second courthouse and bell ==
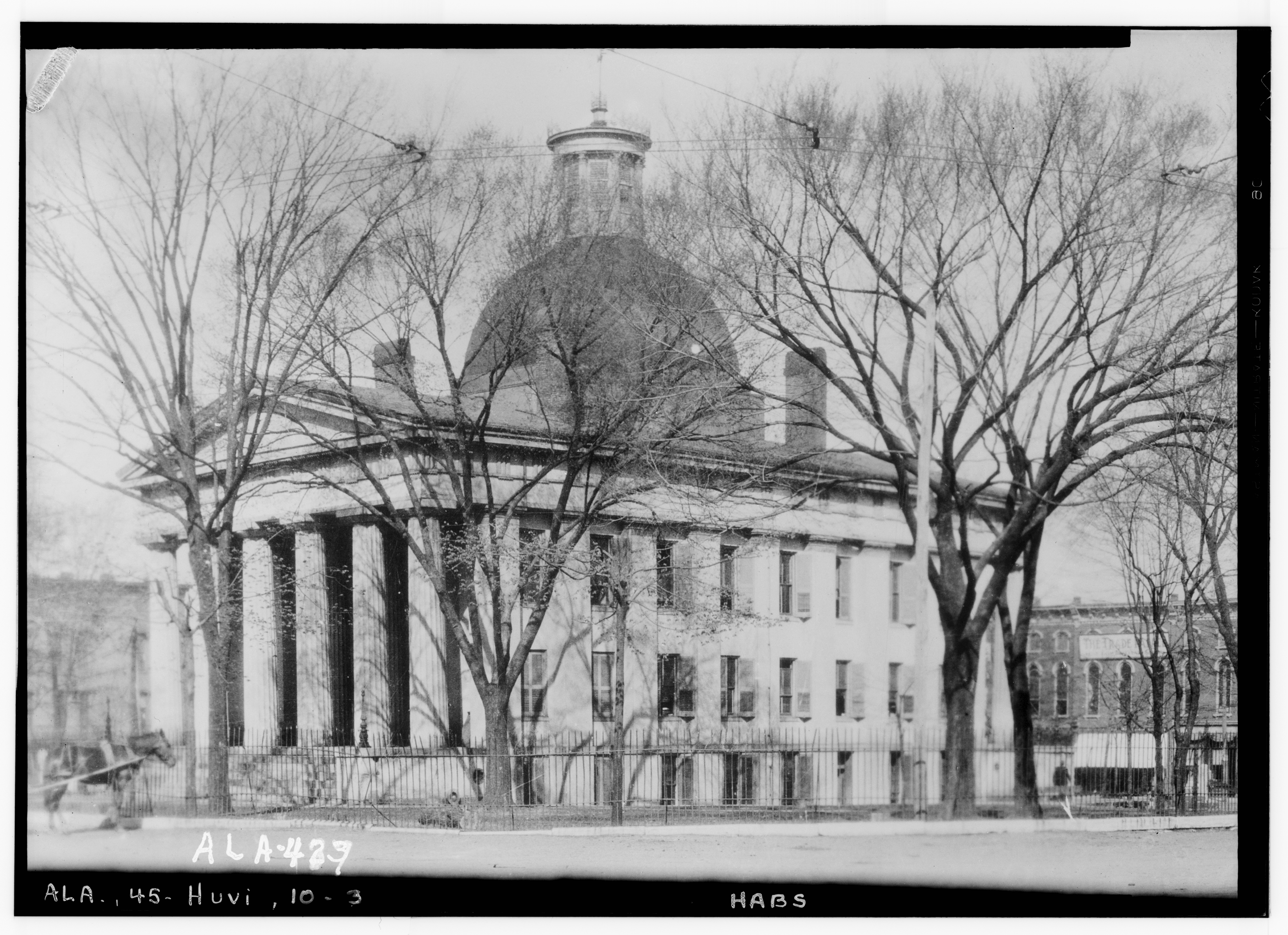
Second courthouse (1840–1912)

The second courthouse was opened in 1840 and was designed by George Steel in the Greek-Revival architecture that was common at the time. Construction of the courthouse costed approximately $52,000 ($1,867,000 in 2026) and had two floors and a basement that was partially underground and was 112 ft long and 56 ft wide (34.1m x 17m). It featured a doric portico with 6 columns on the front made of marble. In April 1849, a new clock and bell were added to the courthouse at a cost of $800 ($35,000 in 2026) which were completed by January 1850. By 1912, calls to replace the courthouse or expand it were proposed as the building was deteriorating and was becoming too small to serve Madison County as by this point the population of the county had reached 47,000 people. The courthouse was partially demolished in 1912 with the bell, columns, and the weather vane being removed prior to demolition and were later restored and added to the third courthouse.

== Third courthouse ==
The third courthouse began construction in 1912 and opened by 1914. It was designed by Clarence Kelley Colley and reused the bell and some of the columns from the second courthouse. It reused some of the walls of the second courthouse and added two new wings to the side of the courthouse. Like the previous courthouse, it was also designed in the Greek revival architecture. By the 1950s, the population of Huntsville and Madison county would begin to grow rapidly and soon came the Redstone arsenal as well as the construction of the Marshall Space Flight Center which quickly made the third county courthouse become too small for the rapidly growing population. By the 1960s the population of Huntsville went from 16,000 to 72,000, which was about the same population as the entire county in the previous census. The building was ultimately demolished completely by the mid-1960s to make way for a more modern courthouse, however the columns still remain today outside the Huntsville Botanical Gardens off Bob Wallace Avenue. The Bell of this courthouse still stands today in the Southeast corner of the square near the intersection of Franklin Street and Eustis Avenue. The weather vane was moved to the First National Bank across the street from the courthouse.

== Current courthouse ==
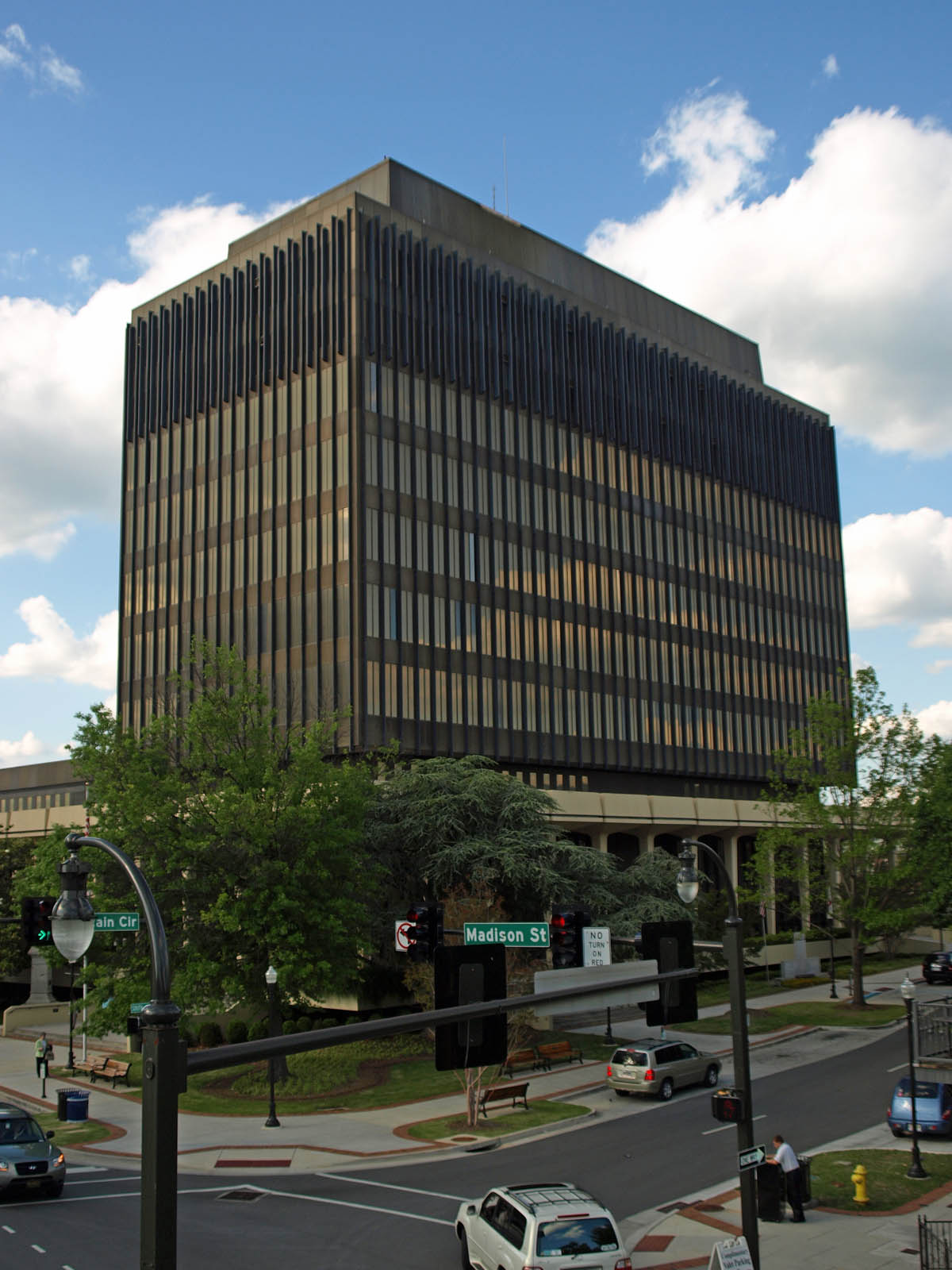
The fourth courthouse, pictured in 2011.

The current Madison County Courthouse was built in 1966 and opened by 1967. It was by far the largest of the four courthouses that served Madison County. It was built to accommodate the growing population and economy that the space race brought to the Huntsville area. It is a 8-story building with the upper two floors being dedicated to holding prisoners. The design of the current courthouse was of the International Style of architecture. It is one of the most recognizable buildings in downtown Huntsville due to its design and it being one of the tallest buildings in the city. In November 2025, plans on replacing the courthouse were proposed due to numerous issues with the 59 year old courthouse such as the HVAC, hot water system, and the electrical system of the building. In August 2026, plans to demolish the building were announced along with the opening date of a new courthouse by 2030. While exact details for what the fifth courthouse are not yet known, plans for its designs will begin in September 2026 and will be finished by September 2027.
