= Fayette County Courthouse Historic District =

Historic district in Alabama, United States

- U.S. National Register of Historic Places
- U.S. Historic district
- Alabama Register of Landmarks and Heritage
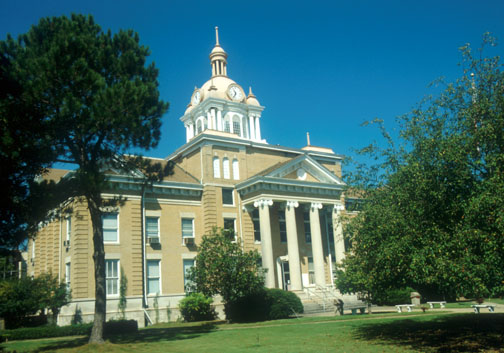
- The Fayette County Courthouse

- Location within Alabama Location within the United States
- Interactive map showing the location of Fayette County Courthouse Historic District
- Location: Roughly area between Peyton and Caine Sts., and Luxapalilla St. and railroad tracks; also Temple Ave. N. & S., 1st Ave. E. & W., 2nd St. S., 1st St. N., Fayette, Alabama
- Coordinates: 33°41′5″N 87°49′52″W
- Area: 7 acres (2.8 ha)
- Built: 1911
- NRHP reference No.: 76000326 (original); 12001020 (increase)

Significant dates
- Added to NRHP: April 30, 1976
- Boundary increase: March 26, 2014
- Designated ARLH: February 26, 1975

The Fayette County Courthouse Historic District is a historic district covering the downtown central business district of Fayette, Alabama, United States. The majority of the buildings in the district were constructed soon after a fire destroyed the town in 1911; the architectural styles reflect common styles in commercial buildings around the Southern United States at the beginning of the 20th century. The district was listed on the National Register of Historic Places in 1976, and the boundaries of the district were increased in 2014.

== History ==
In 1883, Fayette County's courthouse was located about one mile (1.6 km) from the current location of downtown Fayette. That year, the Georgia Pacific Railway line between Columbus, Mississippi, and Birmingham was extended through Fayette County. Merchants began to move along the line, and in 1892, a new courthouse was constructed in the town that had grown near the station.

The majority of the central business district, including the courthouse, were destroyed by a fire on March 24, 1911. As the town began to rebuild, the town council passed building codes requiring all downtown structures to be constructed of brick, stone, or concrete.

== Contributing structures ==
The district contains 26 contributing properties, most of which were built soon after the fire of 1911. Most of the properties in the district face Temple Avenue, which runs north-to-south through downtown.

The centerpiece is the Fayette County Courthouse, completed in 1912. The two-story, Neoclassical structure sits in the middle of a park with memorials and monuments scattered throughout. A tree-lined sidewalk leads from the street to the courthouse's portico, which features four Ionic columns supporting a triangular pediment. The building is topped with a columned dome, the front face of which is adorned with a clock.

At the south end of the district sits the Southern Railway depot, completed in 1913. The station is constructed of red brick and features a low hipped roof and bracketed eaves. Next to the station is the five-story William M. Cannon Wholesale Grocery Building, completed in 1928. The tallest building in Fayette, it was originally intended to serve as a hotel, but was built with a wooden structure rather than steel, failing to meet the city's building code.

The courthouse and adjacent Fayette County Bank are the only buildings in the district designed in a Neoclassical style. The majority of other buildings represent the Early Commercial style, although some feature influences from Mediterranean and Asian architecture. All but two buildings were constructed of brick: the Old Post Office (completed 1911) is of stone and stucco, and the F.A. Nuckols Building (1912) is of concrete block.
