= Lee County Courthouse (Alabama) =

- U.S. National Register of Historic Places
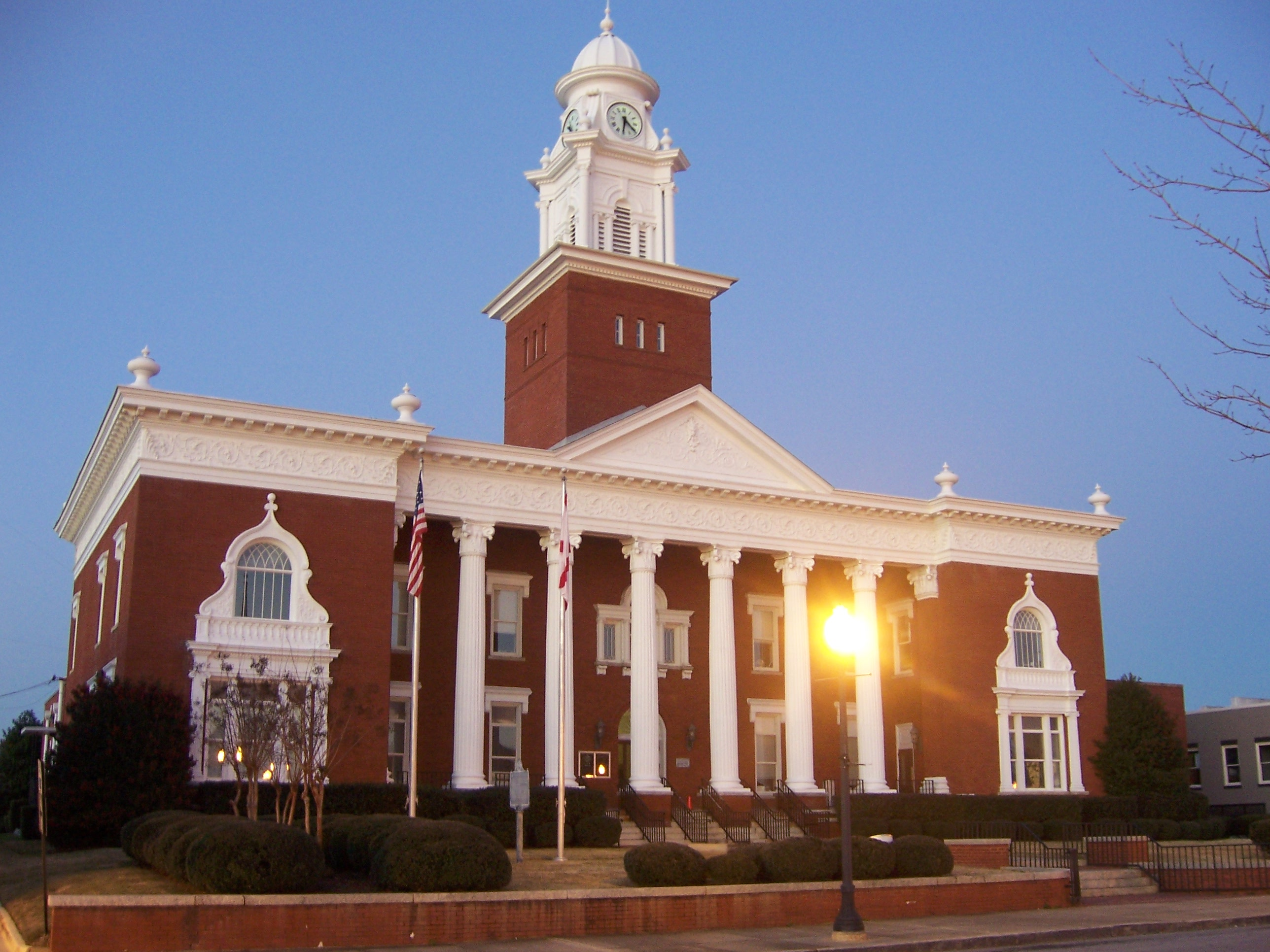

- Location within Alabama Location within the United States
- Interactive map showing the location of Lee County Courthouse
- Location: S. 9th St. between Aves. A and B, Opelika, Alabama
- Coordinates: 32°38′45″N 85°22′46″W
- Area: less than one acre
- Built: 1896
- Built by: Andrews & Stevens
- Architect: Andrew J Bryan
- Architectural style: Classical Revival
- NRHP reference No.: 73000353
- Added to NRHP: July 23, 1973

The Lee County Courthouse is a historic two-story brick county courthouse in Opelika, Alabama, the county seat of Lee County, Alabama. It was constructed in 1896 and added to the National Register of Historic Places in 1973. It was designed by Atlanta architect Andrew J. Bryan and Company and was built by Andrews & Stevens. The building's design is Neoclassical architecture.

The courthouse building and a separate jail building were built for $35,000. The courthouse replaced a previous two-story brick courthouse, which was demolished after the new structure was completed.

== See also ==
- List of county courthouses in Alabama
