= Coffee County Courthouse (Elba, Alabama) =

- U.S. National Register of Historic Places
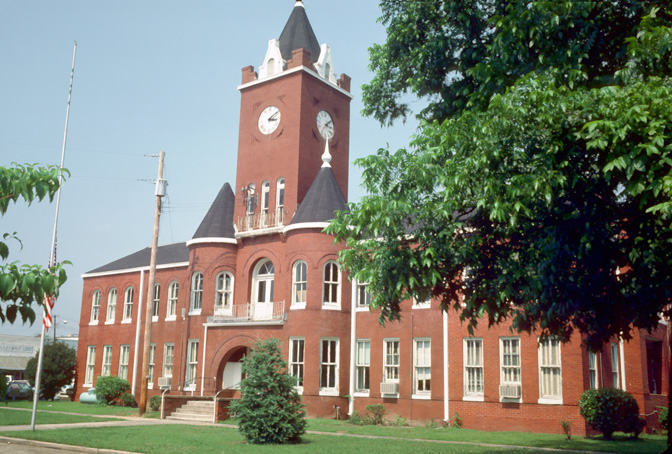

- Location within Alabama Location within the United States
- Interactive map showing the location of Coffee County Courthouse
- Location: Courthouse Sq., Elba, Alabama
- Coordinates: 31.41416°N 86.06559°W
- Area: 1 acre (0.40 ha)
- Built: 1903
- Architectural style: Romanesque Revival
- NRHP reference No.: 73000335
- Added to NRHP: May 8, 1973

The Coffee County Courthouse is a historic county courthouse in Courthouse Square in Elba, Alabama, United States, one of two county seats of Coffee County, Alabama. It was added to the National Register of Historic Places on May 8, 1973. It is located at 230 Court Avenue. Elba is subject to frequent floods of the Pea River; high water marks on the courthouse walls indicate the highest level reached in past floods.

Coffee County also has a courthouse in Enterprise that was built in 1998. The Elba courthouse serves the western portion of the county.

== See also ==
- National Register of Historic Places listings in Alabama
- List of county courthouses in Alabama
