= Seth Lore and Irwinton Historic District =

Historic district in Alabama, United States

- U.S. National Register of Historic Places
- U.S. Historic district
- Location within Alabama Location within the United States
- Location: Eufaula, Alabama
- Coordinates: 31°53′34″N 85°8′39″W
- Architectural style: Classical Revival, Bungalow/Craftsman, Late Victorian, Italianate, Gothic Revival
- NRHP reference No.: 86001534
- Added to NRHP: August 14, 1986

The Seth Lore and Irwinton Historic District is a historic district in Eufaula, Alabama, United States. It was listed on the National Register of Historic Places in 1973 as Lore Historic District; the registration document identified and described 72 specific buildings. And then its boundaries were increased and the district was renamed to "Seth Lore and Irwinton Historic District" in 1986; the entire area then contained 738 contributing buildings.

"The Seth Lore and Irwinton Historic District contains 942 properties (total adjusted to compensate for one double entry in the inventory) with six churches, including the state's oldest High Gothic First Presbyterian Church building (Inv #190, 1869) the Central Business District, three school buildings, two cemeteries, and a number of residences and neighborhood-based businesses. Of the 942 properties 738 are of architectural or historical significance, and fall within the period of significance of the district. A small percentage of these contributing structures (21.8%) have reversible alterations—such as the application of aluminum siding—that should be removed. / Encompassing the 19th century nucleus of Eufaula, the district contains an especially heavy concentration of buildings erected during the five decades between 1870 and 1920. Within the boundaries lie the Central Business District (CBD) which is located east of Eufaula Avenue and stretches north to Church Place and south to Barbour Street. Contained herein is one of the state's most coherent collections of intact, mld-to-late 19th century small-town commercial structures, including a relatively rare example of a small-town Second Empire building (Inv #313), and a fine mid-century cast iron-front bank building. Also represented within the CBD are some fine examples of Itallanate, Renaissance Revival, and other forms of more typical commercial architecture. Exemplified throughout the remaining portions of the district are some fine examples of Greek Revival cottages, the state's most extensive collection of domestic Itallanate architecture Including several exceptional examples of symmetrical-type Itallanate Villas, Queen Annes, Folk Victorians, Neoclassical Revivals, French Second Empires, Craftsman/ Bungalow, and a number of vernacular types, most of which fall along the line of Folk National forms or two rooms with central chimney houses."

With over 700 historic and architecturally significant structures, the district includes Alabama's most coherent collection of intact mid-to-late 19th century small town commercial buildings, as well as the state's most extensive collection of domestic Italianate architecture. The period of architectural, commercial, industrial and political significance is from 1825 to 1949. Architectural styles include Bungalow/Craftsman, Late Victorian, Classical Revival, Gothic Revival, and Greek Revival.

The original district comprised "about half of the old town of Irwinton which was first settled in 1823. Of the 72 structures in the district 59 date from the nineteenth century and 12 were built between 1900 and 1911."

Selected buildings and structures in the district include:

- Lampley Building (1847), 206 E. Broad St. "Two story brick building, ornamental brackets, arched windows, ornamental iron grille ventilators."

- Masonic Temple (1872), 227 E. Broad St. Italianate three-story building with flat roof with a central arch, extended eaves, and ornamental modillions.

- Eufaula Carnegie Library (1904), 217 North Eufaula: "Two story red brick with pressed yellow brick trim, a hipped roof 6' to 8’ overhanging caves, it has a wrought iron railing and lamp posts on either side of wide steps. Above entrance on second floor is a recessed balcony with four square columns, double glass doors with a leaded glass transom."

== Photo gallery ==
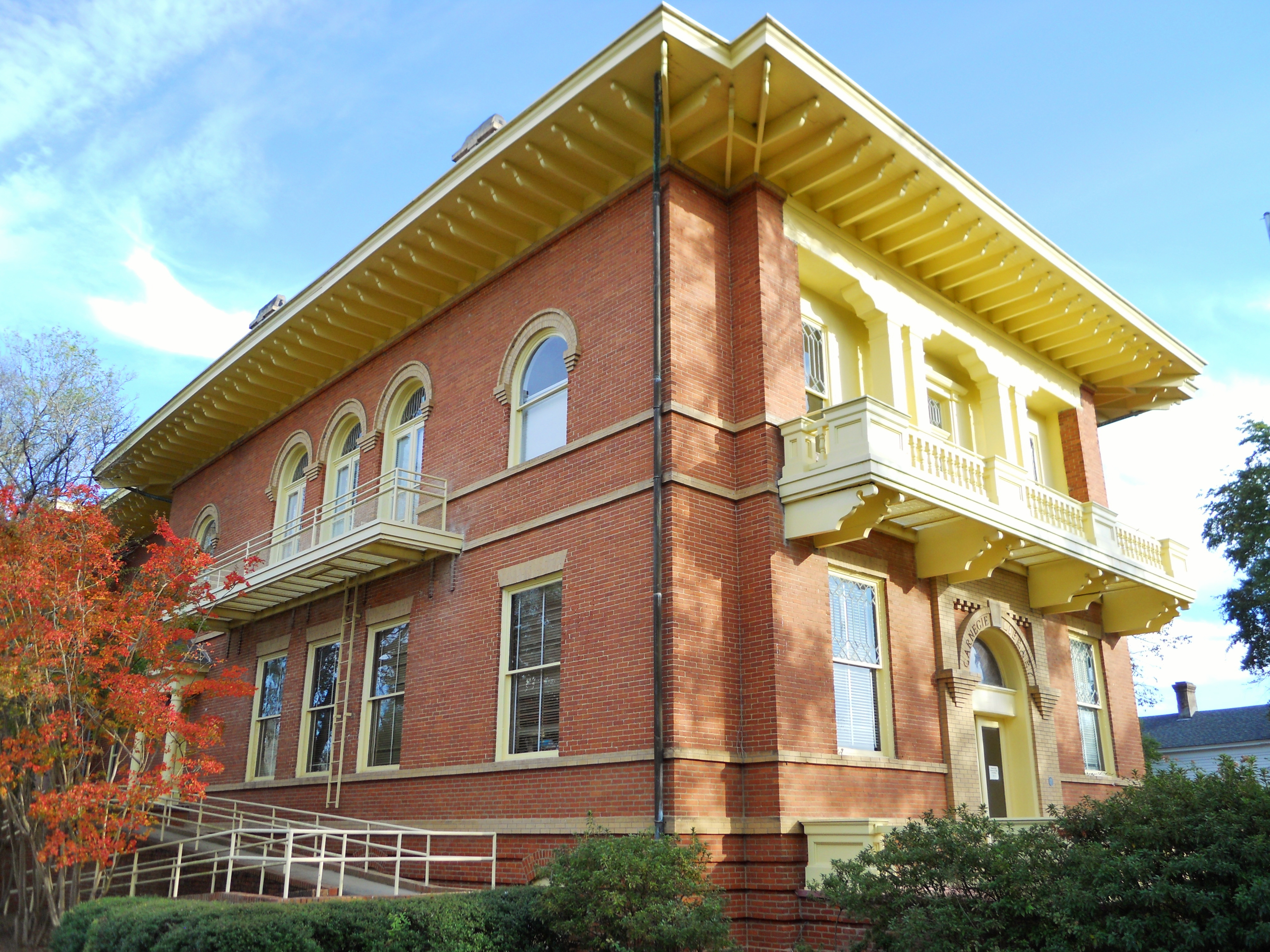
Eufaula Carnegie Library

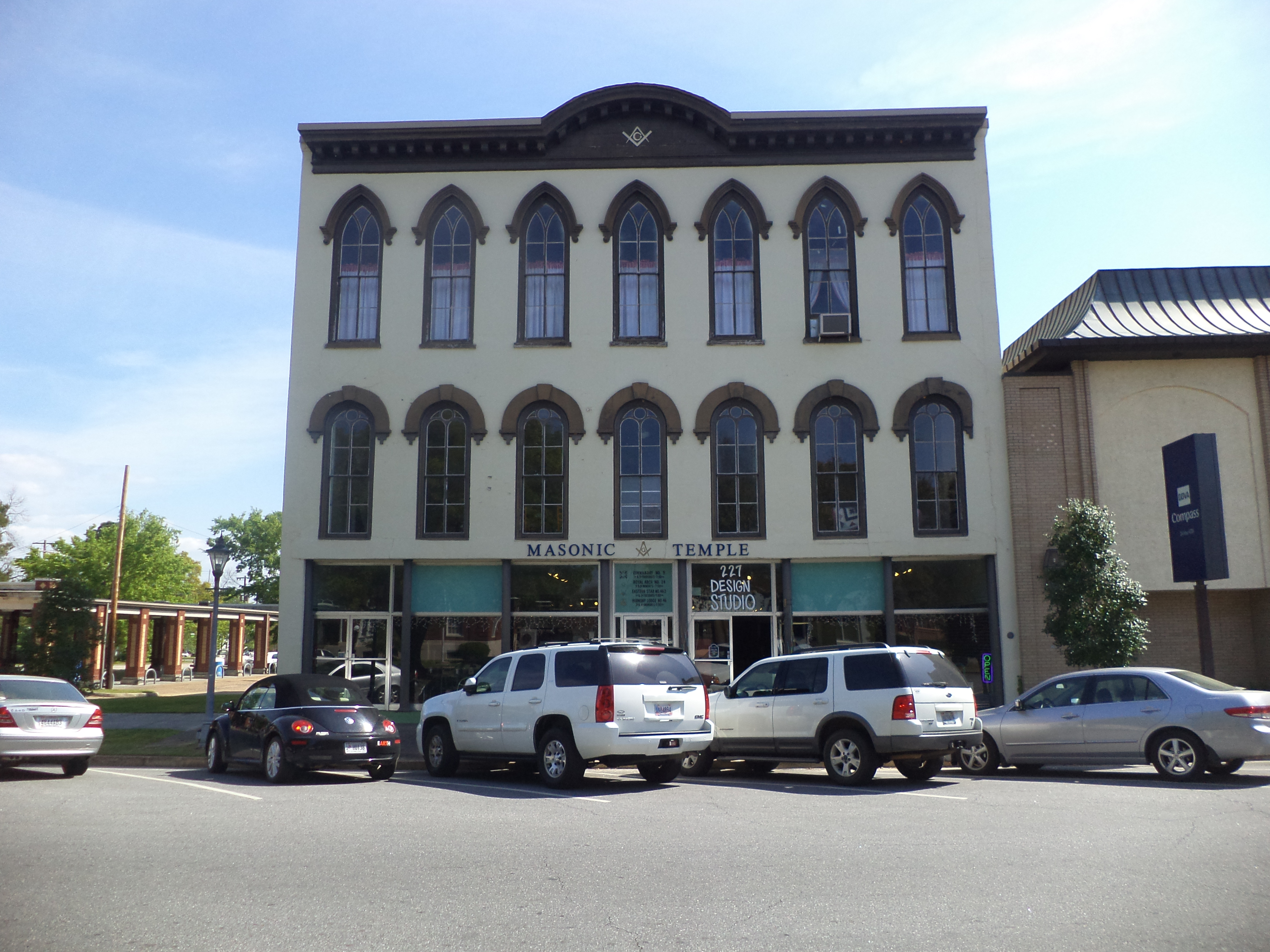
Masonic Temple

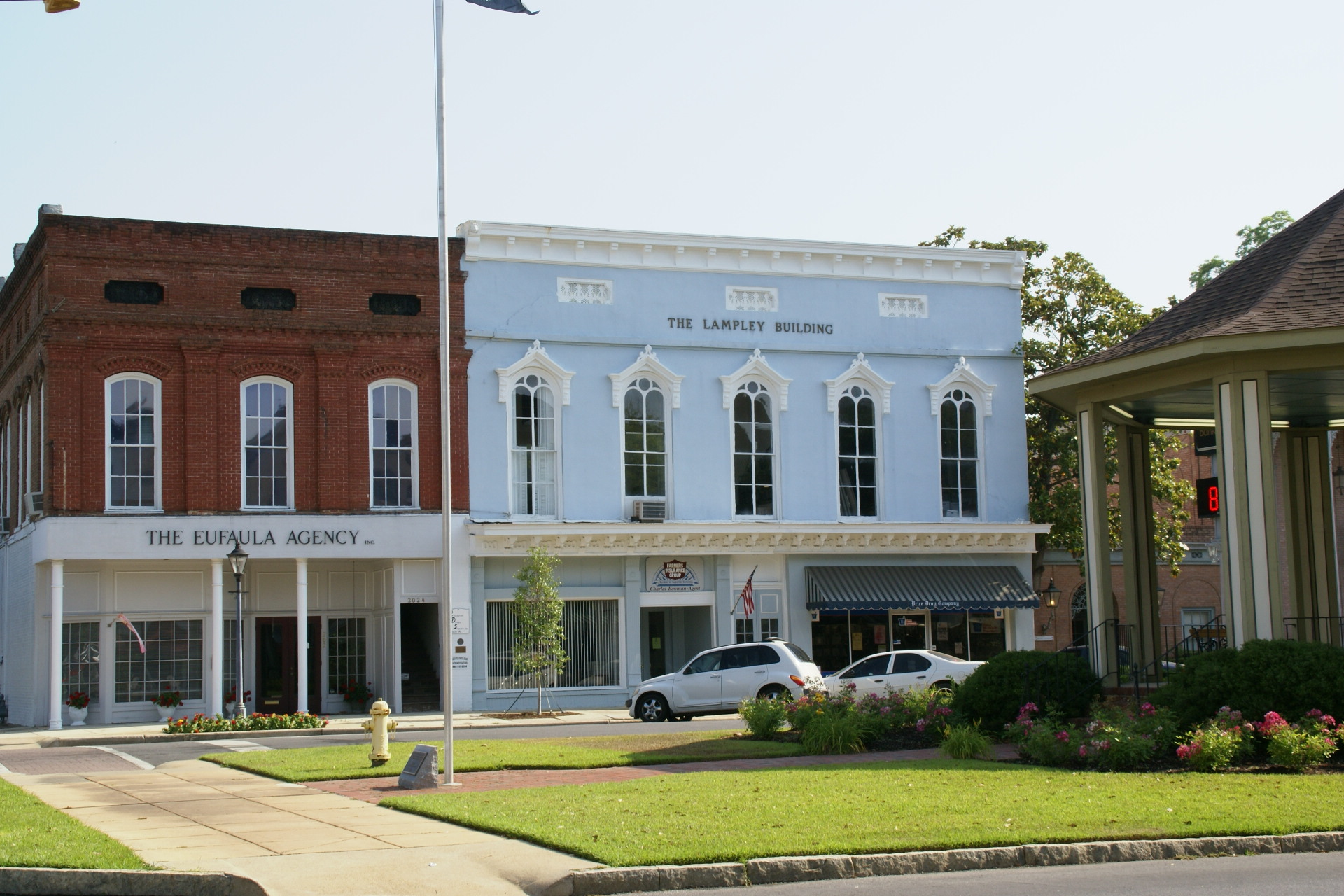
Lampley Building

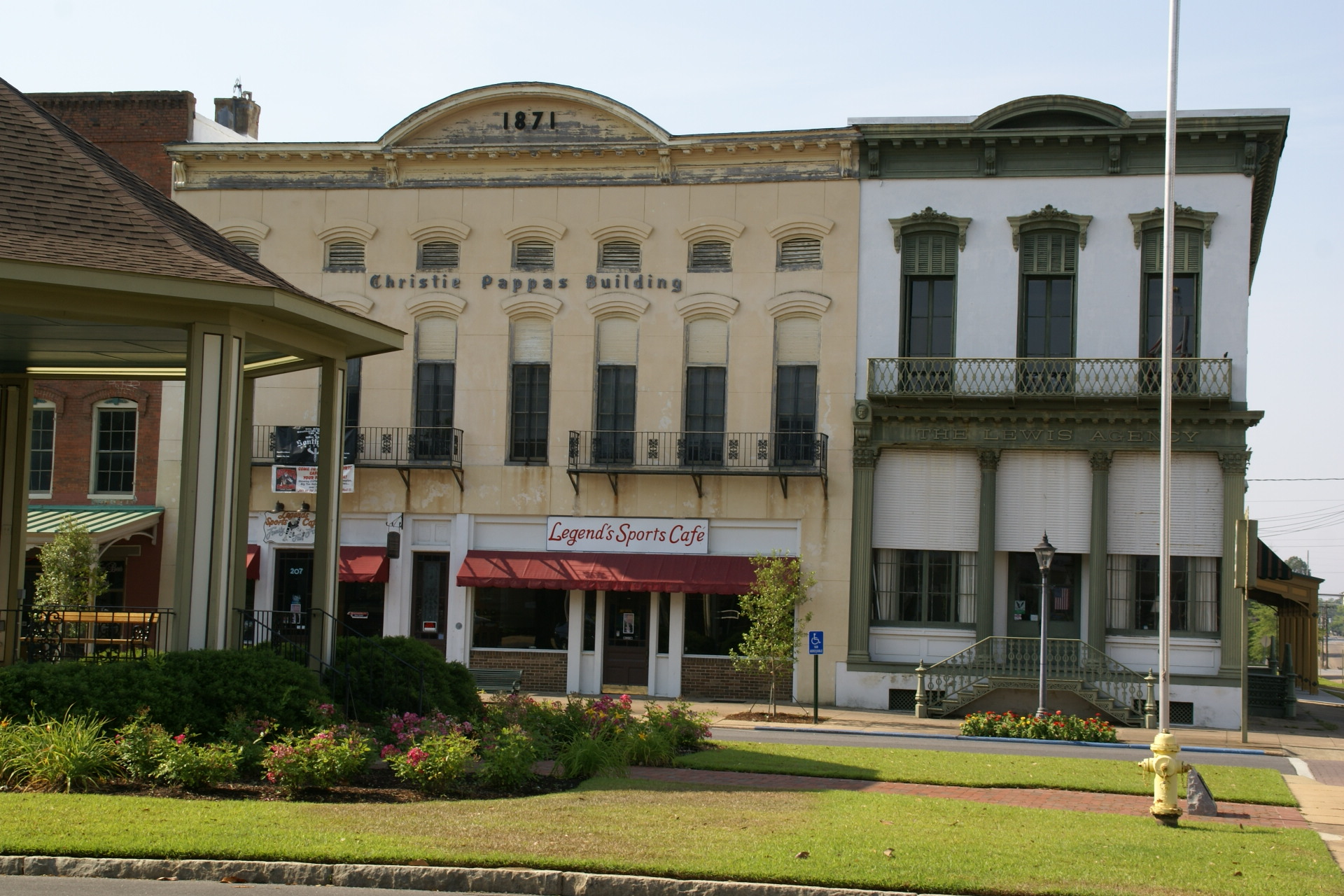

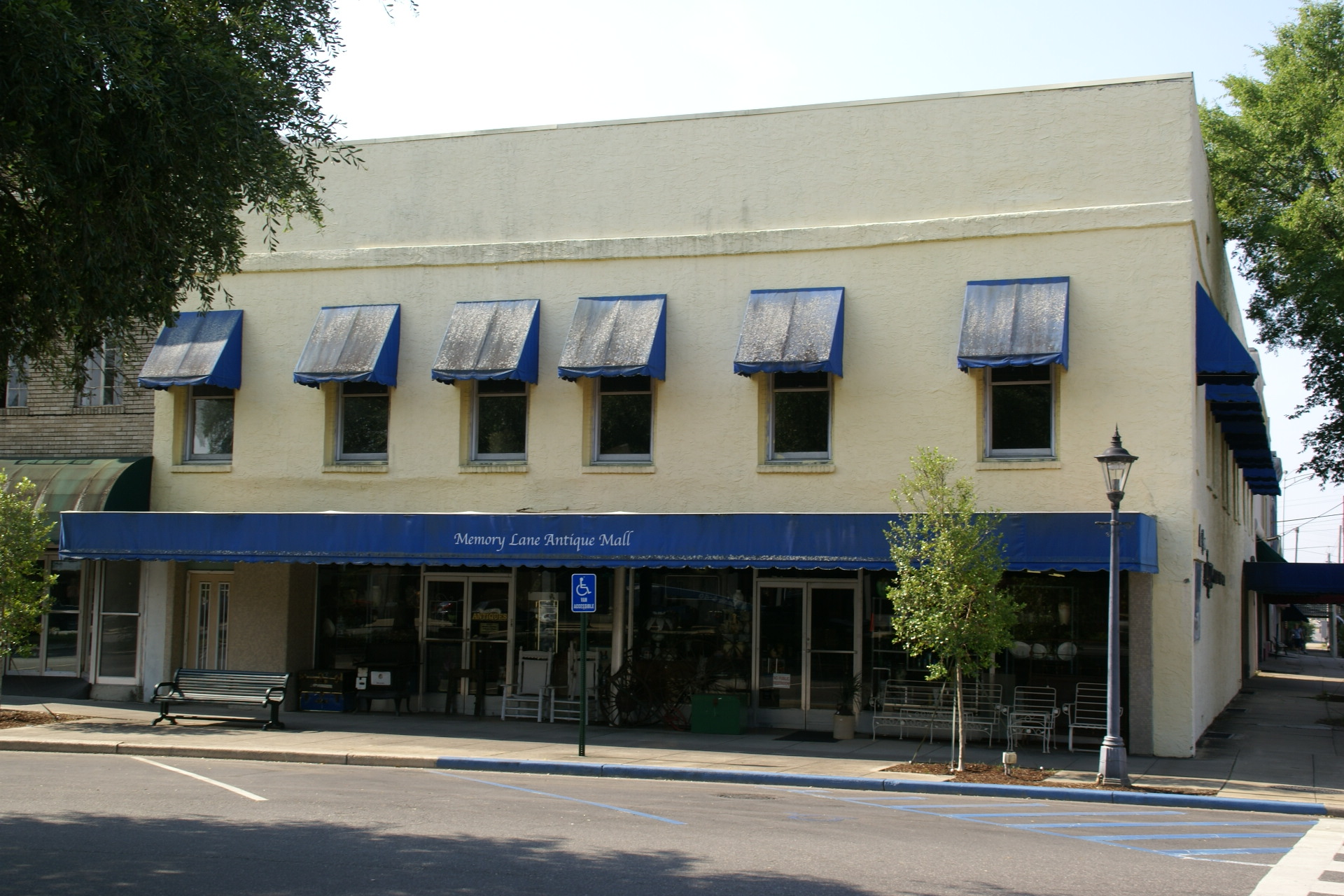

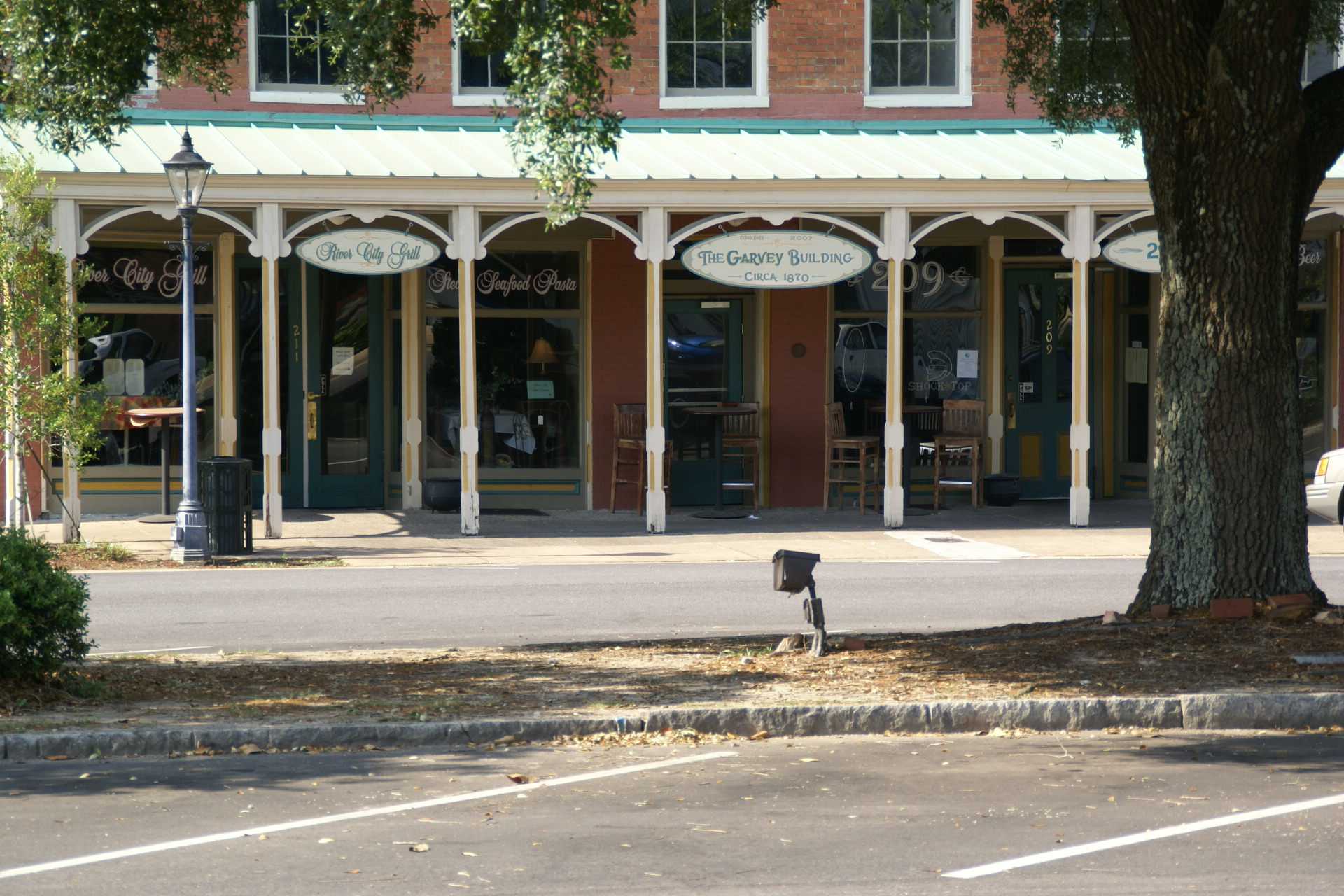

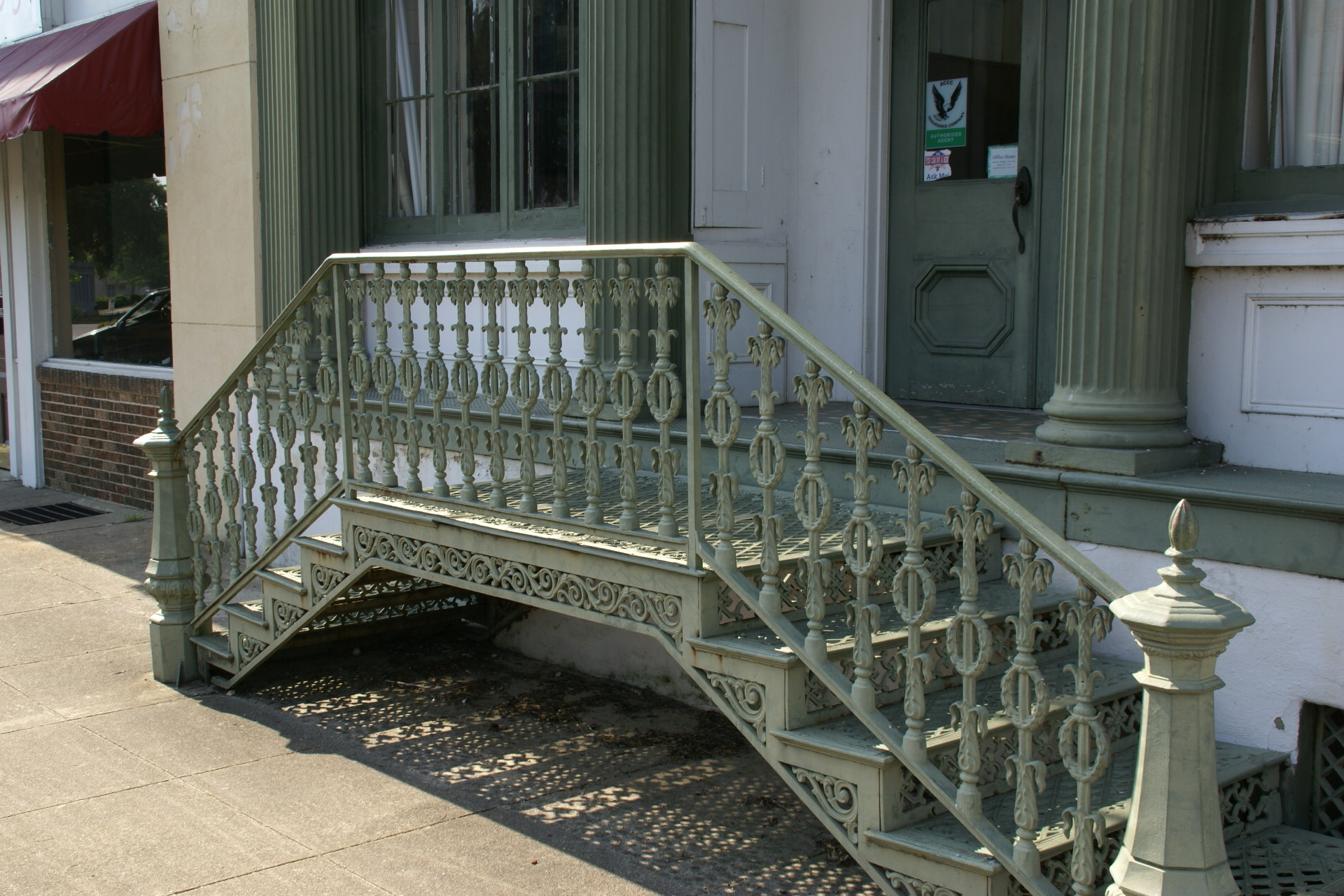

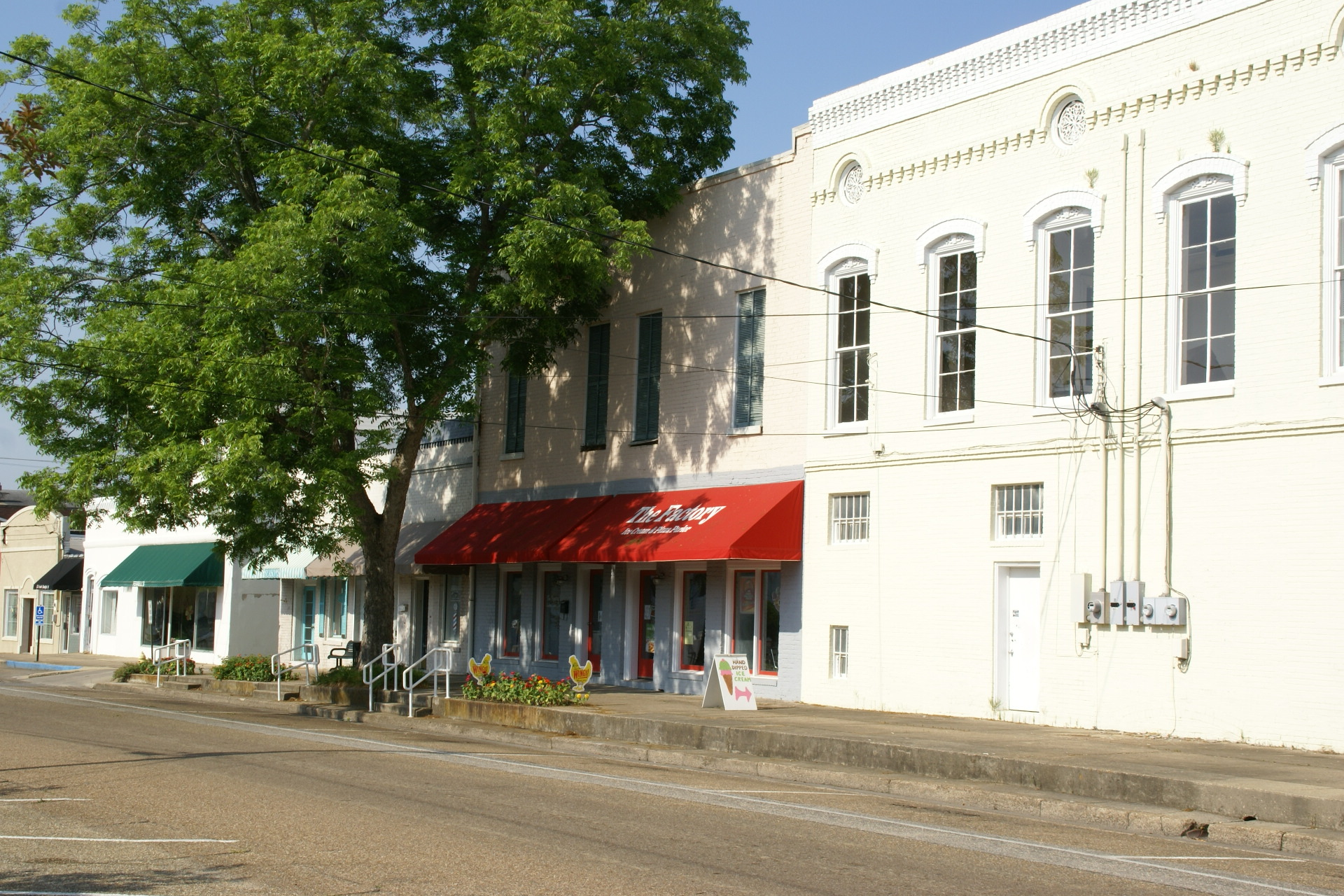

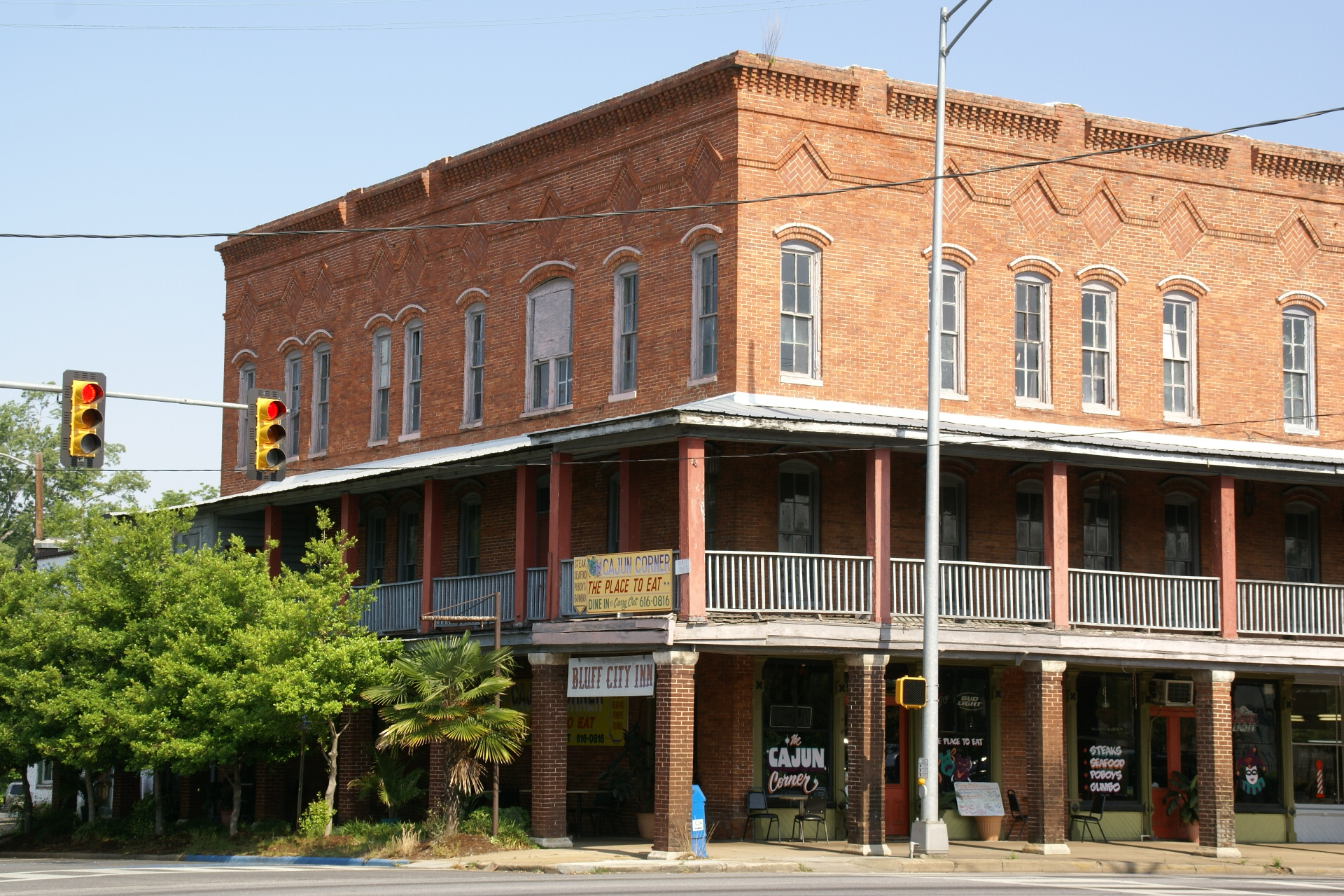

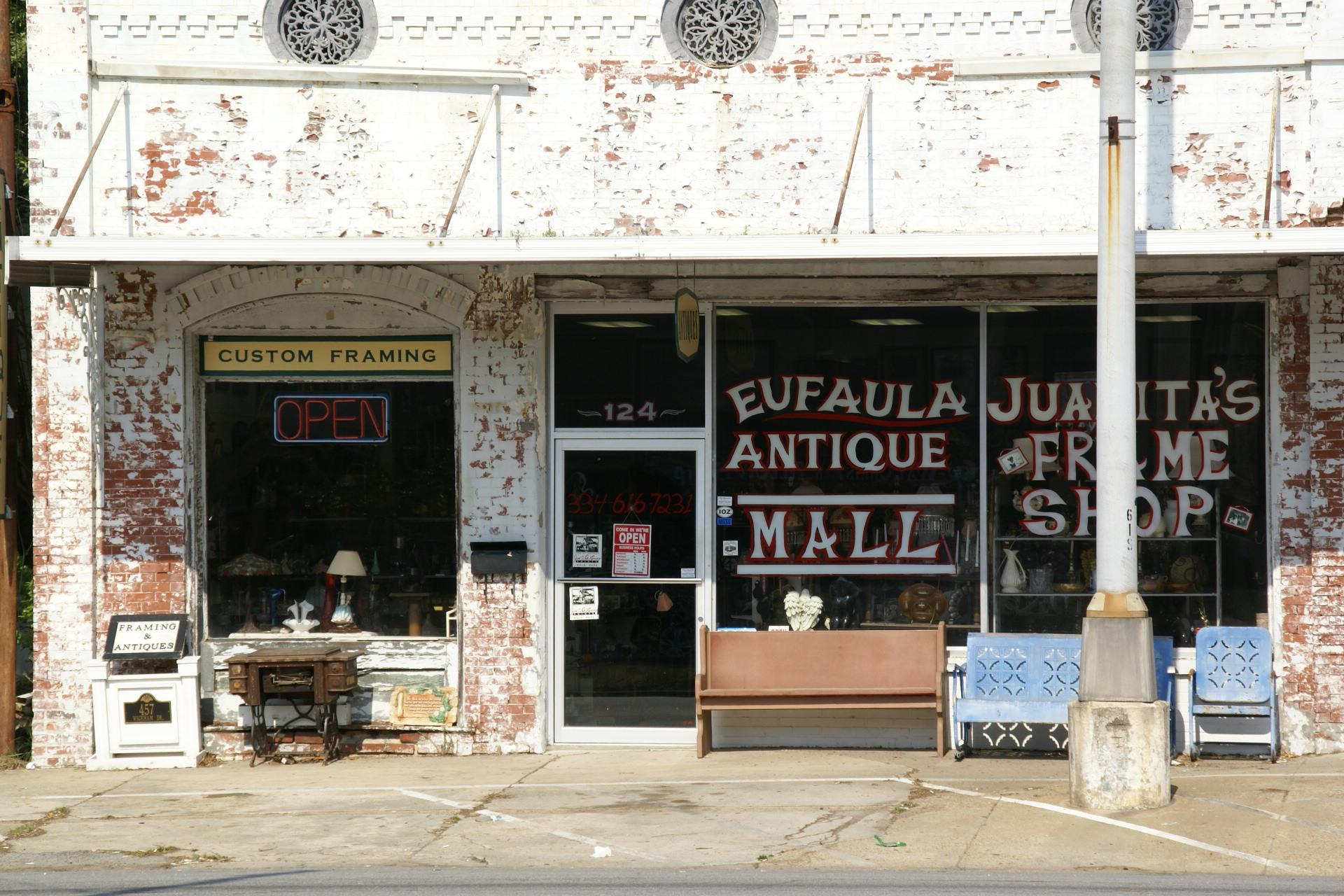

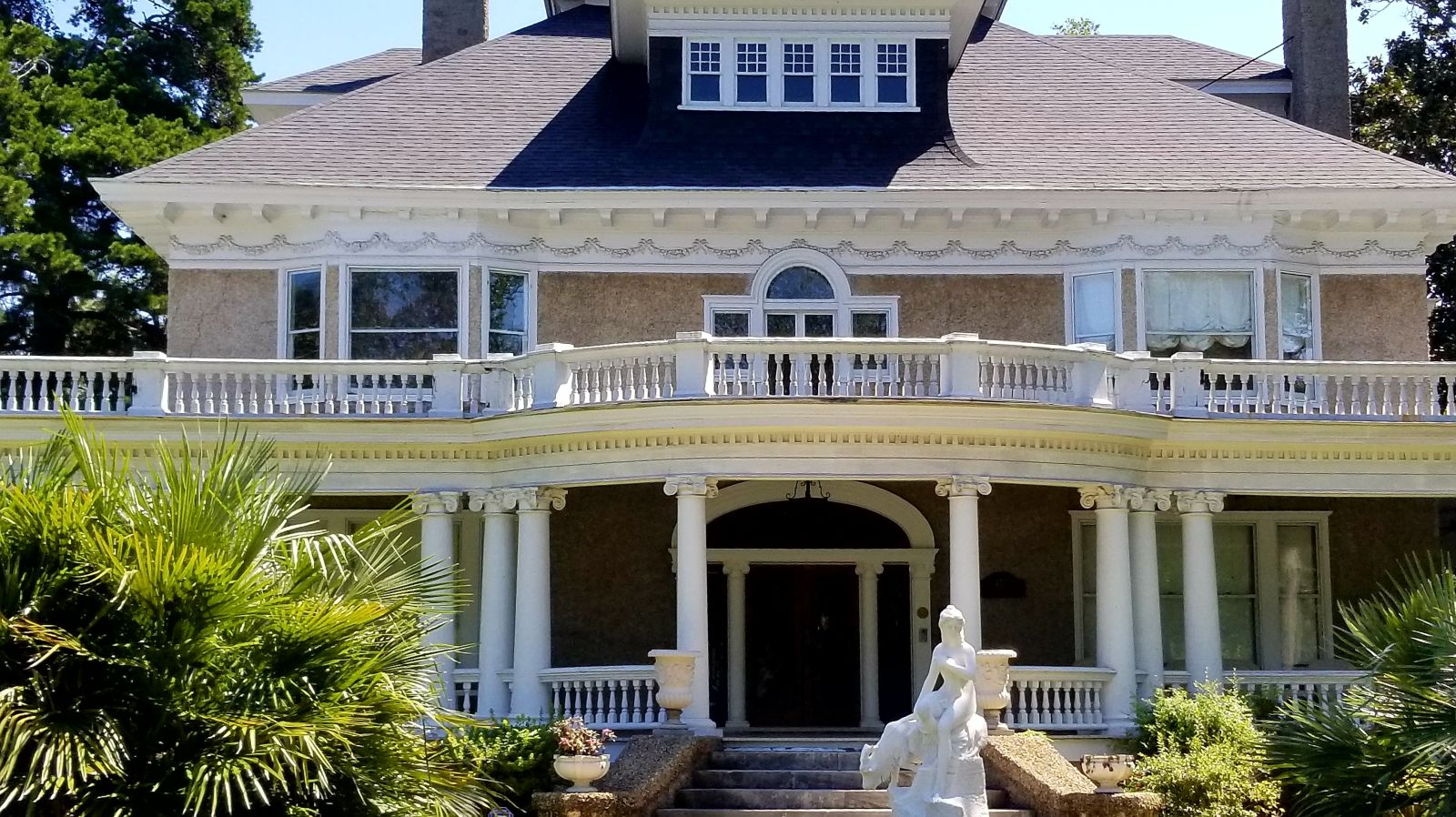
Russell-Flournoy-Houghton House

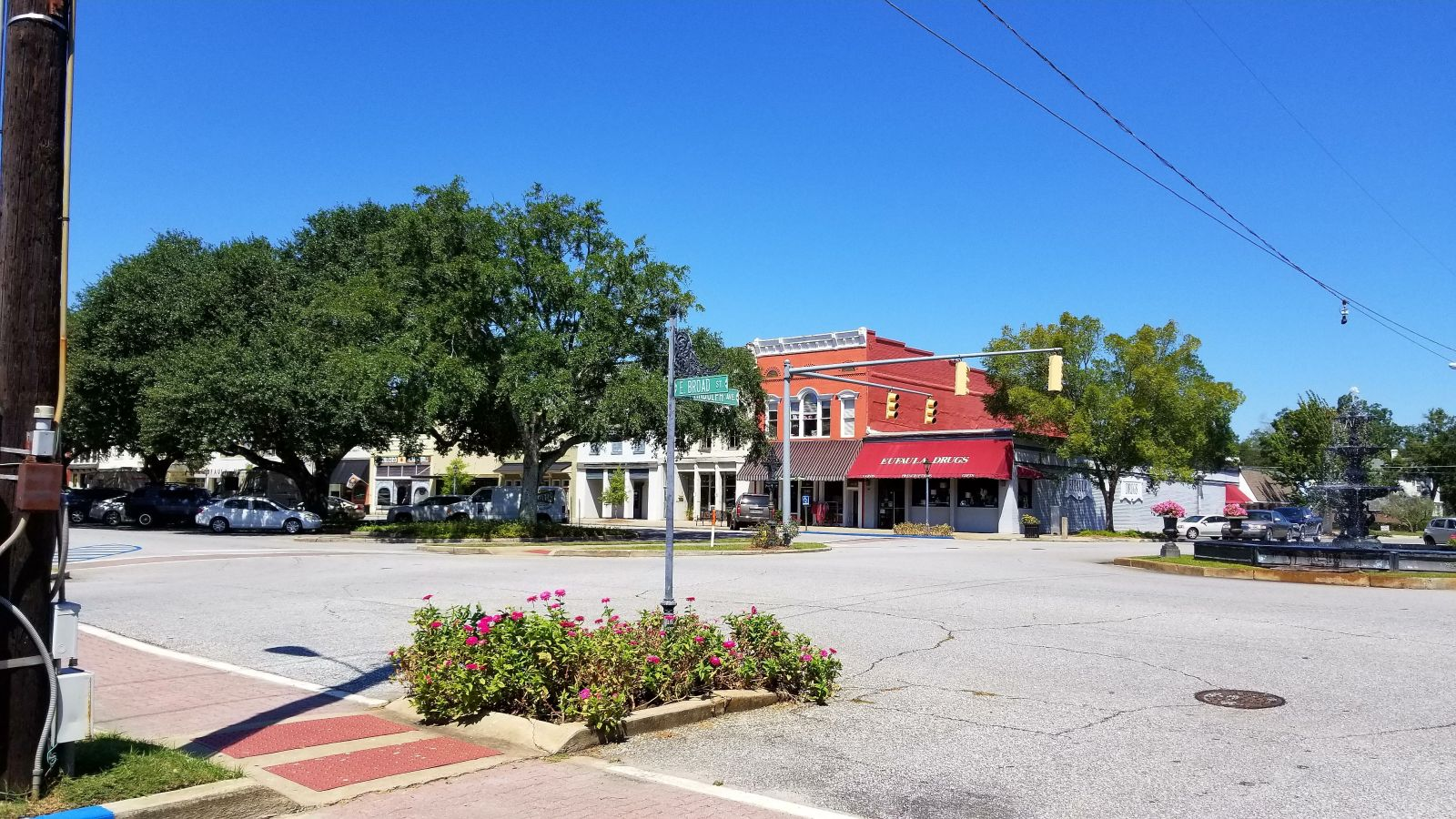
East Broad Street Businesses

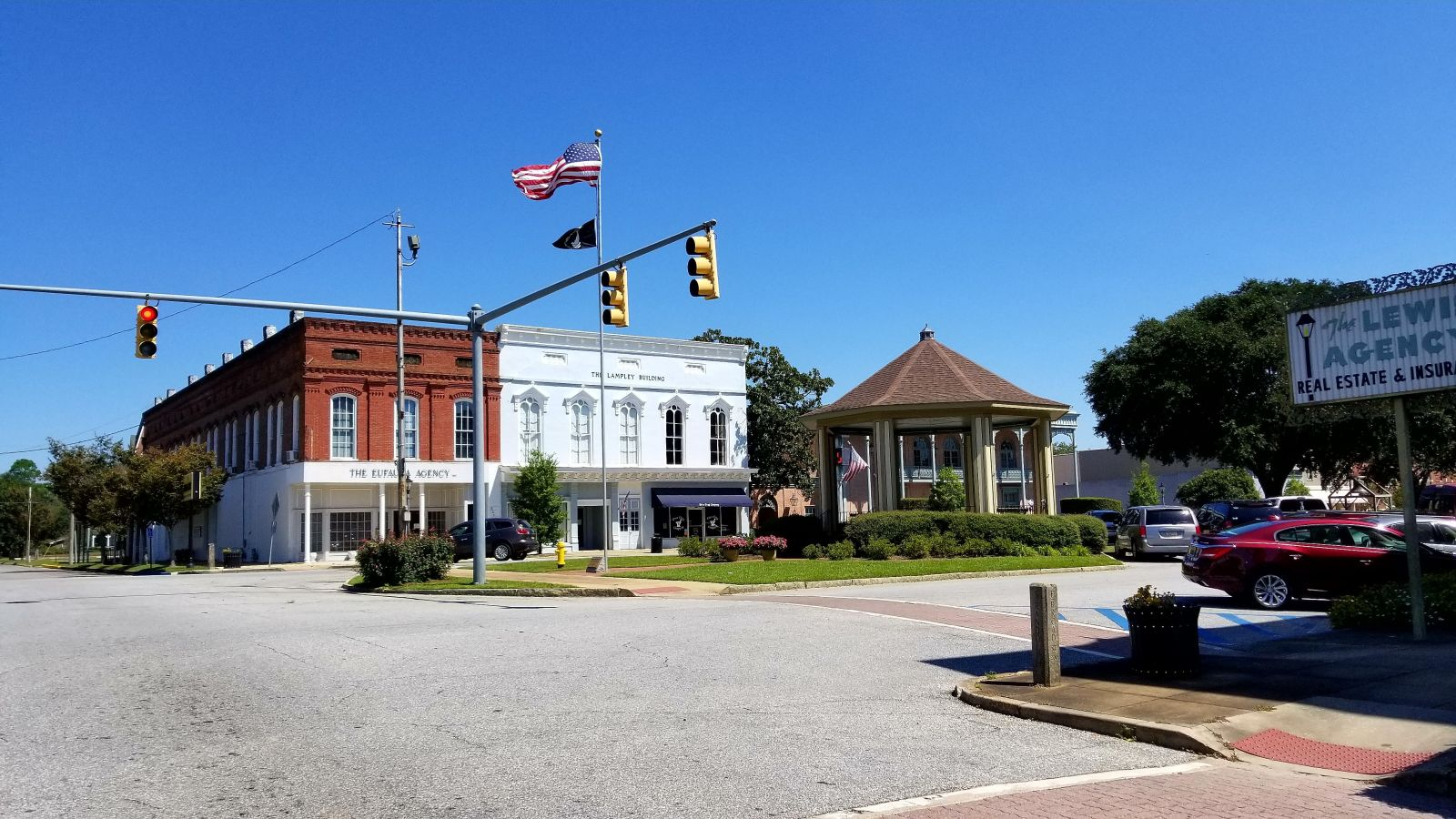
East Broad Street Businesses

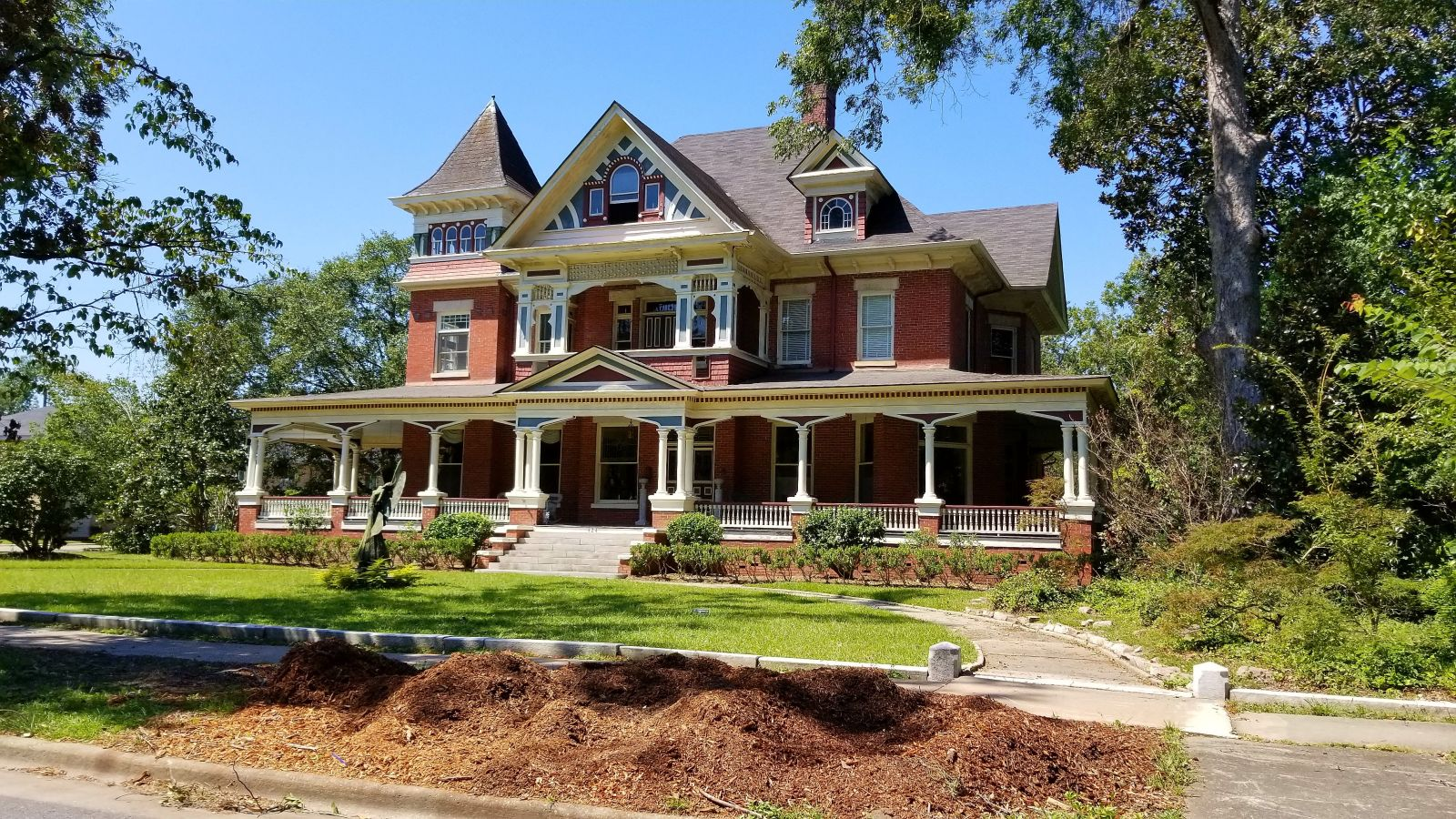
424 N. Eufaula Avenue

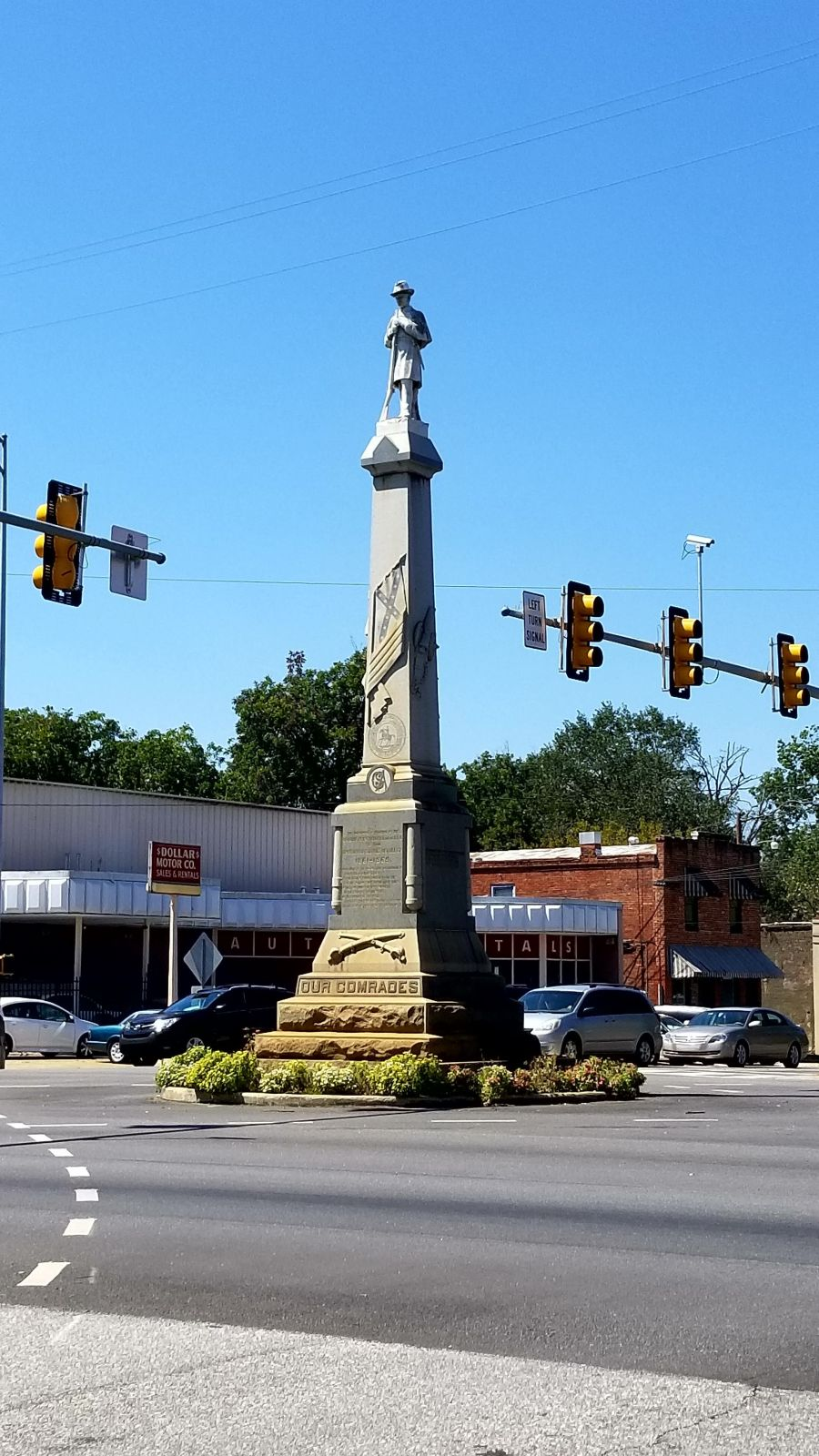
Eufaula Confederate Monument

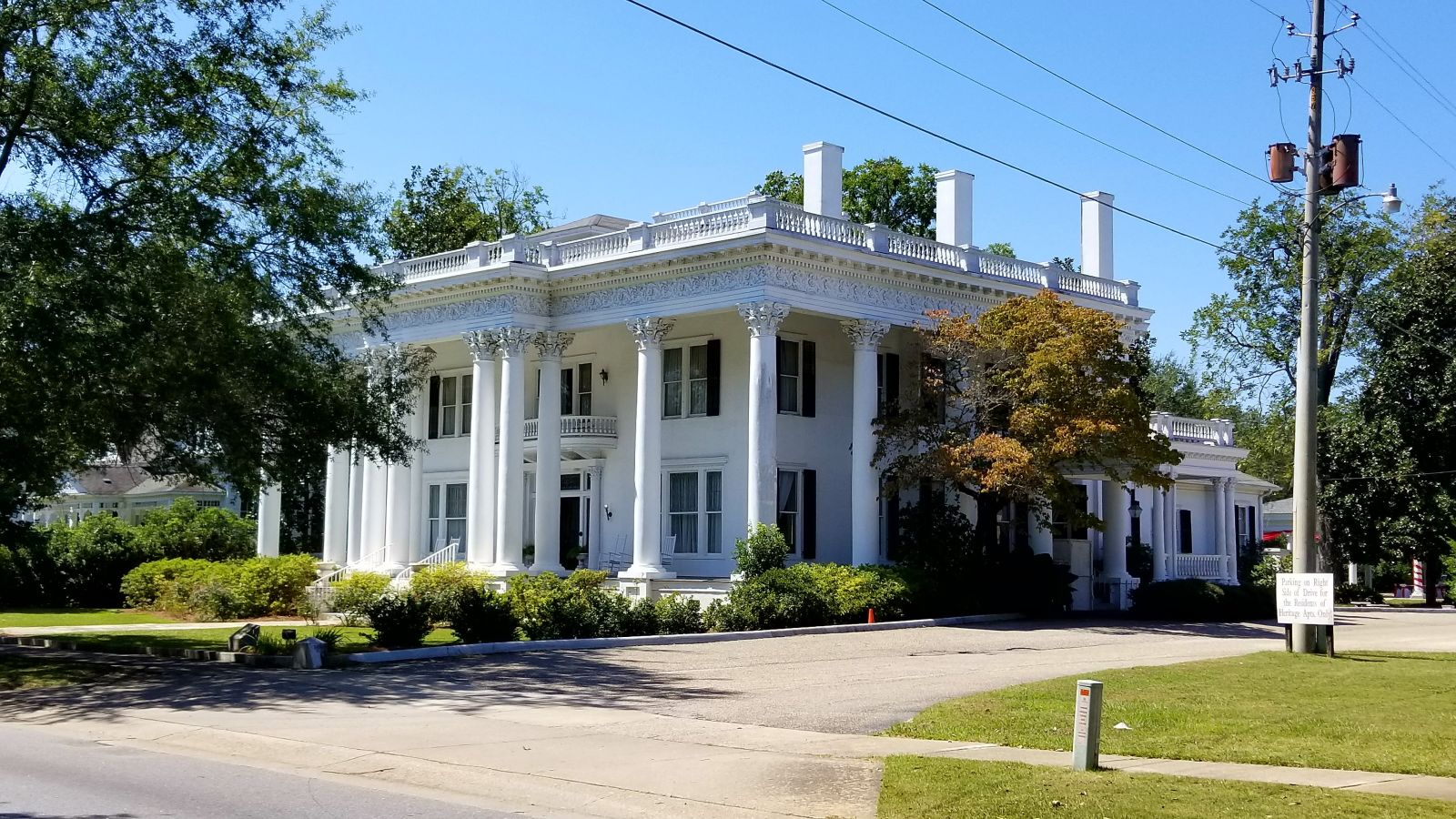
Shorter Mansion

== See also ==
- National Register of Historic Places listings in Barbour County, Alabama
- James L. Pugh
