= East Wetumpka Commercial Historic District =

Historic district in Alabama, United States

- U.S. National Register of Historic Places
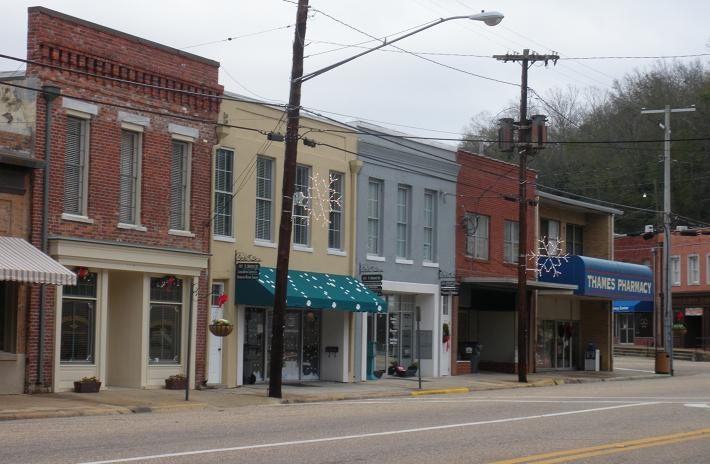

- Location within Alabama
- Interactive map showing the location of East Wetumpka Commercial Historic District
- Location: Roughly, Company St. from Spring St. to E. Bridge St. and E. Bridge and Commerce Sts. from Main to Hill Sts., Wetumpka, Alabama
- Coordinates: 32°32′16″N 86°12′16″W
- Area: 6 acres (2.4 ha)
- Architectural style: Mid 19th Century Revival, Late 19th and 20th Century Revivals, Commercial
- NRHP reference No.: 92000055
- Added to NRHP: February 20, 1992

The East Wetumpka Commercial Historic District, in Wetumpka, Alabama, United States, is a historic district which was listed on the National Register of Historic Places in 1992. The listing included 25 contributing buildings and 10 non-contributing ones on 6 acres (2.4 ha).

The district includes most of the central business district of Wetumpka. Roughly, it consists of Company Street from Spring Street to East Bridge Street and East Bridge and Commerce Streets from Main to Hill Streets, in Wetumpka.

Among the most important buildings are:

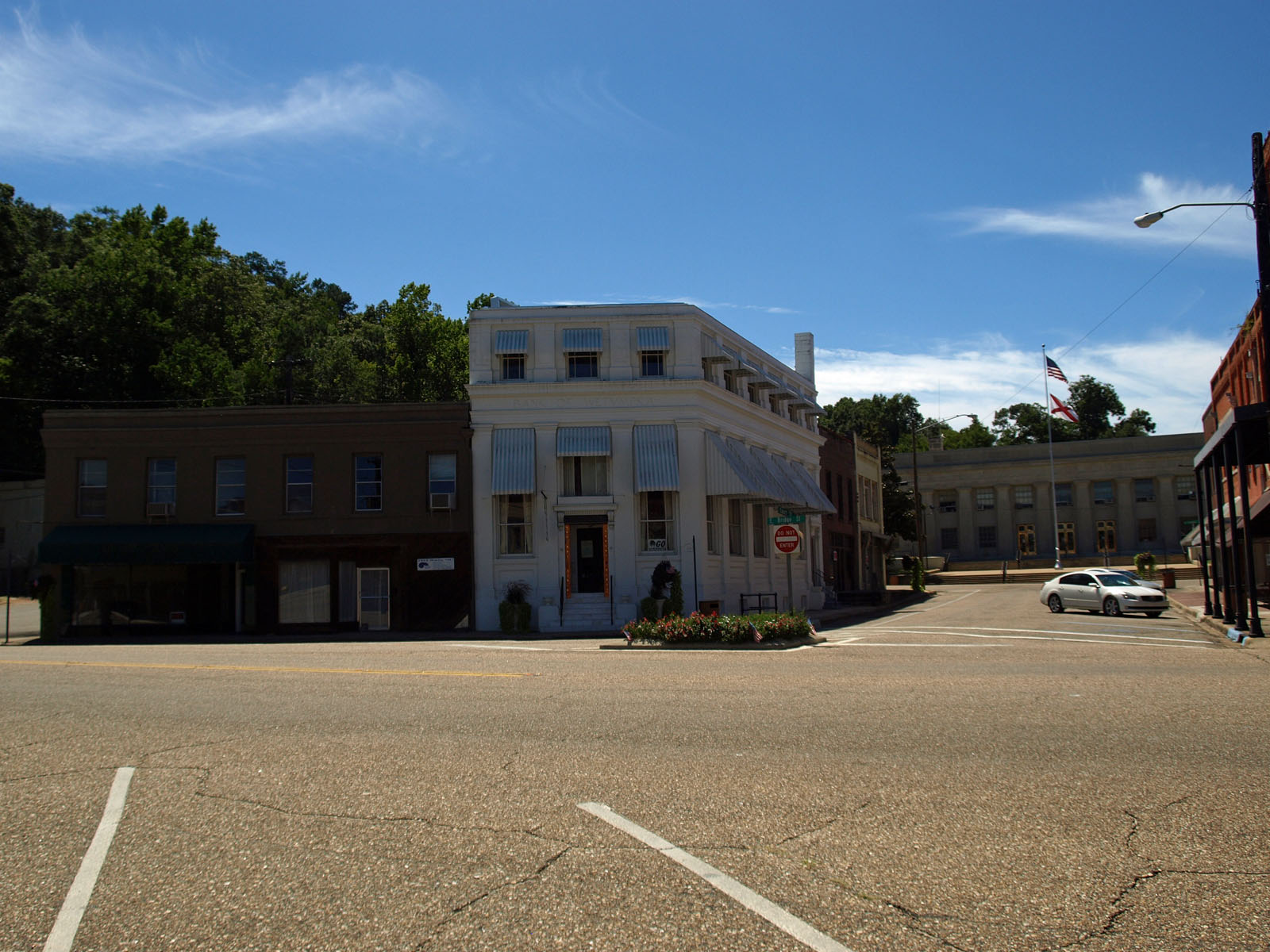
Bank of Wetumpka building

- Bank of Wetumpka building (c.1910), 110 East Bridge Street, a two-story white masonry bank building, with bold vertical-oriented architectural design, one of only two architect-designed buildings in the district, at prominent five-way intersection.

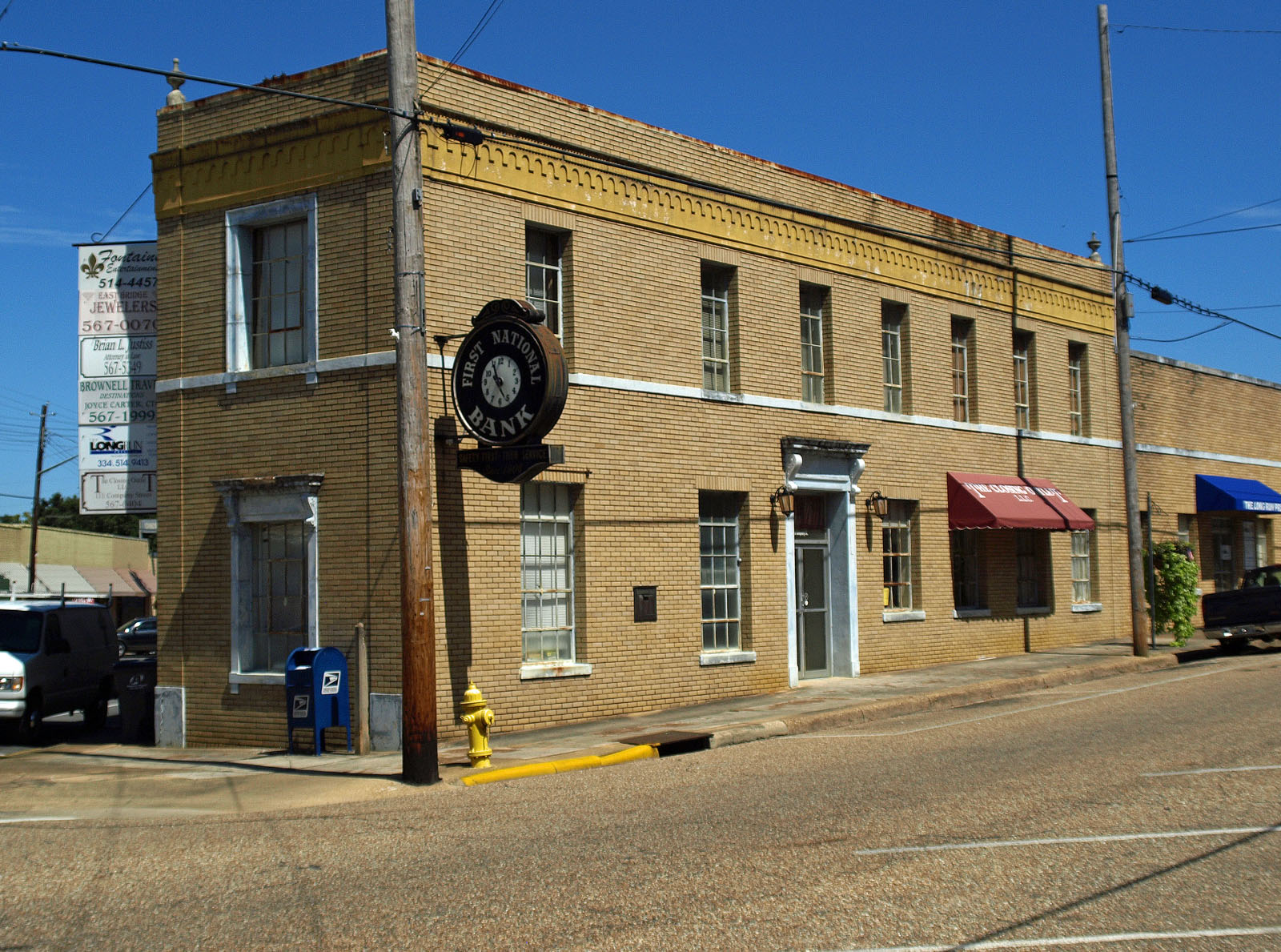
First National Bank building and clock

- First National Bank (c.1910), Company Street, a two-story bank building, triangular (flatiron) in shape, with landmark clock, at same five-way intersection. Pilasters support a wide architrave above the first floor windows, and pattern is repeated, smaller, at second story.
- Lancaster Hotel building (c.1903), 102 Court Street and East Main Street, at same five-way intersection; a three-story hotel

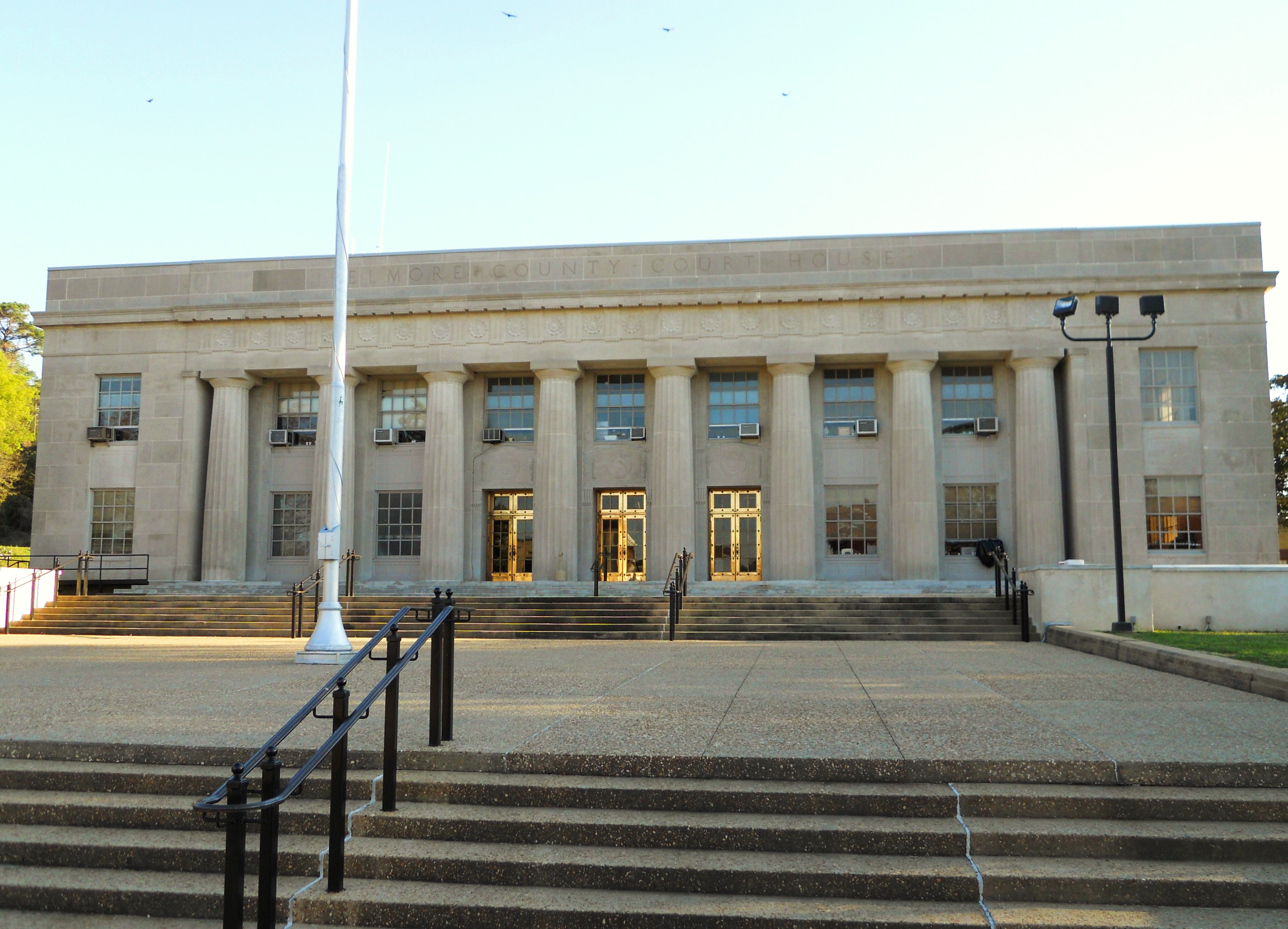
Elmore County Courthouse

- Elmore County Courthouse (1931), Commerce Street. This is a monumental two-story Classical Revival building "with Egyptian Art Deco overtones", the other architect-designed building in the district. It has a central loggia supported by eight massive, fluted columns, and an architrave decorated with modillions and flowerettes.
- 221 Company Street (c.1910), a three-story brick commercial building regarded as a historical social and economic hub of the black community of Wetumpka; it has also been known as the Rose-Geeter Funeral Home.
- Old Jail (c.1820), one-story brick building with small barred windows on three sides, regarded as Wetumpka's first jail.
