= List of mayors of Auburn, Alabama =

Highest elected position in Auburn

Mayor of Auburn
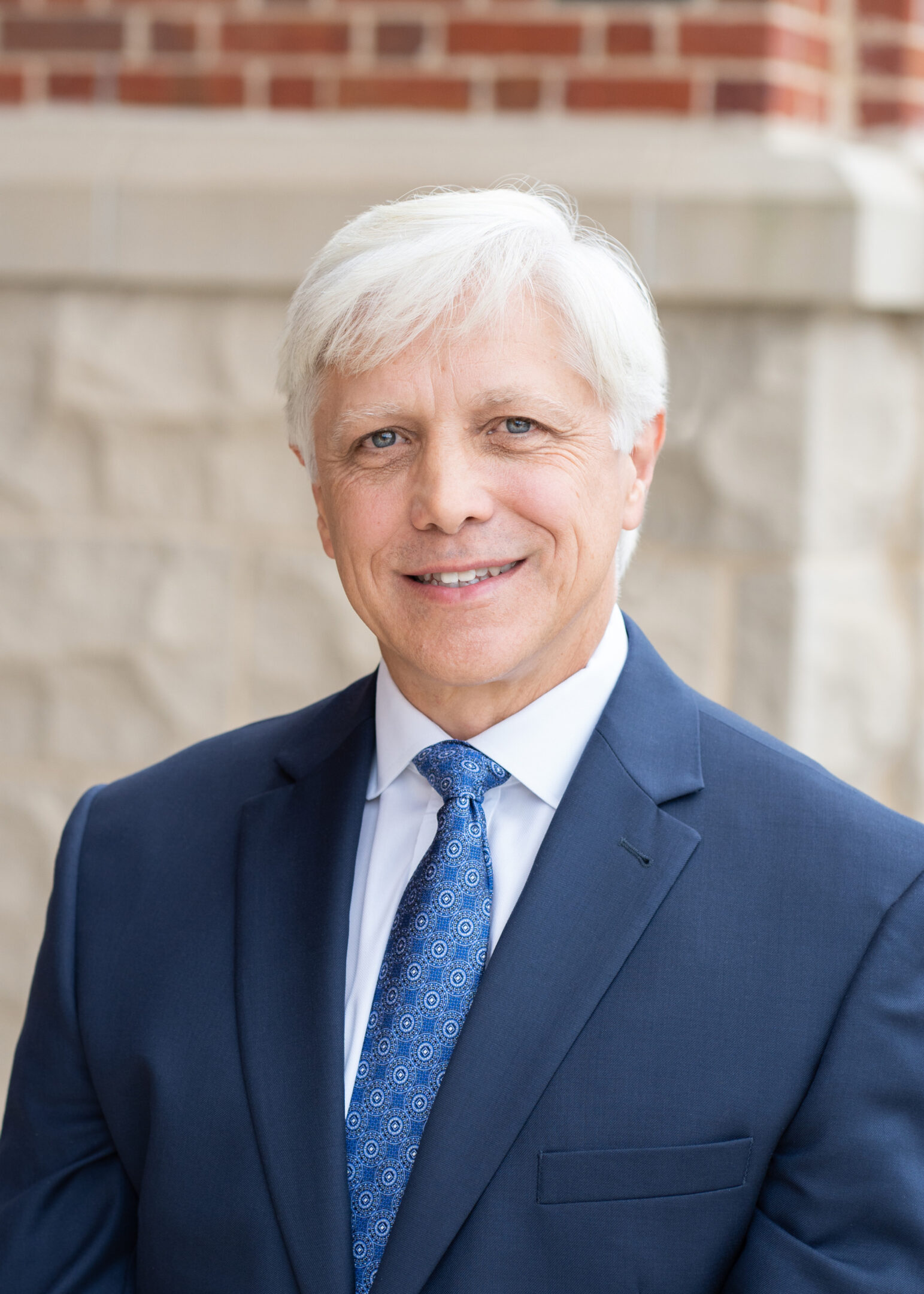
- Incumbent; Ron Anders Jr. since November 5, 2018
- Term length: 4 years
- Formation: 18??
- Salary: $45,000 per year

The Mayor of Auburn is the highest elected position in the city of Auburn, Alabama. The mayor serves as the head of the Auburn City Council, presiding over the meetings, and they are elected in city-wide elections.

== Responsibilities ==
The mayor serves as the chief financial officer of the city, and is required to submit the economic status of the municipality once every six months.

== List ==
Image	Mayor	Term start	Term end	Election	Ref
Unknown
	L. W. Payne	January 1874	Unknown	1874	
Unknown
	Oscar Grout	January 1877	Unknown	1877	
Unknown
	W. B. Frazer	Unknown	Unknown	Unknown	
	W. C. Dowdell	November 1880	Unknown	1880 (special)	
Unknown
	Dr. A. T. Rowe	1882	Unknown	Unknown	
Unknown
	W. S. J. Lampkins	1886	Unknown	Unknown	
	J. W. Harris	1887	(at least 1889)		
Unknown
	T. P. Wimberly	1894	1895	Unknown	
	W. J. S. Lampkins or J. W. Harris	1896	1897	Unknown	
	C. E. Little	1898	1899	Unknown	
	J. W. Harris	1900	1902	Unknown; 1901	
	C. E. Little	1902	1906	Unknown; 1904	
	J. W. Wright	1907	1916	Unknown	
	G. N. Mitcham	1916	March 26, 1918 (Note: Resigned)	Unknown	
	C. S. Yarbrough	March 26, 1918	August 16, 1918	None	
	Sheldon L. Toomer	August 16, 1918	October 7, 1918	None	
	J. W. Wright	October 7, 1918	1922	Unknown	
	C. S. Yarbrough	September 29, 1922	1928		
	W. D. Copeland	1928	1936		
	C. S. Yarbrough	1936	1944		
	G. H. Wright	1944	1954		
	Louie W. James	1955	1956		
	G. H. Wright	1956	1960		
	Louie W. James	1961	1963		
	G. H. Wright	1964	1968		
	James K. Haygood Jr.	1968	1976	1968; 1972	
	Donald E. Hayhurst	1976	1980	1976	
	Jan Dempsey	1980	1998	1980; 1982; 1984; 1986; 1990; 1994	
	Bill Ham Jr.	1998	November 5, 2018	1998; 2002; 2006; 2010; 2014	
	Ron Anders Jr.	November 5, 2018	Incumbent	2018; 2022	
