= Municipal elections in Auburn, Alabama =

Auburn, Alabama municipal elections are held every four years to elect the mayor of the city and members of the city council. A runoff election is held if no candidate receives a majority of the votes, in both mayoral and city council elections.

== Electoral system ==
Auburn uses a runoff electoral system. Prior to 1956, council members were voted on citywide, before wards were drawn for the city.

== 1901 ==
The 1901 election took place on January 5, 1901.

=== Mayoral ===
1901 Auburn, Alabama mayoral election
- January 5, 1901
Candidate	J. W. Harris
Party	Nonpartisan
Popular vote	48
Percentage	100.0%
Mayor before election
J. W. Harris
Elected mayor
J. W. Harris

Incumbent mayor J. W. Harris was elected unopposed.

1901 Auburn, Alabama city council election
Candidate	Votes	%
J. W. Harris	48	100.00
Total votes	48	100.00

=== City council elections ===
1901 Auburn, Alabama city council election
Candidate	Votes	%
RW Burton	48	100.00
J. a. Flanagan	48	100.00
C. E. Little	48	100.00
S. L. Toomer	47	97.92
Total votes	48	100.00

== 1904 ==
The 1904 election was held on January 2, 1904.

=== Mayoral election ===
C. E. Little was elected mayor.

=== City council elections ===
The following people were elected to the city council:

- J. a. Flanagan
- W. O. Bulter
- R. W. Burton
- J. W. Harris

== 1920 ==
=== Mayoral ===
Incumbent mayor Dr. Cecil S. Yarbrough was elected unopposed.

== 1922 ==
=== Mayoral ===
Incumbent mayor Dr. Cecil S. Yarbrough was elected unopposed.

== 1924 ==
=== Mayoral ===
Incumbent mayor Dr. Cecil S. Yarbrough defeated J. W. Wright and was re-elected.

== 1926 ==
The 1926 election took place in September 1926.

=== Mayoral ===
Incumbent mayor Dr. Cecil S. Yarbrough was re-elected to a fifth consecutive term.

=== City council elections ===
The following people were elected to the city council:

- H. W. Wright
- W. D. Martin
- A. L. Thomas
- Dr. B. B. Ross
- C. F. Little

== 1928 ==
The 1928 election took place on September 17, 1928.

=== Mayoral ===
1928 Auburn, Alabama mayoral election
- September 17, 1928
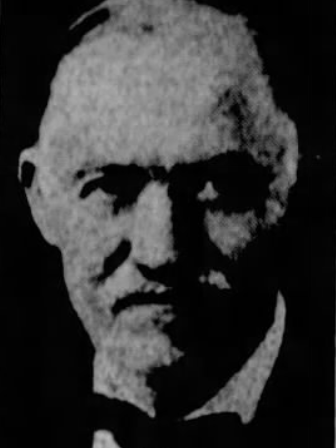

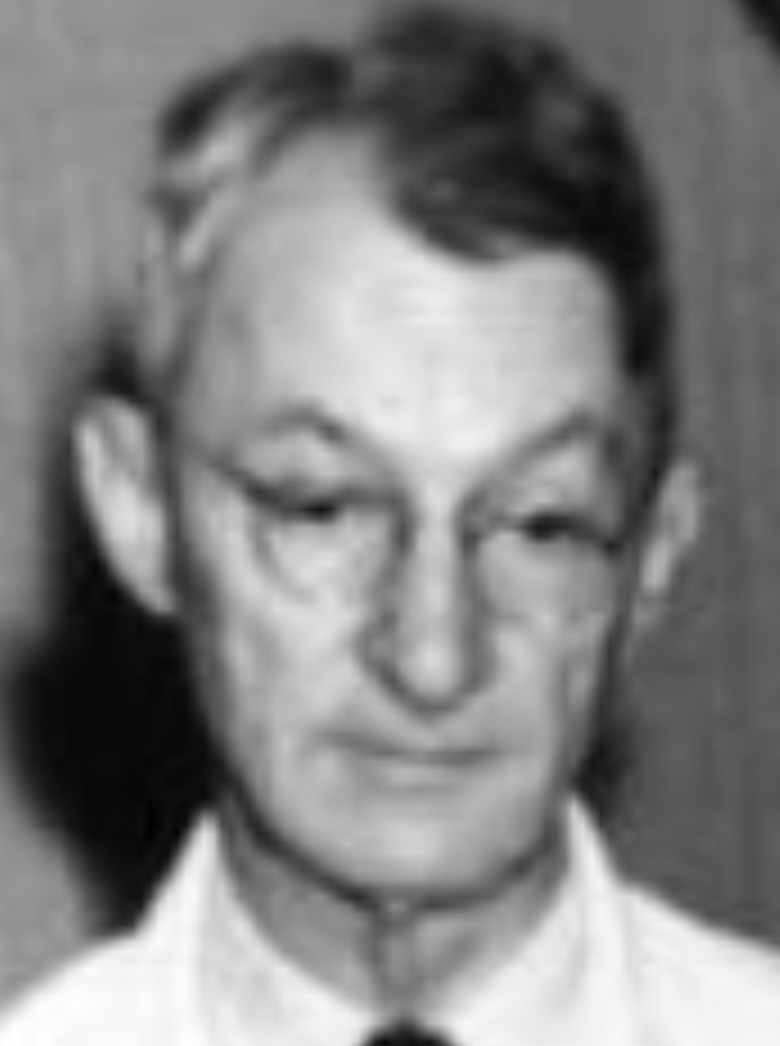
Candidate	W. D. Copeland	Cecil S. Yarbrough
Party	Nonpartisan	Nonpartisan
Popular vote	165	142
Percentage	53.7%	47.3%
Mayor before election
Cecil S. Yarbrough
Elected mayor
W. D. Copeland

W. D. Copeland defeated incumbent Cecil S. Yarbrough.

1928 Auburn, Alabama mayoral election
Candidate	Votes	%
W. D. Copeland	165	53.75
Cecil S. Yarbrough	142	47.25
Total votes	307	100.00

=== City council election ===
All five members were elected city-wide, with voters selecting five.

1928 Auburn, Alabama city council election
Candidate	Votes	%
C. F. Little	267	18.59
Wright	258	17.97
W. D. Martin	239	16.64
B. B. Ross	231	16.09
J. C. Grimes	226	15.74
A. L. Thomas	215	14.97
Total votes	1,436	100.00

== 1932 ==
The 1932 election was held in September 1932.

=== Mayoral ===
1932 Auburn, Alabama mayoral election
- September 1932
Candidate	W. D. Copeland
Party	Nonpartisan
Popular vote	Unopposed
Mayor before election
W. D. Copeland
Elected mayor
W. D. Copeland

Incumbent W. D. Copeland was elected unopposed.

=== City council elections ===
The following people were elected to the city council:

- J. C. Grimes
- W. D. Martin
- Homer Wright
- H. M. Martin
- A. Meadows

== 1936 ==
The 1936 election was held in September 1936.

=== Mayoral ===
1936 Auburn, Alabama mayoral election
- September 1936
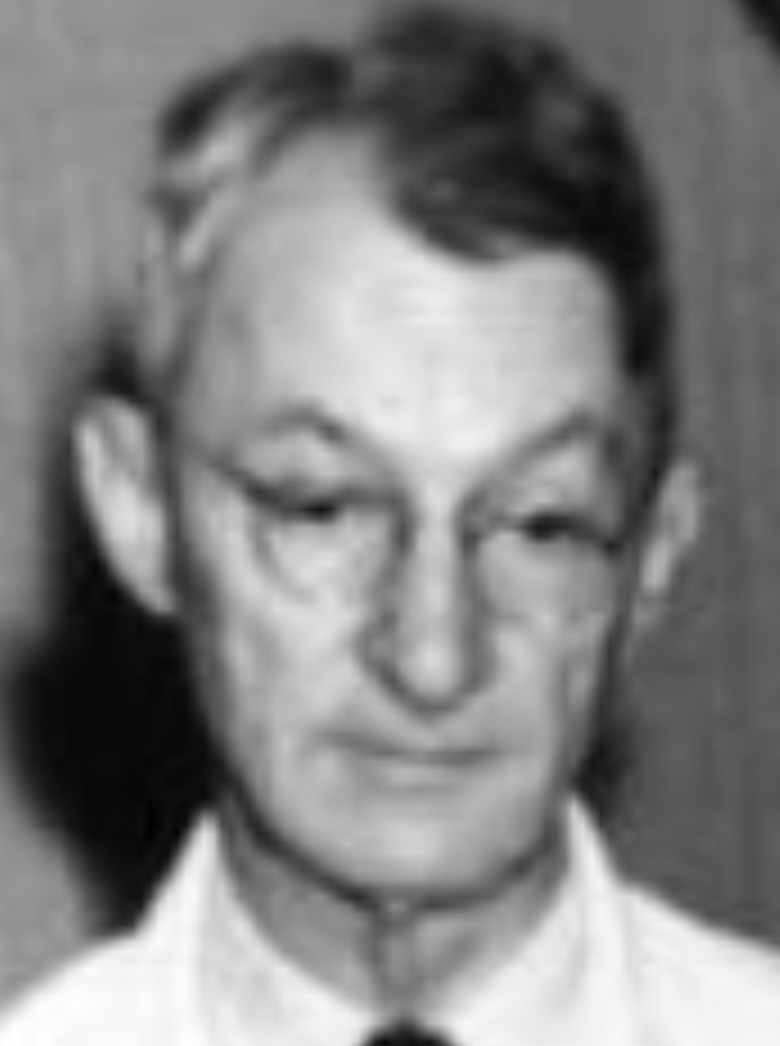

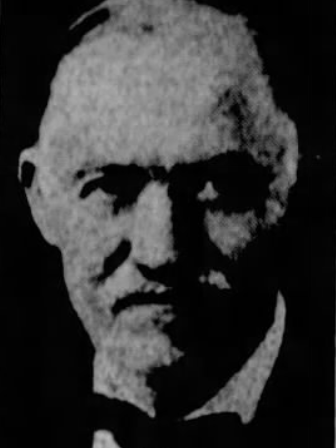
Candidate	Cecil S. Yarbrough	W. D. Copeland
Party	Nonpartisan	Nonpartisan
Popular vote	237	17
Percentage	93.3%	6.7%
Mayor before election
W. D. Copeland
Elected mayor
Cecil S. Yarbrough

1936 Auburn, Alabama mayoral election
Candidate	Votes	%
Cecil S. Yarbrough	237	93.3%
W. D. Copeland	17	6.7%
Total votes	254	100.0%

=== City council elections ===
The following people were elected as councilmen:

- A. Meadows
- J. C. Grimes
- W. D. Martin
- Herbert M. Martin
- W. L. Long

== 1940 ==
The 1940 election was held on September 16, 1940.

=== Mayoral ===
1940 Auburn, Alabama mayoral election
- September 16, 1940
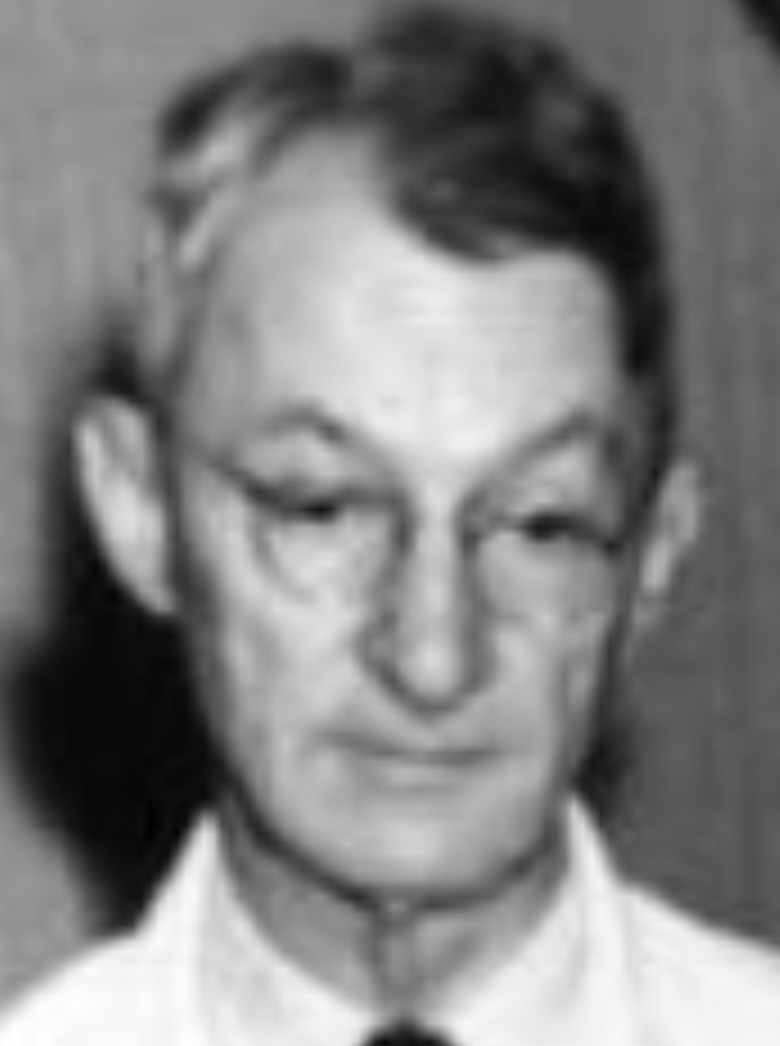
Candidate	Cecil S. Yarbrough
Party	Nonpartisan
Popular vote	396
Percentage	100.0%
Mayor before election
Cecil S. Yarbrough
Elected mayor
Cecil S. Yarbrough

1940 Auburn, Alabama mayoral election
Candidate	Votes	%
Cecil S. Yarbrough	396	100.00
Total votes	396	100.0%

=== City council elections ===
==== Place 1 ====
1940 Auburn, Alabama municipal election — Place 1
Candidate	Votes	%
A. Meadows	393	100.00
Total votes	393	100.00

==== Place 2 ====
1940 Auburn, Alabama municipal election — Place 2
Candidate	Votes	%
W. L. Long	391	100.00
Total votes	391	100.00

==== Place 3 ====
1940 Auburn, Alabama municipal election — Place 2
Candidate	Votes	%
Emil F. Wright	392	100.00
Total votes	392	100.00

==== Place 4 ====
1940 Auburn, Alabama municipal election — Place 4
Candidate	Votes	%
George M. Bayne	260	59.09
Roberts H. Brown	180	40.91
Total votes	440	100.00

==== Place 5 ====
1940 Auburn, Alabama municipal election — Place 5
Candidate	Votes	%
George H. Wright	285	65.67
Harvey C. Pitts	149	34.33
Total votes	434	100.00

== 1944 ==
The 1944 election was held on September 17, 1944.

=== Mayoral election ===
1944 Auburn, Alabama mayoral election
- September 17, 1944
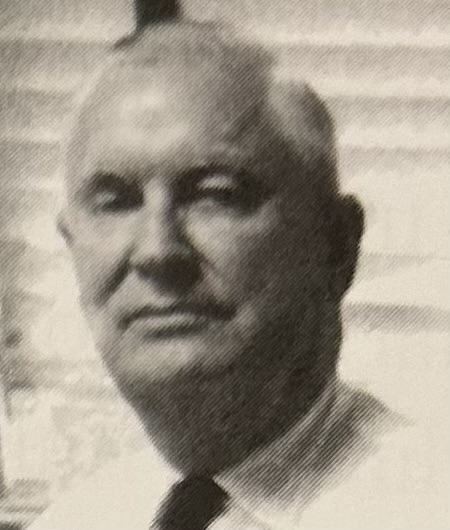

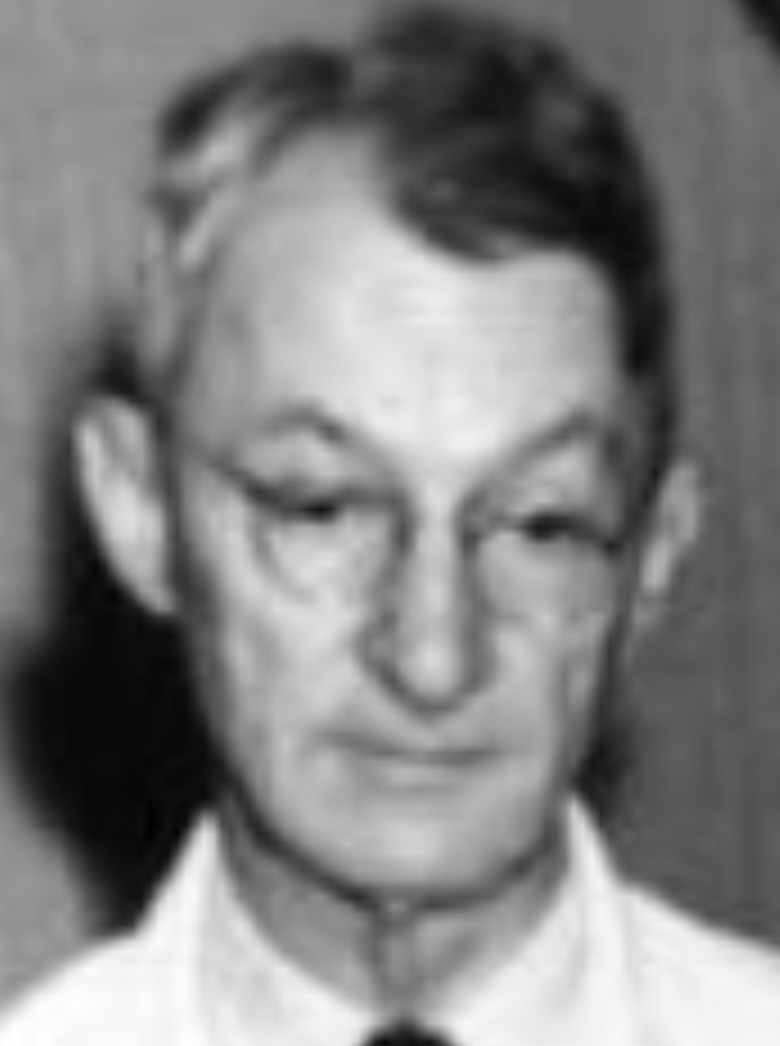
Candidate	G. H. Wright	Cecil S. Yarbrough
Party	Nonpartisan	Nonpartisan
Popular vote	281	253
Percentage	52.6%	47.4%
Mayor before election
C. S. Yarbrough
Elected mayor
G. H. Wright

G. H. Wright was elected mayor.

1944 Auburn, Alabama mayoral election
Candidate	Votes	%
G. H. Wright	281	52.62
C. S. Yarbrough	253	47.38
Total votes	534	100.00

=== City council elections ===
==== Place 1 ====
1944 Auburn, Alabama city council election — Place 1
Candidate	Votes	%
A. Meadows	424	100.00
Total votes	424	100.00

==== Place 2 ====
1944 Auburn, Alabama city council election — Place 2
Candidate	Votes	%
W. L. Long	417	100.00
Total votes	417	100.00

==== Place 3 ====
1944 Auburn, Alabama city council election — Place 3
Candidate	Votes	%
Emil F. Wright	406	100.00
Total votes	406	100.00

==== Place 4 ====
1944 Auburn, Alabama city council election — Place 4
Candidate	Votes	%
George M. Bayne	393	100.00
Total votes	393	100.00

==== Place 5 ====
1944 Auburn, Alabama city council election — Place 5
Candidate	Votes	%
J. C. Grimes	338	63.77
B. C. Pope	192	36.23
Total votes	530	100.00

== 1956 ==
The 1956 election was held on September 17, 1956.

=== Mayoral election ===
1956 Auburn, Alabama mayoral election
- September 17, 1956
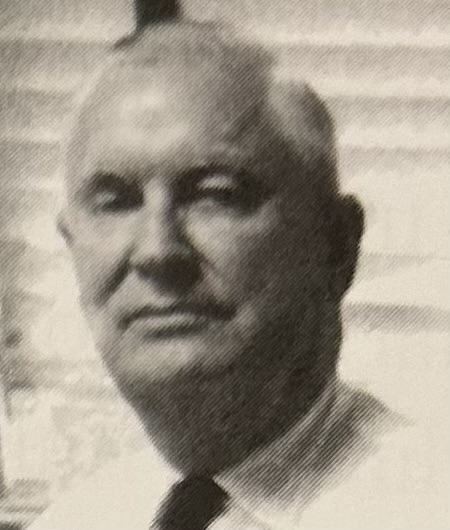

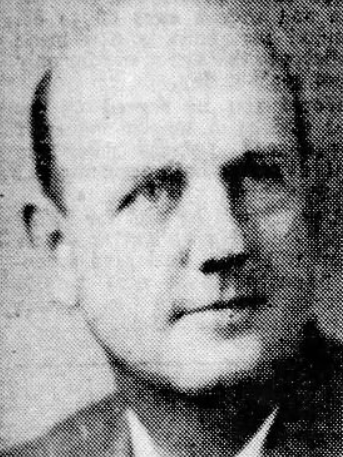

Candidate	G. H. Wright	Louie W. James	J. G. Hitchcock
Party	Nonpartisan	Nonpartisan	Nonpartisan
Popular vote	630	588	374
Percentage	39.6%	36.9%	23.5%
Mayor before election
Louie W. James
Elected mayor
G. H. Wright

1956 Auburn, Alabama mayoral election
Candidate	Votes	%
G. H. Wright	630	39.57
Louie W. James	588	36.93
J. G. Hitchcock	374	23.49
Total votes	1,592	100.00

=== City council elections ===
Each ward elected two members, and voters selected two candidates on their ballots.

==== City council president ====
1956 Auburn, Alabama city council president election
Candidate	Votes	%
W. T. Ingram	994	62.75
Pete B. Turnham	590	37.25
Total votes	1,584	100.00

==== First ward ====
1956 Auburn, Alabama city council election — First ward
Candidate	Votes	%
Cleveland L. Davis	1,126	36.89
M. D. Guthery	977	32.01
Frank B. Davis	949	31.09
Total votes	3,052	100.00

==== Second ward ====
1956 Auburn, Alabama city council election — Second ward
Candidate	Votes	%
Mrs. K. B. Roy	1,045	34.11
C. R. Meagher	1,043	34.05
A. C. Hamilton	669	21.84
A. G. Marsh	306	9.99
Total votes	3,063	100.00

==== Third ward ====
1956 Auburn, Alabama city council election — Third ward
Candidate	Votes	%
W. D. Wittel	1,332	43.79
Mrs. J. T. Williamson	891	29.29
Jack M. Dunlop	819	26.92
Total votes	3,042	100.00

==== Fourth ward ====
1956 Auburn, Alabama city council election — Fourth ward
Candidate	Votes	%
W. H. Weidenbach	878	28.31
Marvin D. Meadows	617	19.90
Charles DeBardeleben	548	17.67
Mrs. Jack T. May	443	14.29
Vernon W. Lapp	418	13.48
Robert T. Collins	197	6.35
Total votes	3,101	100.00

== 1961 ==
An election was held in 1961. Louie W. James served as mayor from 1961 to 1963.

== 1964 ==
The 1964 election was held on August 11, 1964. Runoffs were held on September 15, 1964.

== 1968 ==
The 1968 election took place on 13 August 1968, with runoffs taking place on 10 September 1968.

=== Mayoral ===
1968 Auburn, Alabama mayoral election
- 13 August 1968
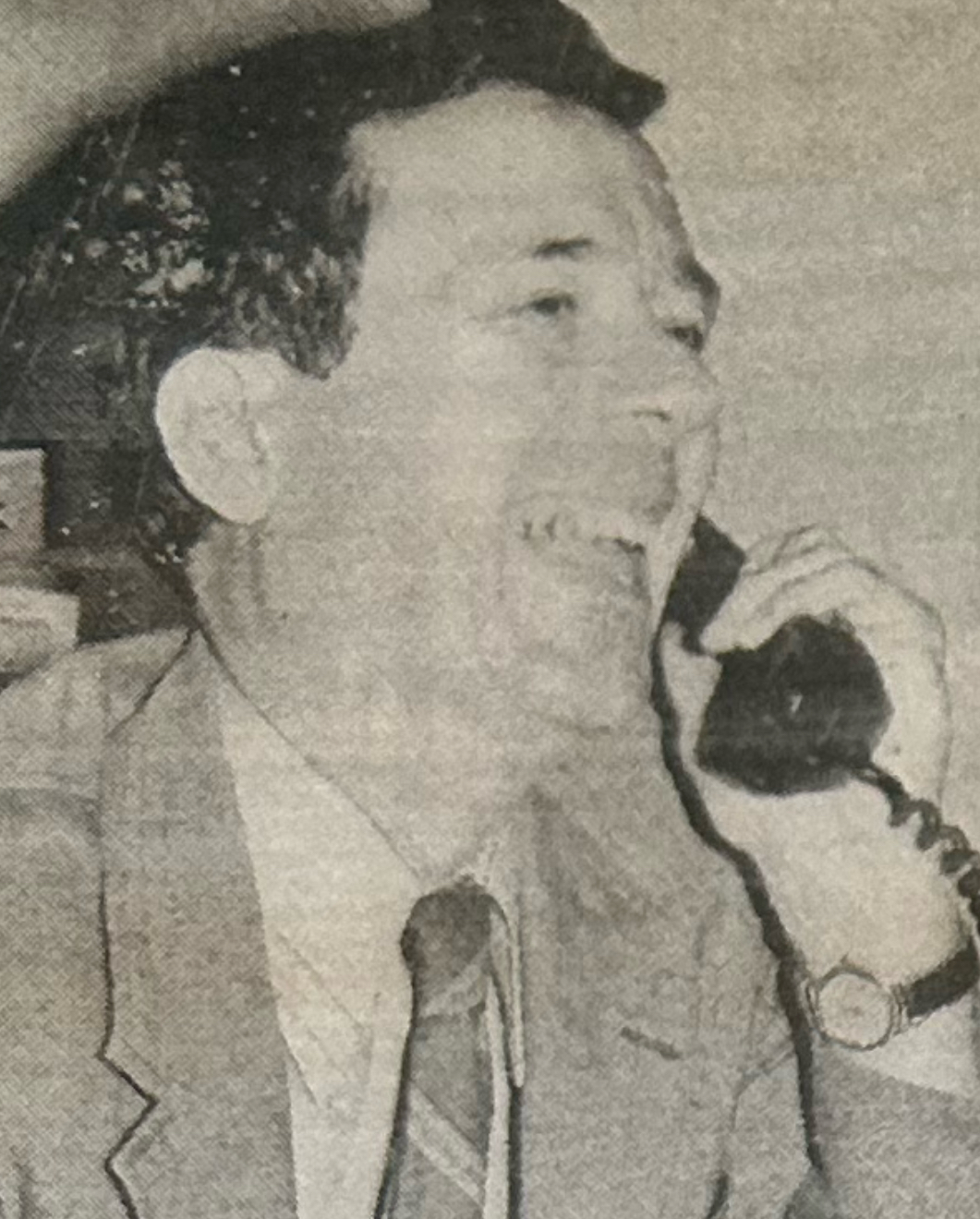

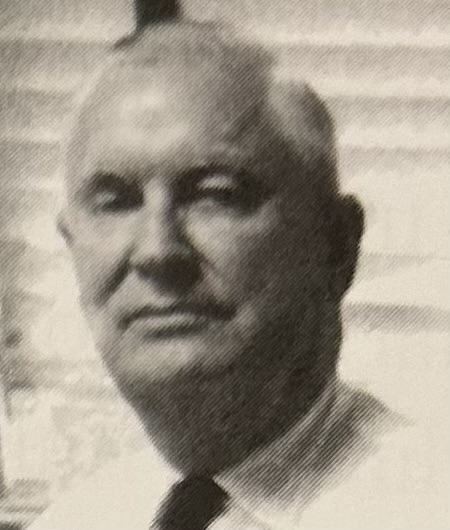

Candidate	James K. Haygood Jr.	G. H. Wright	Kenneth Roy
Party	Nonpartisan	Nonpartisan	Nonpartisan
Popular vote	1,371	719	585
Percentage	51.3%	26.9%	21.8%
Mayor before election
G. H. Wright
Elected mayor
James K. Haygood Jr.

James K. Haygood Jr. defeated incumbent G.H. Wright.

1968 Auburn, Alabama mayoral election
Candidate	Votes	%
James K. Haygood Jr.	1,371	51.25
G. H. Wright	719	26.88
Kenneth Roy	585	21.87
Total votes	2,675	100.0%

=== City council elections ===
==== City council president ====
1968 Auburn, Alabama city council presidential election
Candidate	Votes	%
Dan Hollis	1,309	55.2%
William S. Smith	1,064	44.8%
Total votes	2,373	100.0%

== 1972 ==
The 1972 election was held on 8 August 1972. Runoffs were held on 12 September 1972.

=== Mayoral ===
1972 Auburn, Alabama mayoral election
- 12 September 1972
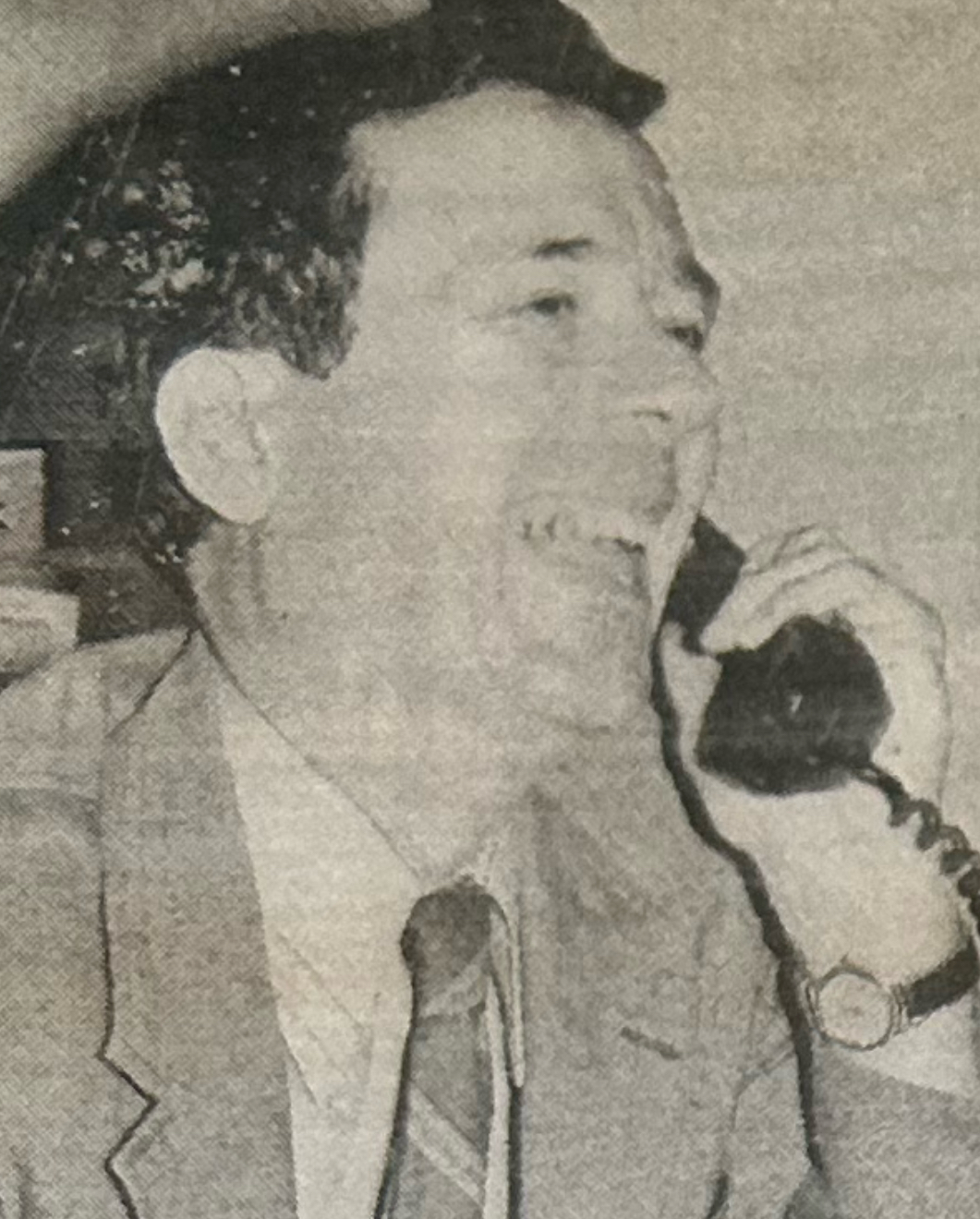

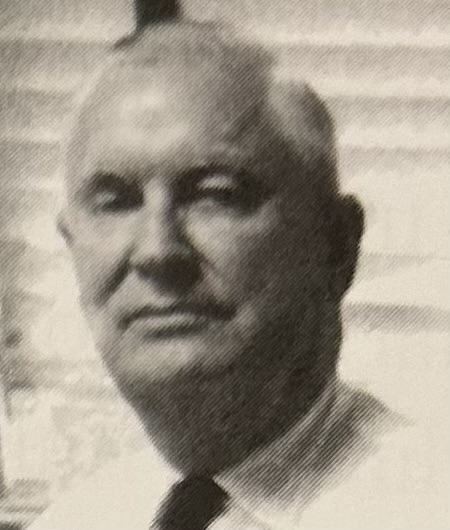
Candidate	James K. Haygood Jr.	G. H. Wright
Party	Nonpartisan	Nonpartisan
Popular vote	1,950	1,709
Percentage	53.3%	46.7%
Mayor before election
James K. Haygood Jr.
Elected mayor
James K. Haygood Jr.

1972 Auburn, Alabama mayoral election
Candidate	Votes	%
James K. Haygood Jr.	1,190	34.0%
G. H. Wright	1,062	30.3%
Robert G. Robel	500	14.3%
John F. Dunlap	469	13.4%
John Peavy Wright	282	8.1%
Total votes	3,503	100.0%

==== Runoff ====
James K. Haygood Jr. won the runoff election, and was elected to his second term.

1972 Auburn, Alabama mayoral election runoff
Candidate	Votes	%
James K. Haygood Jr.	1,950	53.3%
G.H. Wright	1,709	46.7%
Total votes	3,659	100.0%

=== City council elections ===
==== City council president ====
1972 Auburn, Alabama city council presidential election
Candidate	Votes	%
Eugene E. Stanaland	1,361	40.0%
Andrew J. Gentry Jr.	1,175	34.3%
Fred H. Pumphrey	469	13.7%
Hugh D. Reagan	363	10.6%
Joe L. Reid	58	1.7%
Total votes	3,426	100.0%

===== Runoff =====
Eugene E. Stanaland won the runoff over Andrew J. Gentry Jr.

1972 Auburn, Alabama city council presidential election runoff
Candidate	Votes	%
Eugene E. Stanaland	2,041	56.5%
Andrew J. Gentry Jr.	1,571	43.5%
Total votes	3,612	100.0%

==== Ward 1, Place 1 ====
1972 Auburn, Alabama municipal election — Ward 1, Place 1
Candidate	Votes	%
Herman D. Alexander	370	36.0%
Lindburgh Jackson	241	23.4%
Thomas E. Jones	229	22.3%
Frances L. Porter	189	18.4%
Total votes	1,029	100.0%

===== Runoff =====
1972 Auburn, Alabama municipal election — Ward 1, Place 1 runoff
Candidate	Votes	%
Herman D. Alexander	629	55.1%
Lindburgh Jackson	513	44.9%
Total votes	1,142	100.0%

==== Ward 1, Place 2 ====
1972 Auburn, Alabama municipal election — Ward 1, Place 2
Candidate	Votes	%
Mary E. Brooks	415	40.3%
Wiley C. Johnson	354	34.4%
Floyd T. Starr Jr.	180	17.5%
James Michael Williams	106	10.3%
Total votes	1,029	100.0%

===== Runoff =====
1972 Auburn, Alabama municipal election — Ward 1, Place 2 runoff
Candidate	Votes	%
Mary E. Brooks	620	52.5%
Wiley C. Johnson	561	47.5%
Total votes	1,181	100.0%

==== Ward 2, Place 1 ====
1972 Auburn, Alabama municipal election — Ward 2, Place 2
Candidate	Votes	%
Cecil M. Yarbrough	160	76.2%
James E. Gaylor	50	23.8%
Total votes	210	100.0%

==== Ward 2, Place 2 ====
1972 Auburn, Alabama municipal election — Ward 2, Place 2
Candidate	Votes	%
Water C. Giddens	207	71.1%
Carroll Jean Mudd	84	28.9%
Total votes	291	100.0%

==== Ward 3, Place 1 ====
Four candidates qualified for the ballot for this seat.

1972 Auburn, Alabama municipal election — Ward 3, Place 1
Candidate	Votes	%
Dewey V. Northcutt	572	46.9%
Allen W. Jones	428	35.1%
C. Wayne Mitcham	203	16.7%
B.F. Bullard	16	1.3%
Total votes	1,219	100.0%

===== Runoff =====
1972 Auburn, Alabama municipal election — Ward 3, Place 1 runoff
Candidate	Votes	%
Dewey V. Northcutt	613	52.4%
Allen W. Jones	556	47.6%
Total votes	1,169	100.0%

==== Ward 3, Place 2 ====
Six candidates qualified for the ballot for this seat.

1972 Auburn, Alabama municipal election — Ward 3, Place 2
Candidate	Votes	%
Bruce Herring	302	25.3%
Elsie Timberlake	301	25.3%
Jackie N. Teachworth	275	23.1%
Paul C. Connor	210	17.6%
Vicki Lynn Foshee	63	5.3%
J.W. Hines Jr.	41	3.4%
Total votes	1,192	100.0%

===== Runoff =====
1972 Auburn, Alabama municipal election — Ward 3, Place 2
Candidate	Votes	%
Bruce Herring	712	60.2%
Jackie N. Teachworth	471	39.8%
Total votes	1,183	100.0%

==== Ward 4, Place 1 ====
O. Clyde Prather was unopposed in this seat.

1972 Auburn, Alabama municipal election – Ward 4, Place 1
Candidate	Votes	%
O. Clyde Prather	Unnopposed	100%

==== Ward 4, Place 2 ====
Three candidates qualified for the ballot for this seat. The top two advanced to a runoff.

1972 Auburn, Alabama municipal election — Ward 4, Place 2
Candidate	Votes	%
Raymond Askew	231	45.7%
Claude B. Layfield Jr.	177	35.0%
Frank W. Reeves	98	19.4%
Total votes	506	100.0%

===== Runoff =====
1972 Auburn, Alabama municipal election — Ward 4, Place 2 runoff
Candidate	Votes	%
Raymond Askew	494	55.4%
Claude Layfield	397	44.6%
Total votes	891	100.0%

== 1976 ==
The 1976 election was held on August 10, 1976, with runoffs being held on September 14, 1976.

=== Mayoral ===
1976 Auburn, Alabama mayoral election
- September 14, 1976
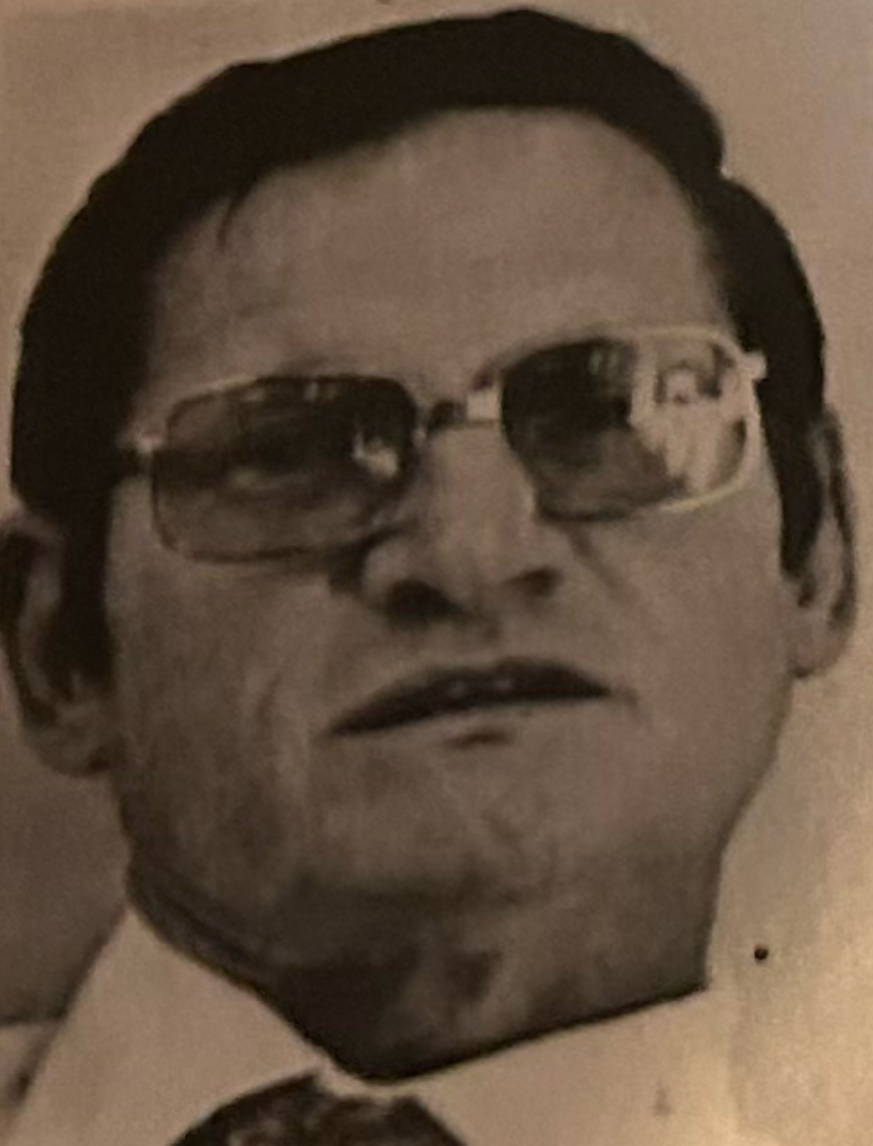

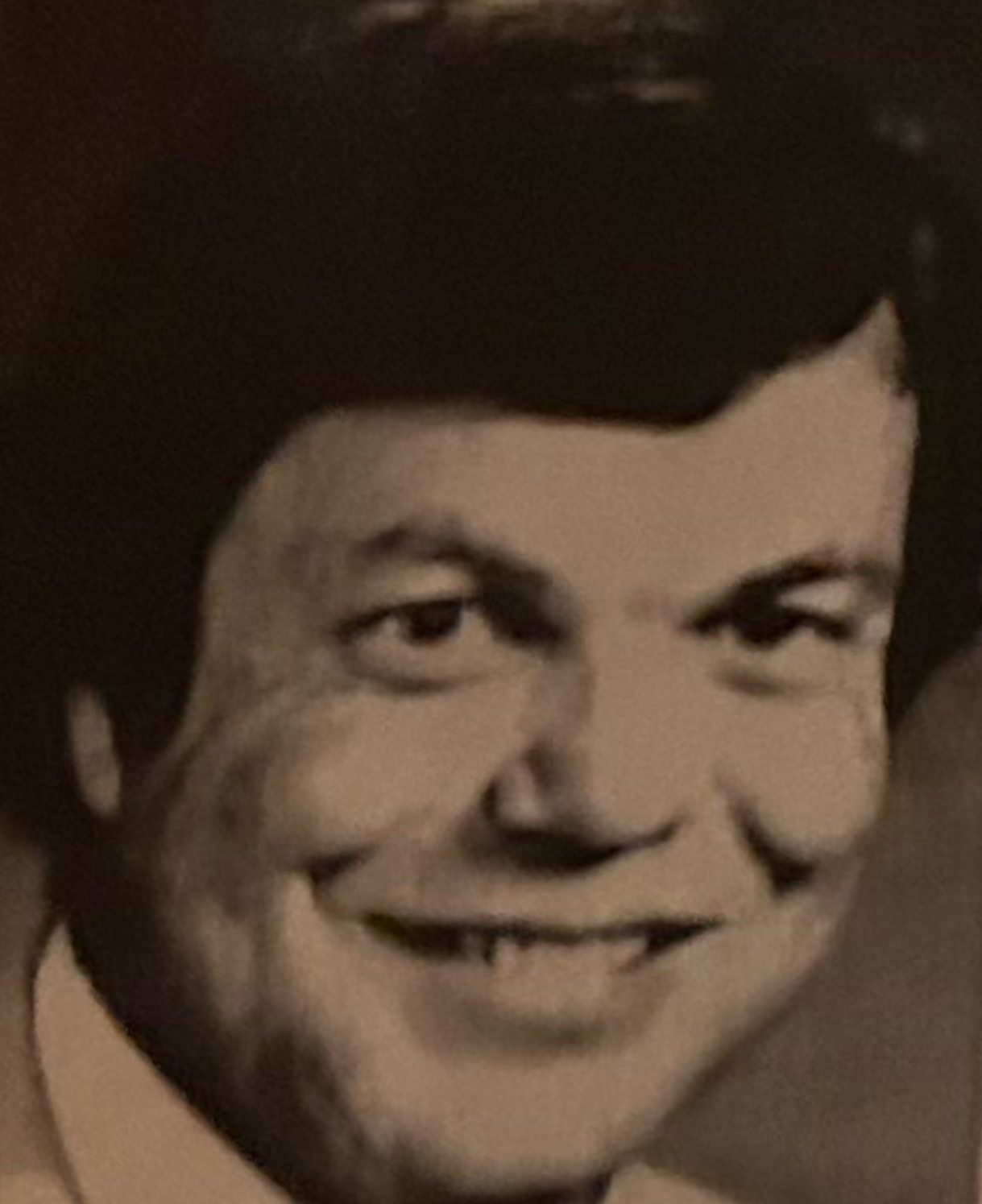
Candidate	Donald E. Hayhurst	O. Clyde Prather
Party	Nonpartisan	Nonpartisan
Popular vote	2235	1740
Percentage	56.2%	43.8%
Mayor before election
James K. Haygood Jr.
Elected mayor
Donald E. Hayhurst

Donald E. Hayhurst won the runoff election.

==== First round ====
1976 Auburn, Alabama mayoral election
Candidate	Votes	%
Donald E. Hayhurst	1,452	36.5%
O. Clyde Prather	1,016	25.6%
Ruth Speake	904	22.8%
T. J. Denny	361	9.1%
Howard S. Bialas	240	6.0%
Total votes	3,973	100.0%

==== Runoff ====
1976 Auburn, Alabama mayoral election runoff
Candidate	Votes	%
Donald E. Hayhurst	2,235	56.2%
O. Clyde Prather	1,740	43.8%
Total votes	3,975	100.0%

=== City council elections ===
==== City council president ====
1976 Auburn, Alabama city council president election
Candidate	Votes	%
William H. Allen	1,835	47.7%
Eugene E. Stanaland	1,748	45.4%
Mark R. Biggers	267	6.9%
Total votes	3,850	100.0%

===== Runoff =====
Incumbent Eugene Stanaland was defeated by William Allen after he was only able to win one of the four wards.

1976 Auburn, Alabama city council president election runoff
Candidate	Votes	%
William H. Allen	2,105	53.5%
Eugene E. Stanaland	1,829	46.5%
Total votes	3,934	100.0%

==== Ward 1, Place 1 ====
1976 Auburn, Alabama municipal election — Ward 1, Place 1
Candidate	Votes	%
Lindburgh Jackson	574	44.1%
Herman D. Alexander	346	26.6%
Lewis A. Pick Jr.	318	24.4%
Floyd Likins Jr.	64	4.9%
Total votes	1,302	100.0%

===== Runoff =====
1976 Auburn, Alabama municipal election — Ward 1, Place 1 runoff
Candidate	Votes	%
Lindburgh Jackson	758	56.7%
Herman D. Alexander	578	43.3%
Total votes	1,336	100.0%

==== Ward 1, Place 2 ====
1976 Auburn, Alabama municipal election — Ward 1, Place 2
Candidate	Votes	%
Mary E. Brooks	670	51.8%
Nancy L. Lair	361	27.9%
Don Adams	199	15.4%
Mike Smelley	63	4.9%
Total votes	1,293	100.0%

==== Ward 2, Place 1 ====
1976 Auburn, Alabama municipal election — Ward 2, Place 1
Candidate	Votes	%
A. Denson Lipscomb	245	69.4%
Randall W. Diamond	60	17.0%
Hyron C. Goolsby	48	13.6%
Total votes	353	100.0%

==== Ward 2, Place 2 ====
1976 Auburn, Alabama municipal election — Ward 2, Place 2
Candidate	Votes	%
Walter C. Giddens	127	37.5%
Philip L. Fretwell	101	29.8%
Renza Williams	86	25.4%
David L. Dresher	25	7.4%
Total votes	339	100.0%

===== Runoff =====
1976 Auburn, Alabama municipal election — Ward 2, Place 2 runoff
Candidate	Votes	%
Walter C. Giddens	150	58.8%
Philip L. Fretwell	105	41.2%
Total votes	255	100.0%

==== Ward 3, Place 1 ====
1976 Auburn, Alabama municipal election — Ward 3, Place 1
Candidate	Votes	%
Frances W. Hale	600	49.1%
Dewey V. Northcutt	573	46.9%
Rebecca D. Paulk	49	4.0%
Total votes	1,222	100.0%

===== Runoff =====
1976 Auburn, Alabama municipal election — Ward 3, Place 1 runoff
Candidate	Votes	%
Frances W. Hale	759	57.7%
Dewey V. Northcutt	557	42.3%
Total votes	1,316	100.0%

==== Ward 3, Place 2 ====
1976 Auburn, Alabama municipal election — Ward 3, Place 2
Candidate	Votes	%
Hoyt M. Warren	670	59.9%
Wiley G. Hartzog Jr.	239	21.4%
Victor E. Vance	172	15.4%
A.J. Wright	138	12.3%
Total votes	1,119	100.0%

==== Ward 4, Place 1 ====
1976 Auburn, Alabama municipal election — Ward 4, Place 1
Candidate	Votes	%
James Earl Kennamer	543	54.2%
Laura K. Wright	368	36.8%
Kevin J. Carroll	90	9.0%
Total votes	1,001	100.0%

==== Ward 4, Place 2 ====
1976 Auburn, Alabama municipal election — Ward 4, Place 2
Candidate	Votes	%
H. C. Morgan	656	74.0%
Agnes N. Meagher	265	29.9%
Ken L. Scheinert	57	6.4%
Total votes	887	100.0%

== 1980 ==
The 1980 election was held on 8 July 1980, with runoff elections being held on 29 July 1980.

=== Mayoral ===
1980 Auburn, Alabama mayoral election
- 8 July 1980
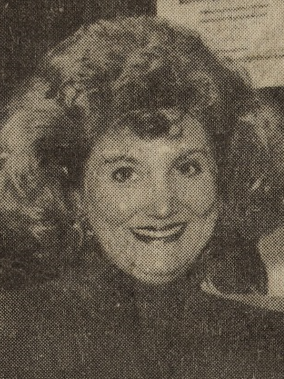

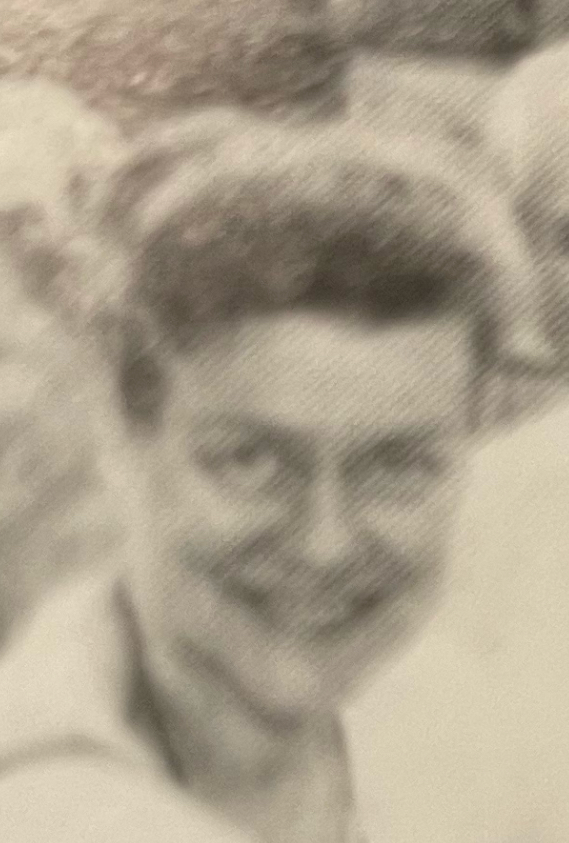

Candidate	Jan Dempsey	Caine Campbell	Ruth Speake
Party	Nonpartisan	Nonpartisan	Nonpartisan
Popular vote	1,952	1,037	785
Percentage	46.4%	24.6%	18.7%
Candidate	Mike Lisano
Party	Nonpartisan
Popular vote	339
Percentage	8.1%
Mayor before election
Donald E. Hayhurst
Elected mayor
Jan Dempsey

==== First round ====
1980 Auburn, Alabama mayoral election
Candidate	Votes	%
Jan Dempsey	1,952	46.4%
Caine Campbell	1,037	24.6%
Ruth Speake	785	18.7%
Mike Lisano	339	8.1%
James Michael Williams	94	2.2%
Total votes	4,207	100.0%

==== Runoff ====
On 10 July 1980, Caine Campbell filed a notice of withdrawal with the City of Auburn. As the only remaining candidate, Jan Dempsey was selected as mayor with no runoff election held.

=== City council elections ===
No election was held for Ward 3, Place 2.

==== City council president ====
1980 Auburn, Alabama city council president election
Candidate	Votes	%
Denson Lipscomb	2,275	56.4%
John C. Walden	1,761	43.6%
Total votes	4,036	100.0%

==== Ward 1, Place 1 ====
1980 Auburn, Alabama municipal election — Ward 1, Place 1
Candidate	Votes	%
Charlotte R. Ward	677	50.9%
Lindburgh Jackson	396	29.8%
Robert D. French	155	11.6%
Jimmy L. Robinson	103	7.7%
Total votes	1,331	100.0%

==== Ward 1, Place 2 ====
1980 Auburn, Alabama municipal election — Ward 1, Place 2
Candidate	Votes	%
Mary Earnestine Byrd Brooks	659	50.8%
Ray Black	637	49.2%
Total votes	1,296	100.0%

==== Ward 2, Place 1 ====
1980 Auburn, Alabama municipal election — Ward 2, Place 1
Candidate	Votes	%
Mary Fortenberry	166	53.4%
Joe Davis	145	46.6%
Total votes	311	100.0%

==== Ward 2, Place 2 ====
1980 Auburn, Alabama municipal election — Ward 2, Place 2
Candidate	Votes	%
Alex R. Moore	196	64.7%
Herman Humphries	107	35.3%
Total votes	303	100.0%

==== Ward 3, Place 1 ====
1980 Auburn, Alabama municipal election — Ward 3, Place 1
Candidate	Votes	%
Lamar Sellers	834	73.6%
B. L. Watwood	299	26.4%
Total votes	1,133	100.0%

==== Ward 4, Place 1 ====
1980 Auburn, Alabama municipal election — Ward 4, Place 1
Candidate	Votes	%
Joel L. Tremaine	689	54.6%
Roderic V. Wiley	300	23.8%
B. L. Pelham	235	18.6%
John C. Mullins	39	3.1%
Total votes	1,263	100.0%

==== Ward 4, Place 2 ====
1980 Auburn, Alabama municipal election — Ward 4, Place 2
Candidate	Votes	%
J. R. Quillen	580	49.0%
Frank Williamson	385	32.5%
Mark S. Wright	218	18.4%
Total votes	1,183	100.0%

===== Runoff =====
1980 Auburn, Alabama municipal election — Ward 4, Place 2 runoff
Candidate	Votes	%
J. R. Quillen	252	64.1%
Frank Williamson	141	35.9%
Total votes	393	100.0%

== 1982 ==
The 1982 election was held on 13 July 1982, with the runoff elections being held on 3 August 1982. This was also the final election in which a city council president was elected.

=== Mayoral ===
1982 Auburn, Alabama mayoral election
- 13 July 1982
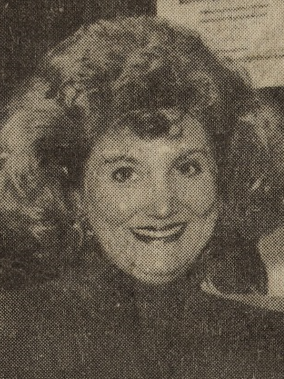
Candidate	Jan Dempsey
Party	Nonpartisan
Popular vote	Unopposed
Mayor before election
Jan Dempsey
Elected mayor
Jan Dempsey

Incumbent mayor Jan Dempsey was the only qualified candidate, and as such, she won the election unopposed.

=== City council ===
No elections were held for the following seats:

- Ward 1, Place 1
- Ward 2, Place 1
- Ward 3, Place 1
- Ward 4, Place 1

==== City council president ====
1982 Auburn, Alabama city council presidential election
Candidate	Votes	%
Charlotte R. Ward	988	40.9%
Victor E. Vance	863	35.8%
Hugh D. Reagan	562	23.3%
Total votes	2,413	100.0%

===== Runoff =====
1982 Auburn, Alabama city council presidential election runoff
Candidate	Votes	%
Victor E. Vance	1,441	53.3%
Charlotte R. Ward	1,261	46.7%
Total votes	2,702	100.0%

==== Ward 1, Place 2 ====
1982 Auburn, Alabama municipal election — Ward 1, Place 2
Candidate	Votes	%
Sam Harris	411	63.4%
Kenneth D. Pylant II	213	32.9%
Jonathan B. Saxon	24	3.7%
Total votes	648	100.0%

==== Ward 2, Place 2 ====
1982 Auburn, Alabama municipal election — Ward 2, Place 2
Candidate	Votes	%
Darrell D. Penrod	93	47.7%
M. Padraig McLoughlin	54	27.7%
Herman Humphries	48	24.6%
Total votes	195	100.0%

===== Runoff =====
1982 Auburn, Alabama municipal election — Ward 2, Place 2 runoff
Candidate	Votes	%
Darrell D. Penrod	137	55.0%
M. Padraig McLoughlin	112	45.0%
Total votes	249	100.0%

==== Ward 3, Place 2 ====
1982 Auburn, Alabama municipal election — Ward 3, Place 2
Candidate	Votes	%
Frances W. Hale	388	46.5%
Roderick W. Powers	328	39.3%
Jennifer Chambliss	118	14.1%
Total votes	834	100.0%

===== Runoff =====
1982 Auburn, Alabama municipal election — Ward 4, Place 2 runoff
Candidate	Votes	%
Frances W. Hale	494	53.2%
Roderick M. Powers	435	46.8%
Total votes	929	100.0%

==== Ward 4, Place 2 ====
1982 Auburn, Alabama municipal election — Ward 4, Place 2
Candidate	Votes	%
Hal Goebel	434	61.8%
Jim Quillin	228	32.5%
H. Brent Whitaker III	40	5.7%
Total votes	702	100.0%

== 1984 ==
The 1984 election was held on 10 July 1984.

=== Mayoral ===
1984 Auburn, Alabama mayoral election
- 10 July 1984
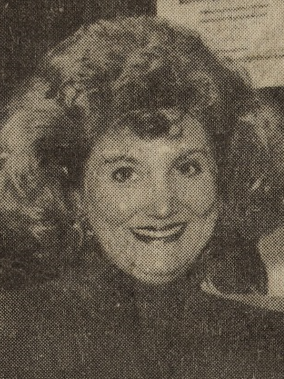

Candidate	Jan Dempsey	Samuel Harris	Charles Lindner
Party	Nonpartisan	Nonpartisan	Nonpartisan
Popular vote	1,591	591	139
Percentage	64.5%	23.9%	5.6%
Candidate	C. Ted Murphy
Party	Nonpartisan
Popular vote	130
Percentage	5.3%
Mayor before election
Jan Dempsey
Elected mayor
Jan Dempsey

1984 Auburn, Alabama mayoral election
Candidate	Votes	%
Jan Dempsey	1,591	64.5%
Samuel Harris	591	23.9%
Charles Lindner	139	5.6%
C. Ted Murphy	130	5.3%
Herman Humphries	17	0.7%
Total votes	2,468	100.0%

=== City council elections ===
No elections were held for the following seats:

- Ward 1, Place 2
- Ward 2, Place 2
- Ward 3, Place 2
- Ward 4, Place 1
- Ward 4, Place 2

==== Ward 1, Place 1 ====
1984 Auburn, Alabama municipal election — Ward 1, Place 1
Candidate	Votes	%
Charlotte Ward	463	54.7%
Lindburgh Jackson	383	45.3%
Total votes	846	100.0%

==== Ward 2, Place 1 ====
1984 Auburn, Alabama municipal election — Ward 2, Place 1
Candidate	Votes	%
Mary Fortenberry	130	72.6%
Royce Morris	28	15.6%
Michael McLoughlin	21	11.7%
Total votes	179	100.0%

==== Ward 3, Place 1 ====
1984 Auburn, Alabama municipal election — Ward 3, Place 1
Candidate	Votes	%
Lamar Sellers	524	66.7%
Roderick W. Powers	268	33.3%
Total votes	792	100.0%

== 1986 ==
The 1986 election was held on 8 July 1986, with the runoff elections being held on 29 July 1986.

=== Mayoral ===
1986 Auburn, Alabama mayoral election
- 8 July 1986
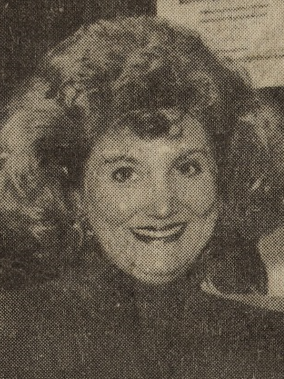

Candidate	Jan Dempsey	Victor E. Vance
Party	Nonpartisan	Nonpartisan
Popular vote	2,803	1,117
Percentage	71.5%	28.5%
Mayor before election
Jan Dempsey
Elected mayor
Jan Dempsey

1986 Auburn, Alabama mayoral election
Candidate	Votes	%
Jan Dempsey	2,803	71.5%
Victor E. Vance	1,117	28.5%
Total votes	3,920	100.0%

=== City council elections ===
No elections were held for the following seats:

- District 1, Post 2
- District 2, Post 2
- District 3, Post 1

==== District 1, Post 1 ====
1986 Auburn, Alabama municipal election — District 1, Post 1
Candidate	Votes	%
Robert A. Gastaldo	441	38.9%
Charlotte R. Ward	366	32.2%
Geoffrey Bennett	328	28.9%
Total votes	1,135	100.0%

===== Runoff =====
1986 Auburn, Alabama municipal election — District 1, Post 1 runoff
Candidate	Votes	%
Robert A. Gastaldo	419	57.3%
Charlotte R. Ward	312	42.7%
Total votes	731	100.0%

==== District 2, Post 1 ====
1986 Auburn, Alabama municipal election — District 2, Post 1
Candidate	Votes	%
Mary Fortenberry	202	64.5%
Royce J. Morris	111	35.5%
Total votes	313	100.0%

==== District 3, Post 2 ====
1986 Auburn, Alabama municipal election — District 3, Post 2
Candidate	Votes	%
Frances W. Hale	772	57.6%
Margaret Hendricks	569	42.4%
Total votes	1,341	100.0%

==== District 4, Post 1 ====
1986 Auburn, Alabama municipal election — District 4, Post 1
Candidate	Votes	%
W. G. Johnston III	641	59.5%
Leon Bone	436	40.5%
Total votes	1,077	100.0%

==== District 4, Post 2 ====
===== Endorsements =====
Bill Ham Jr.

Mayor

- Jan Dempsey; Incumbent mayor of Auburn, Alabama

===== Results =====
1986 Auburn, Alabama municipal election — District 4, Post 2
Candidate	Votes	%
Bill Ham Jr.	636	58.2%
J. Quillin	372	34.0%
Scott Placek	85	7.8%
Total votes	1,093	100.0%

== 1990 ==
The 1990 election was held on 28 August 1990, with the runoff elections being held on 18 September 1990.

=== Mayoral ===
1990 Auburn, Alabama mayoral election
- 28 August 1990
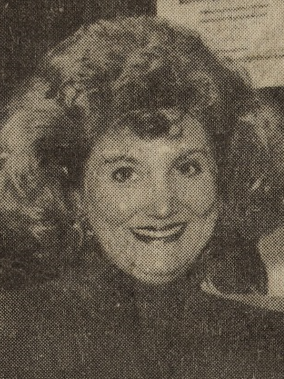

Candidate	Jan M. Dempsey	Lamar Sellers
Party	Nonpartisan	Nonpartisan
Popular vote	2,326	992
Percentage	70.1%	29.9%
Mayor before election
Jan Dempsey
Elected mayor
Jan Dempsey

1990 Auburn, Alabama mayoral election
Candidate	Votes	%
Jan Dempsey	2,326	70.1%
Lamar Sellers	992	29.9%
Total votes	3,318	100.0%

=== City council elections ===
No elections were held for the following seats:

- Ward 2, Place 1
- Ward 2, Place 2
- Ward 4, Place 2

==== Ward 1, Place 1 ====
1990 Auburn, Alabama municipal election — Ward 1, Place 1
Candidate	Votes	%
Robert A. Gastaldo	452	50.0%
Logan B. Gray	452	50.0%
Total votes	904	100.0%

===== Runoff =====
1990 Auburn, Alabama municipal election — Ward 1, Place 1 runoff
Candidate	Votes	%
Robert A. Gastaldo	453	54.4%
Logan B. Gray	380	45.6%
Total votes	833	100.0%

==== Ward 1, Place 2 ====
1990 Auburn, Alabama municipal election — Ward 1, Place 2
Candidate	Votes	%
Samuel Harris	599	71.6%
Arthur L. Dowdell Sr.	238	28.4%
Total votes	837	100.0%

==== Ward 3, Place 1 ====
1990 Auburn, Alabama municipal election — Ward 3, Place 1
Candidate	Votes	%
W. G. Johnston III	767	71.6%
Veronica McGill Urban	371	28.4%
Total votes	1,138	100.0%

==== Ward 3, Place 2 ====
1990 Auburn, Alabama municipal election — Ward 3, Place 2
Candidate	Votes	%
Bill Mixon	744	63.7%
Albert F. Killian	418	36.3%
Total votes	1,162	100.0%

==== Ward 4, Place 1 ====
1990 Auburn, Alabama municipal election — Ward 4, Place 1
Candidate	Votes	%
Kenneth H. Brown	428	47.8%
H. N. Conrad	283	31.6%
Dixie Connor	185	20.6%
Total votes	896	100.0%

===== Runoff =====
1990 Auburn, Alabama municipal election — Ward 4, Place 1 runoff
Candidate	Votes	%
Kenneth H. Brown	233	63.0%
H. N. Conrad	137	37.0%
Total votes	370	100.0%

== 1994 ==
The 1994 election was held on 23 August 1994, with runoffs being held on 13 September 1994.

=== Mayoral ===
1994 Auburn, Alabama mayoral election
- 23 August 1994
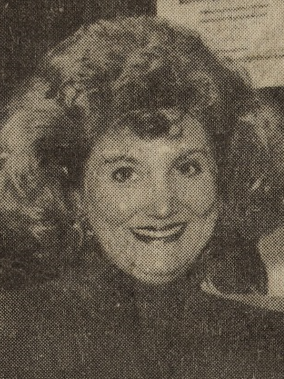

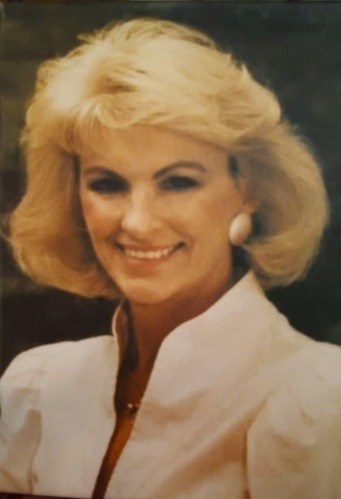

Candidate	Jan Dempsey	Wanda West	Robert Schaeffer
Party	Nonpartisan	Nonpartisan	Nonpartisan
Popular vote	2,671	1,446	322
Percentage	60.2%	32.6%	7.3%
Mayor before election
Jan Dempsey
Elected mayor
Jan Dempsey

Incumbent mayor Jan Dempsey won a majority of votes in the first round against two opposition candidates.

1994 Auburn, Alabama mayoral election
Candidate	Votes	%
Jan Dempsey	2,671	60.2%
Wanda West	1,446	32.6%
Robert Schaeffer	322	7.3%
Total votes	4,439	100.0%

=== City council elections ===
No elections were held for the following seats:

- Ward 3, Place 1
- Ward 4, Place 1
- Ward 4, Place 2

==== Ward 1, Place 1 ====
1994 Auburn, Alabama municipal election — Ward 1, Place 1
Candidate	Votes	%
Arthur L. Dowdell Sr.	277	54.5%
Frankie King	190	37.4%
Herman Humphries	41	8.1%
Total votes	508	100.0%

==== Ward 1, Place 2 ====
1994 Auburn, Alabama municipal election — Ward 1, Place 2
Candidate	Votes	%
Logan B. Gray	412	52.8%
Samuel Harris	368	47.2%
Total votes	780	100.0%

==== Ward 2, Place 1 ====
1994 Auburn, Alabama municipal election — Ward 2, Place 1
Candidate	Votes	%
Mary Fortenberry	315	57.9%
Walter Giddens	229	42.1%
Total votes	544	100.0%

==== Ward 2, Place 2 ====
1994 Auburn, Alabama municipal election — Ward 2, Place 2
Candidate	Votes	%
Cheryl Gladden	229	40.2%
Trey Rankin	186	32.6%
Ashley Wright	155	27.2%
Total votes	570	100.0%

===== Runoff =====
1994 Auburn, Alabama municipal election — Ward 2, Place 2 runoff
Candidate	Votes	%
Cheryl Gladden	169	74.4%
Trey Rankin	58	25.6%
Total votes	227	100.0%

==== Ward 3, Place 2 ====
1994 Auburn, Alabama municipal election — Ward 3, Place 2
Candidate	Votes	%
Bill Mixon	895	76.6%
Richard P. Palmedo II	273	23.4%
Total votes	1,168	100.0%

== 1998 ==
The 1998 election was held on 25 August 1998, with the runoff elections being held on 15 September 1995.

=== Mayoral ===
1998 Auburn, Alabama mayoral election
- 25 August 1998
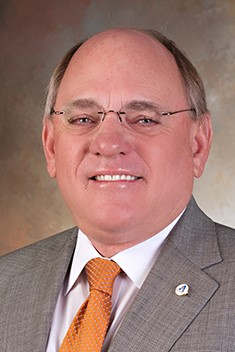

Candidate	Bill Ham Jr.	Patrick Dorminey
Party	Nonpartisan	Nonpartisan
Popular vote	3,047	564
Percentage	84.4%	15.6%
Mayor before election
Jan Dempsey
Elected mayor
Bill Ham Jr.

Bill Ham Jr. won the election in a landslide vote.

1998 Auburn, Alabama mayoral election
Candidate	Votes	%
Bill Ham Jr.	3,047	84.4%
Patrick Dorminey	564	15.6%
Total votes	3,611	100.0%

=== City council election ===
No elections were held for the following seats:

- Ward 2, Place 1
- Ward 3, Place 1
- Ward 4, Place 1

==== Ward 1, Place 1 ====
1998 Auburn, Alabama municipal election — Ward 1, Place 1
Candidate	Votes	%
Arthur L. Dowdell	263	55.4%
Everett Debrow Jr.	212	44.6%
Total votes	475	100.0%

==== Ward 1, Place 2 ====
1998 Auburn, Alabama municipal election — Ward 1, Place 2
Candidate	Votes	%
Logan B. Gray	432	70.6%
Douglas J. Barrett	180	29.4%
Total votes	612	100.0%

==== Ward 2, Place 2 ====
1998 Auburn, Alabama municipal election — Ward 2, Place 2
Candidate	Votes	%
Cheryl Gladden	237	80.3%
Walter C. Giddens	58	19.7%
Total votes	295	100.0%

==== Ward 3, Place 2 ====
1998 Auburn, Alabama municipal election — Ward 3, Place 2
Candidate	Votes	%
Rod Popwell	464	40.2%
Bill Mixon	383	33.2%
J. A. Conner	307	26.6%
Total votes	1,154	100.0%

===== Runoff =====
1998 Auburn, Alabama municipal election — Ward 3, Place 2 runoff
Candidate	Votes	%
Rod Popwell	588	65.9%
Bill Mixon	304	34.1%
Total votes	892	100.0%

==== Ward 4, Place 2 ====
1998 Auburn, Alabama municipal election — Ward 4, Place 2
Candidate	Votes	%
David Cicci	397	36.9%
Nevil M. Garrett	348	32.3%
William Allbrook	332	30.8%
Total votes	1,077	100.0%

===== Runoff =====
1998 Auburn, Alabama municipal election — Ward 4, Place 2 runoff
Candidate	Votes	%
David Cicci	540	58.6%
Nevil M. Garrett	381	41.4%
Total votes	921	100.0%

== 2002 ==
The 2002 election was held on 27 August 2002.

=== Mayoral ===
2002 Auburn, Alabama mayoral election
- 27 August 2002
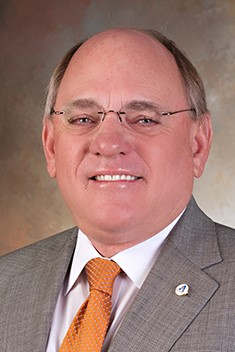
Candidate	Bill Ham Jr.
Party	Nonpartisan
Popular vote	Unopposed
Mayor before election
Bill Ham Jr.
Elected mayor
Bill Ham Jr.

Incumbent mayor Bill Ham Jr. did not have opposition, and won the election unopposed.

=== City council elections ===
No elections were held for the following seats:

- Ward 2, Place 2

==== Ward 1, Place 1 ====
2002 Auburn, Alabama municipal election — Ward 1, Place 1
Candidate	Votes	%
Verlinda J. White	235	51.8%
Arthur L. Dowdell Sr.	219	48.2%
Total votes	454	100.0%

==== Ward 1, Place 2 ====
2002 Auburn, Alabama municipal election — Ward 1, Place 2
Candidate	Votes	%
Sheila Eckman	427	53.0%
Tracie West	382	47.0%
Total votes	809	100.0%

==== Ward 2, Place 1 ====
2002 Auburn, Alabama municipal election — Ward 2, Place 1
Candidate	Votes	%
Roberta Jackel	454	52.5%
Sherry Faust	410	47.5%
Total votes	864	100.0%

==== Ward 3, Place 1 ====
2002 Auburn, Alabama municipal election — Ward 3, Place 1
Candidate	Votes	%
K. Ted Wilson	813	51.8%
David Martin	758	48.2%
Total votes	1,571	100.0%

==== Ward 3, Place 2 ====
2002 Auburn, Alabama municipal election — Ward 3, Place 2
Candidate	Votes	%
Dick Phelan	794	50.6%
Robin Kelley	373	23.8%
Rod Popwell	325	20.7%
Wes McGugin	78	4.9%
Total votes	1,570	100.0%

==== Ward 4, Place 1 ====
2002 Auburn, Alabama municipal election — Ward 4, Place 1
Candidate	Votes	%
Carolyn G. Mathews	809	61.6%
Keith Campagna	504	38.4%
Total votes	1,313	100.0%

==== Ward 4, Place 2 ====
2002 Auburn, Alabama municipal election — Ward 4, Place 2
Candidate	Votes	%
Gene Dulaney	768	58.5%
David Cicci	544	41.5%
Total votes	1,312	100.0%

== 2006 ==
The 2006 election was held on 22 August 2006, with runoffs being held on 10 September 2006.

=== Mayoral ===
2006 Auburn, Alabama mayoral election
- 22 August 2006
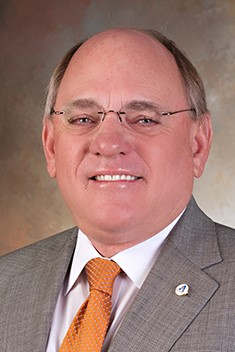

Candidate	Bill Ham Jr.	William McLaurine
Party	Nonpartisan	Nonpartisan
Popular vote	4,538	961
Percentage	77.6%	22.4%
Mayor before election
Bill Ham Jr.
Elected mayor
Bill Ham Jr.

Bill Ham Jr. won the election with 77.6% of the vote.

2006 Auburn, Alabama mayoral election
Candidate	Votes	%
Bill Ham Jr.	3,322	77.6%
William McLaurine	961	22.4%
Total votes	4,283	100.0%

=== City council elections ===
Any runoff elections were held on 12 September.

==== Ward 1 ====
2006 Auburn, Alabama municipal election – Ward 1
Candidate	Votes	%
Arthur L. Dowdell Sr.	140	35.6%
Verlinda J. White	133	33.8%
Christine Berry Bradshaw	120	30.5%
Total votes	393	100.0%

===== Runoff =====
2006 Auburn, Alabama municipal election ― Ward 1 runoff
Candidate	Votes	%
Arthur L. Dowdell Sr.	222	52.4%
Verlinda J. White	201	47.6%
Total votes	423	100.0%

==== Ward 2 ====
2006 Auburn, Alabama municipal election – Ward 2
Candidate	Votes	%
Sheila H. Eckman	669	61.5%
Verlinda J. White	418	38.5%
Total votes	1,087	100.0%

==== Ward 3 ====
2006 Auburn, Alabama municipal election – Ward 3
Candidate	Votes	%
Thomas Worden	287	62.3%
John T. Braswell	174	37.7%
Total votes	461	100.0%

==== Ward 4 ====
2006 Auburn, Alabama municipal election – Ward 4
Candidate	Votes	%
Brent Beard	Unopposed	100%

==== Ward 5 ====
2006 Auburn, Alabama municipal election – Ward 5
Candidate	Votes	%
Robin Kelley	461	50.8%
Teresa Rodriguez	455	49.2%
Total votes	916	100.0%

==== Ward 6 ====
2006 Auburn, Alabama municipal election – Ward 6
Candidate	Votes	%
Dick Phelan	Unopposed	100%

==== Ward 7 ====
2006 Auburn, Alabama municipal election – Ward 7
Candidate	Votes	%
Gene Dulaney	Unopposed	100%

==== Ward 8 ====
2006 Auburn, Alabama municipal election – Ward 8
Candidate	Votes	%
Bob Norman	242	69.9%
James A. Conner Jr.	104	30.1%
Total votes	346	100.0%

== 2022 ==
Incumbent mayor Ron Anders Jr. ran unopposed in the election.

== 2026 ==
The 2026 elections will be held on 25 August 2026.

=== Mayor ===
2026 Auburn, Alabama mayoral election
- August 25, 2026
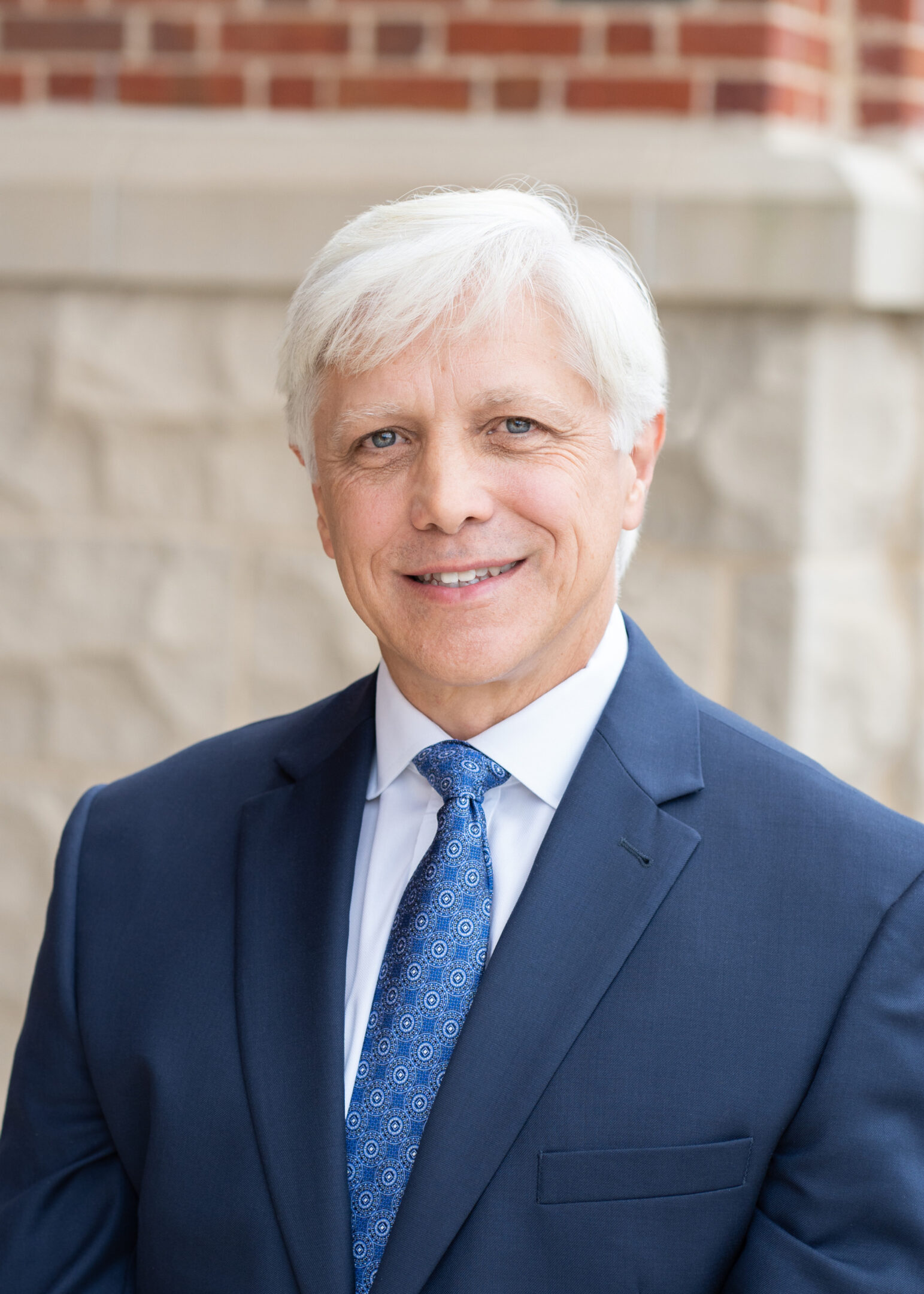

Candidate	Ron Anders Jr.	Robert Wilkins
Party	Nonpartisan	Nonpartisan
Incumbent mayor
Ron Anders Jr.

Incumbent mayor Ron Anders Jr. was re-elected.

==== Candidates ====
===== Declared =====
- Ron Anders Jr., incumbent mayor (2018–present)
- Robert Wilkins

===== Disqualified =====
- Jimmy Glenn

=== City council ===
==== Ward 1 ====
Incumbent city councilmember Connie-Fitch Taylor was first elected in 2018. She was re-elected unopposed.

==== Ward 2 ====
Incumbent city councilmember Kelley Griswold was first elected in 2018. He chose to not run for re-election. Kirsten Milenkovitch was elected unopposed to replace him.

==== Ward 3 ====
Incumbent city councilmember Beth Witten was first elected in 2014. She was re-elected unopposed.

==== Ward 4 ====
Incumbent city councilmember Tyler Adams was first elected in 2022. He was re-elected unopposed.

==== Ward 5 ====
===== Candidates =====
====== Declared ======
- Toshiro Jackson
- Mike Menese
- Sonny Moreman, incumbent city council member (2022–present)

==== Ward 6 ====
Incumbent city councilmember Bob Parsons was first elected in 2018. He was re-elected unopposed.

==== Ward 7 ====
Incumbent city councilmember Max Coblentz was first elected in 2018. He was re-elected unopposed.

==== Ward 8 ====
===== Candidates =====
====== Declared ======
- Augustus Ayers
- Tommy Dawson, incumbent city council member (2014–present)

=== Election summary ===
Position	Before election	After election
Mayor	Ron Anders Jr.	TBD
Ward 1	Connie Fitch Taylor	TBD
Ward 2	Kelley Griswold	TBD
Ward 3	Beth Witten	TBD
Ward 4	Tyler Adams	TBD
Ward 5	Sonny Moreman	TBD
Ward 6	Bob Parsons	TBD
Ward 7	Max Coblentz	TBD
Ward 8	Tommy Dawson	TBD

== Referendums ==
Referendums are held in Auburn primarily to allow residents to vote on tax propositions.

=== 2001 Five Mill Tax referendum ===
A referendum was held on August 28, 2001, to determine voter approval on how to use revenue from the Five Mill Tax, established in 1948. The referendum granted funding to the building of a new cemetery, a passive park, and a new soccer complex.

==== Results ====
2001 Five Mill Tax referendum
Choice	Votes	%
For	1,201	94.42
Against	71	5.58
Total	1,272	100.00

=== 2001 Auburn City Schools school tax extension ===
==== Results ====
2001 Auburn City Schools school tax extension
Choice	Votes	%
For	1,184	92.86
Against	91	7.14
Total	1,275	100.00

=== 2012 Special Five-Mill Tax Referendum ===
A referendum was held on January 24, 2012, to determine voter approval on how to use revenue from the Special Five-Mill Tax. The referendum granted funding to a number of city-funded projects throughout Auburn.

==== Results ====
2012 Special Five-Mill Tax Referendum
Choice	Votes	%
For	1,105	86.73
Against	169	13.27
Total	1,274	100.00

=== 2013 School tax referendum ===
A referendum was held in 2013 to increase property taxes in the city, in order to fund the building of a new high school. The referendum failed at 46% in favor.

==== Results ====
2013 Auburn, Alabama school tax referendum
Choice	Votes	%
For	4,452	46.20
Against	5,185	53.80
Total	9,637	100.00

===== By ward =====
Ward	No	%	Yes	%	Total
Ward 1	249	65.5%	131	34.5%	380
Ward 2	986	51.8%	918	48.2%	1,904
Wards 3/4	994	59.4%	730	43.6%	1,674
Wards 5/6	1,137	50.3%	1,125	49.7%	2,262
Wards 7/8	1,669	54.1%	1,416	45.9%	3,085
Absentee	150	53.2%	132	46.8%	282

=== 2019 Special Municipal Bond election ===
2019 Special Municipal Bond election
Choice	Votes	%
For	727	91.45
Against	68	8.55
Total	795	100.00

==== By ward ====
Ward	Yes	%	No	%	Total
Wards 1/2	167	94.9%	9	5.1%	176
Wards 3/4	140	90.3%	15	9.7%	155
Wards 5/6	240	90.2%	26	9.8%	266
Wards 7/8	156	93.4%	11	6.6%	167
Absentee	24	77.4%	7	22.6%	31
