= G. N. Mitcham =

American engineer and politician

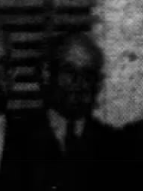
- Mitcham in 1947

Mayor of Auburn, Alabama
- In office 1916 – March 26, 1918
- Preceded by: J. W. Wright
- Succeeded by: C. S. Yarbrough

Personal details
- Died: March 29, 1958 (aged 78) Auburn, Alabama, U.S.
- Resting place: Auburn Baptist Church

George Nathan Mitcham (died March 29, 1958) was an American engineer, politician, and professor. He served as a state highway engineer for the U.S. state of Alabama, and was the Mayor of Auburn, Alabama from 1916 to 1918.

== Education ==
Mitcham graduated from the Alabama Polytechnic Institute in June 1898.

== Career ==
In 1903, Mitcham was elected as the chair of geology and mining engineering at the Alabama Polytechnic Institute.

He served as the mayor of Auburn, Alabama from 1916 until his resignation in March 1918.

Mitcham served on the Alabama State Highway Commission in the 1910s and 1920s, and as the president until 1916. He was the division engineer of the third division from 1920, until his resignation in 1925.

In 1922, Mitcham was elected as the president of the local chapter of the American Association of Engineers.

In 1926, he served as the interim city manager for Columbus, Georgia.

== Personal life and death ==
In 1913, Mitcham was involved in a car accident. He was sent through the front windshield and received various cuts on his arms and head.

Mitcham died on March 29, 1958.
