= Jan Dempsey =

Former Mayor of Auburn, Alabama

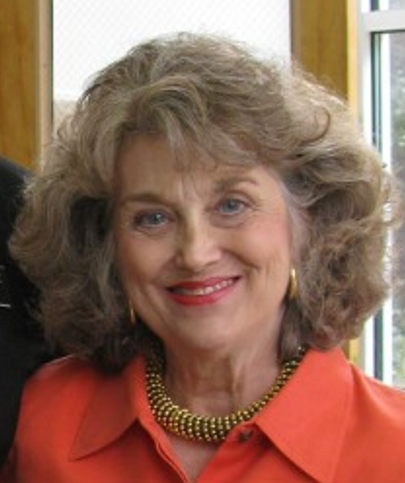
- Dempsey in 2020

Mayor of Auburn, Alabama
- In office 1980–1998
- Preceded by: Donald E. Hayhurst
- Succeeded by: Bill Ham Jr.

Personal details
- Born: October 4, 1942 (age 83)

Jan Miles Dempsey (born October 4, 1942) is an American politician who served as the mayor of Auburn, Alabama from 1980 to 1998. She was the first female mayor of the city.

== Mayor of Auburn ==
Dempsey was elected as the first female mayor of Auburn in 1980. In 1984, Dempsey was re-elected and established the economic development office. One of the biggest things that she is known for is her improvement of the Auburn City Schools school system where in 1986, she put in $600,000 of general city funds into the system. Ever since then, the council has kept contributing to the growth of the school system.

=== Auburn 2000 Plan ===
In her first year in office, she initiated a 20 year plan with her Auburn 2000 Plan. This plan set into place the council-manager form of government, saw the expansion of the water and sewage systems, helped develop the Auburn Technology Park along with partnerships with many other businesses, oversaw the expansion of recreational sports facilities, helped improve the roadways, implemented an affordable housing program, and supported many other developments. She signed in Auburn 2020 in 1998, which was the goals and directions for Auburn by the year 2020. Her leadership of these plans was praised by mayor Ron Anders Jr. as he began preparation for the Auburn 2040 Plan.

== Post-mayoral career ==
Dempsey ran for Alabama House of Representatives in 1998 against Mike Hubbard. She also had the Jan Dempsey Community Arts Center named after her. She helped launch the Community Market, part of the Food Bank of East Alabama, and served in leadership roles. Dempsey was appointed by Bill Ham Jr. to the Urban Core Task Force in 2006, created to review zoning regulations for downtown Auburn.

== Personal life ==
Dempsey has three children Lydia, David, and Richard. She was married to Dr. Richard Lee Dempsey until his death in 2018.

== Electoral history ==
1998 Alabama House of Representatives District 79 election
Party	Candidate	Votes	%
Republican	Mike Hubbard	8,356	58.27
Democratic	Jan Dempsey	5,971	41.64
Write-in		12	0.08
Total votes		14,339	100.00
