= Donald E. Hayhurst =

American politician (1924–2023)

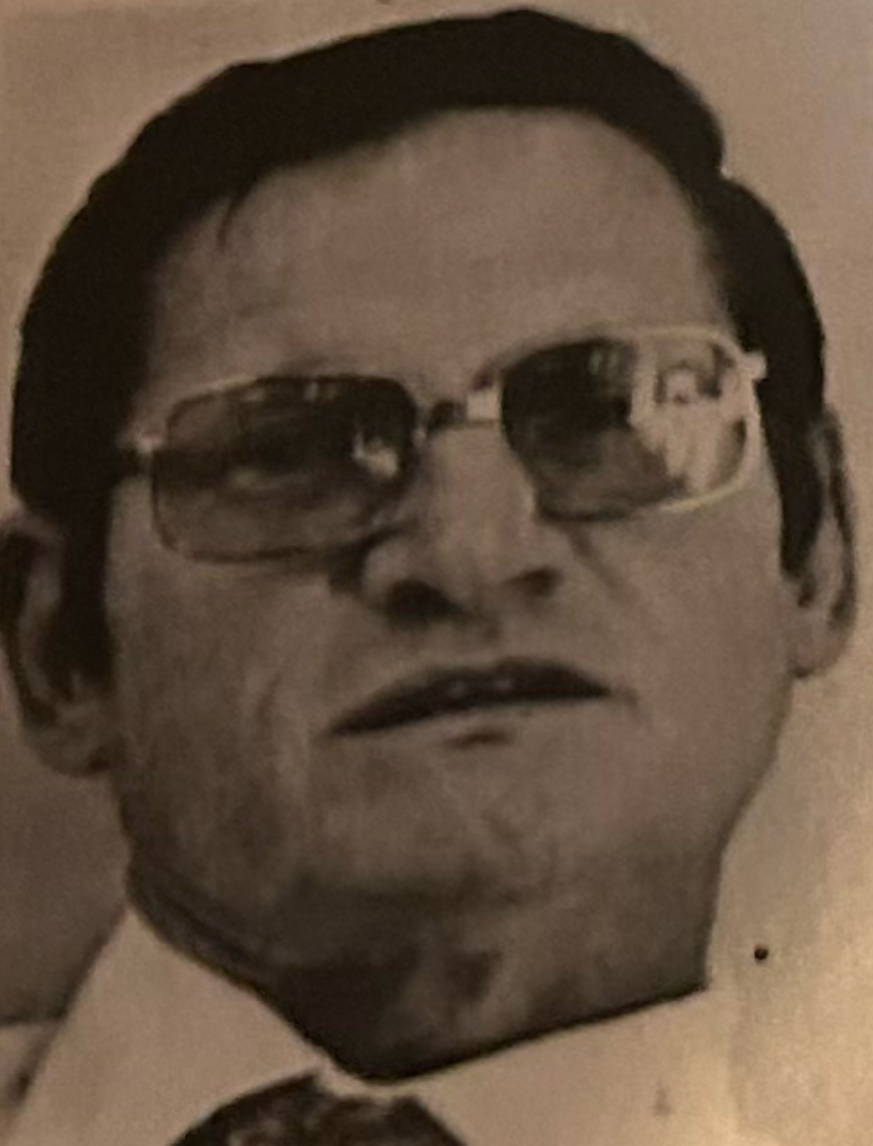
- Hayhurst in 1976

Mayor of Auburn, Alabama
- In office 1976–1980
- Preceded by: James K. Haygood Jr.
- Succeeded by: Jan Dempsey

Personal details
- Born: April 1, 1924
- Died: March 30, 2023 (aged 98) Deatsville, Alabama, US
- Education: University of Pittsburgh

Donald Edward Hayhurst (April 1, 1924 – March 30, 2023) was an American politician who served as the mayor of Auburn, Alabama, from 1976 to 1980. He also worked as a political science professor at Auburn University.

== Early life ==
Hayhurst was born on April 1, 1924. He was drafted into the United States Army when he was eighteen years old to serve in World War II. He was later recalled into service for the Korean War. Upon his return, he received his PhD from the University of Pittsburgh.

== Career ==
Upon completing his education, Hayhurst went to Auburn University, where he assisted in the creation of the political science department. He worked as a professor from 1968 to 1988.

=== Mayor of Auburn ===
In 1976, Hayhurst announced that he would run to become the next mayor of Auburn. One of his campaign promises was a pledge to attempt to abolish the office of mayor. He advanced from the first round on August 10, 1976, securing 36% of the vote against four opponents. His runoff opponent was O. Clyde Prather, a city councilmember. Hayhurst defeated Prather on September 14, 1976, with 56% of the vote.

As mayor, Hayhurst did not accept the salary of $7,800 per year. Hayhurst had a feud with Auburn city manager Earl Tisdale. At a meeting in June 1978, Hayhurst repeatedly publicly criticized Tisdale over his professional ability and intentions. Former city council president Eugene Stanaland attended a meeting in defense of Tisdale, where he expressed his disagreement with Hayhurst's method of criticism. Stanaland cited numerous news reports in which Hayhurst claimed Tisdale was single-handedly running the city, despite the examples Hayhurst had provided being examples where Tisdale performed his duties off the recommendation of others. Ultimately, the council backed up Tisdale in a narrow vote after Hayhurst left the meeting early.

In 1979, he sued the city council and five other residents over a $150,000 payment from the city to a corporation that installed sewage in the city. He alleged that former mayor James K. Haygood Jr. violated ethics as he was an attorney for the corporation at the time. The state ethics commission ruled that Haygood did not violate the law. In response to the lawsuit, all nine council members voted to approve a use of city funds to defend themselves in the case.

== Personal life and death ==
Hayhurst was married to his wife, Joyce, for 17 years. He died on March 30, 2023.
