= W. T. Andrews =

American politician (1867–1948)

Member of the Alabama House of Representatives from Lee County

Personal details
- Born: February 26, 1867 Oak Bowery, Alabama
- Died: October 17, 1948 (aged 81) Opelika, Alabama

William Thomas Andrews (February 26, 1867 – October 17, 1948) was an American politician. A member of the Democratic Party, he served in the Alabama House of Representatives.

== Career ==
Andrews was elected in 1914, as a representative for Lee County, Alabama, alongside C. S. Yarbrough.

== Death ==
Andrews died of a heart attack on October 17, 1948.
