= 2010 Auburn, Alabama municipal election =

The 2010 Auburn, Alabama municipal election was held August 24, 2010, to elect the mayor and all eight members of the city council.

== Mayoral election ==
2010 Auburn, Alabama mayoral election
- August 24, 2010
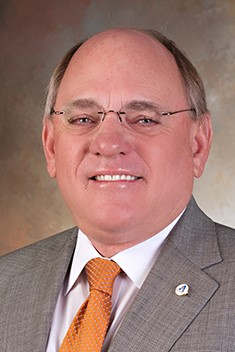

Candidate	Bill Ham Jr.	Paul Thompson
Party	Nonpartisan	Nonpartisan
Popular vote	2,768	518
Percentage	80.9%	19.1%
Mayor before election
Bill Ham Jr.
Elected mayor
Bill Ham Jr.

=== Candidates ===
==== Bill Ham Jr. ====
On April 20, 2010, incumbent mayor Bill Ham Jr. announced his bid for re-election, aiming for a fourth consecutive term. His campaign chairman was also confirmed to be Charles Pick at this time. He officially qualified for the ballot on July 7, 2010.

==== Paul Thompson ====
Thompson was the manager of Skybar in downtown Auburn. He labelled himself as a Christian conservative, primarily running to ensure that Ham did not run unopposed.

=== Results ===
Ham would go on to beat his only opponent, Paul Thompson in a landslide victory.

2010 Auburn, Alabama mayoral election
Candidate	Votes	%
Bill Ham Jr.	2,768	80.9%
Paul Thompson	518	19.1%
Total votes	2,686	100.0%

== City council elections ==
The list of candidates was confirmed 20 July 2010.

=== Ward 1 ===
2010 Auburn, Alabama municipal election – Ward 1
Candidate	Votes	%
Arthur L. Dowdell Sr.	Unopposed	100%

=== Ward 2 ===
2010 Auburn, Alabama municipal election – Ward 2
Candidate	Votes	%
Sheila Eckman	Unopposed	100%

=== Ward 3 ===
2010 Auburn, Alabama municipal election – Ward 3
Candidate	Votes	%
Thomas Worden	Unopposed	100%

=== Ward 4 ===
2010 Auburn, Alabama municipal election – Ward 4
Candidate	Votes	%
Brent Beard	193	82%
James "Jim" Douglas	42	18%
Total votes	235	100%

=== Ward 5 ===
2010 Auburn, Alabama municipal election – Ward 5
Candidate	Votes	%
Robin Kelly	Unopposed	100%

=== Ward 6 ===
2010 Auburn, Alabama municipal election – Ward 6
Candidate	Votes	%
Dick Phelan	Unopposed	100%

=== Ward 7 ===
Kevin Perry ran against incumbent Gene Dulaney, because he wished to have younger members elected to the council.

2010 Auburn, Alabama municipal election – Ward 4
Candidate	Votes	%
Gene Dulaney	730	79%
Kevin Perry	184	21%
Total votes	914	100%

=== Ward 8 ===
2010 Auburn, Alabama municipal election – Ward 8
Candidate	Votes	%
Bob Norman	Unopposed	100%

== Election Summary ==
Position	Before election	After election	Image
Mayor	Bill Ham Jr.	Bill Ham Jr.	
Ward 1	Arthur L. Dowdell Sr.	Arthur L. Dowdell Sr.	
Ward 2	Sheila Eckman	Sheila Eckman	
Ward 3	Thomas Worden	Thomas Worden	
Ward 4	Brent Beard (Note: Beard was appointed to city council after the 2006 elections, not elected.)	Brent Beard	
Ward 5	Robin Kelley	Robin Kelley	
Ward 6	Dick Phelan	Dick Phelan	
Ward 7	Gene Dulaney	Gene Dulaney	
Ward 8	Bob Norman	Bob Norman	
