= James K. Haygood Jr. =

American politician

James Haygood Jr.
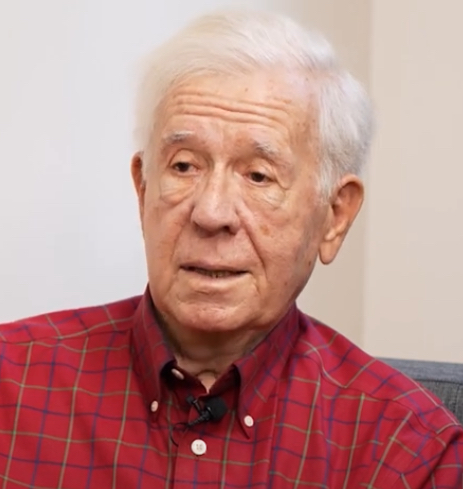

Mayor of Auburn, Alabama
- In office 1968–1976
- Preceded by: G. H. Wright
- Succeeded by: Donald E. Hayhurst

Personal details
- Born: April 1933 (age 92–93)
- Spouse: Sue Hinton (m. 1958)
- Education: Auburn University; University of Alabama

James Kern Haygood Jr. (born April 1933) is an American lawyer and politician who served as mayor of Auburn, Alabama from 1968 to 1976.

== Early life and education ==
Haygood was born in Union Springs, Alabama. He attended Auburn University, and the University of Alabama. He is a member of Pi Kappa Alpha. In 1958 and 1959, he was the assistant secretary to Congressman George W. Andrews.

== Political career ==
=== Mayor of Auburn ===
Haygood was first elected mayor in 1968, defeating the then-incumbent G.H. Wright. In 1969, he allowed the city to purchase radio slots for the purpose of announcing municipal bond referendums. In 1972, he received the most votes in the first round. In the runoff, he was reelected after defeating Wright in a runoff by over two hundred votes. The same year, he presented silver chafing dishes to the wives of Pat Sullivan and Terry Beasley.

In 1973, he made George Wallace and Lurleen Wallace honorary citizens of Auburn during an appreciation dinner.

During his time as mayor, he associated with many projects. In 1975, he oversaw the extension of the Auburn University Regional Airport. In April 1975, he criticized the private garbage collection system that Auburn used at that time. In 1976, he helped oversee the construction of the Alabama State Department of Agriculture and Industries laboratory on the Auburn University campus.

== Lawyer career ==
Haygood had an office in the Corner Bank from 1959 to 1972, while he worked on the law firm of H. W. Nixon. He served as the city attorney before being elected mayor in 1968. After his mayoral term, he founded his own law firm, Haygood Cleveland Pierce Thompson & Short. He retired on June 1, 2018.

== Personal life ==
He was married to Sue Hinton on February 2, 1958. In 2024, he spoke about his relation to Eugene Stanaland, the recipient of the 2024 Distinguished Veteran Award for Auburn Alabama. He and Stanaland served together on the city council from 1972 to 1976.
