= Jan Dempsey Community Arts Center =

Coordinates: 32.6137°N 85.4782°W

General information
- Location: Auburn, Alabama
- Address: 222 East Drake Avenue
- Country: United States
- Completed: 1999

The Jan Dempsey Community Arts Center is a performance venue and art gallery located in Auburn, Alabama. It was constructed in 1999 to promote visual art in Auburn.

== History ==
The building was constructed in 1999, and named after former mayor, Jan Dempsey.

The center went under renovation from January 2023 as part of a city-sponsored expansion project. The renovations were completed in March 2024.

== Events ==
The center hosts an art gallery with various art pieces. The gallery is managed by the Auburn Arts Association, and hosts exhibitions for artists to show off their various works.

Every summer, the center hosts a visual arts camp for children of any age.
