= Oak Bowery, Alabama =

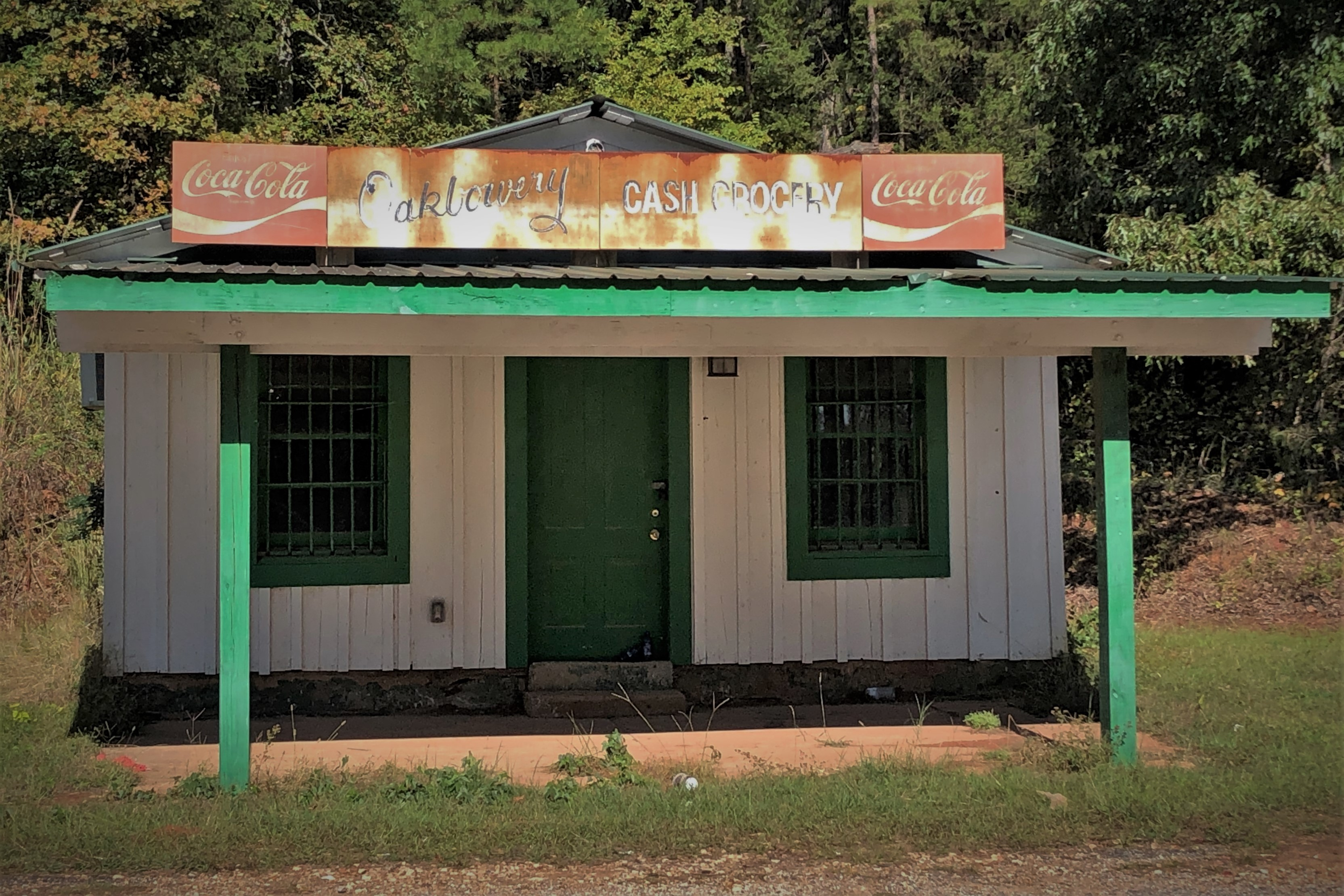
- The Oak Bowery Cash Grocery building in 2019.

- Location within Alabama Location within the United States
- Coordinates: 32°45′2″N 85°26′11″W
- Country: United States
- State: Alabama
- County: Chambers
- Elevation: 839 ft (256 m)
- Time zone: UTC-6 (Central (CST))
  - Summer (DST): UTC-5 (CDT)
- ZIP code: 36862
- Area code: 334

Oak Bowery is an unincorporated community in southern Chambers County, Alabama, United States. It lies along U.S. Route 431, north of Auburn.

== Demographics ==
Historical population
Census	Pop.	Note	%±
1880	120		—
U.S. Decennial Census

== History ==
Oak Bowery was first settled in 1828 by South Carolinians and was originally named Woodlawn. A Methodist camp meeting ground named Oak Bowery was established there soon after settlement, and the community adopted that name around 1835. In 1837, the Oak Bowery Female College was established, and in 1850 the East Alabama Masonic College located there. The community grew rapidly in the 1830s and 1840s, but a change in the planned routing of the Montgomery and West Point Railroad from Oak Bowery to a more southerly route ended the community's growth. Oak Bowery is today a small community of only a few residences and a church.

== Notable people ==
- Robert Lee Bullard - general, U.S. Army
- James Ferguson Dowdell - U.S. Representative
- James Render Dowdell - chief justice, Supreme Court of Alabama
- Samuel Porter Jones - evangelist
- John William Jones - U.S. Representative
- William J. Samford - Governor of Alabama
- W. T. Andrews - state representative

== Gallery ==
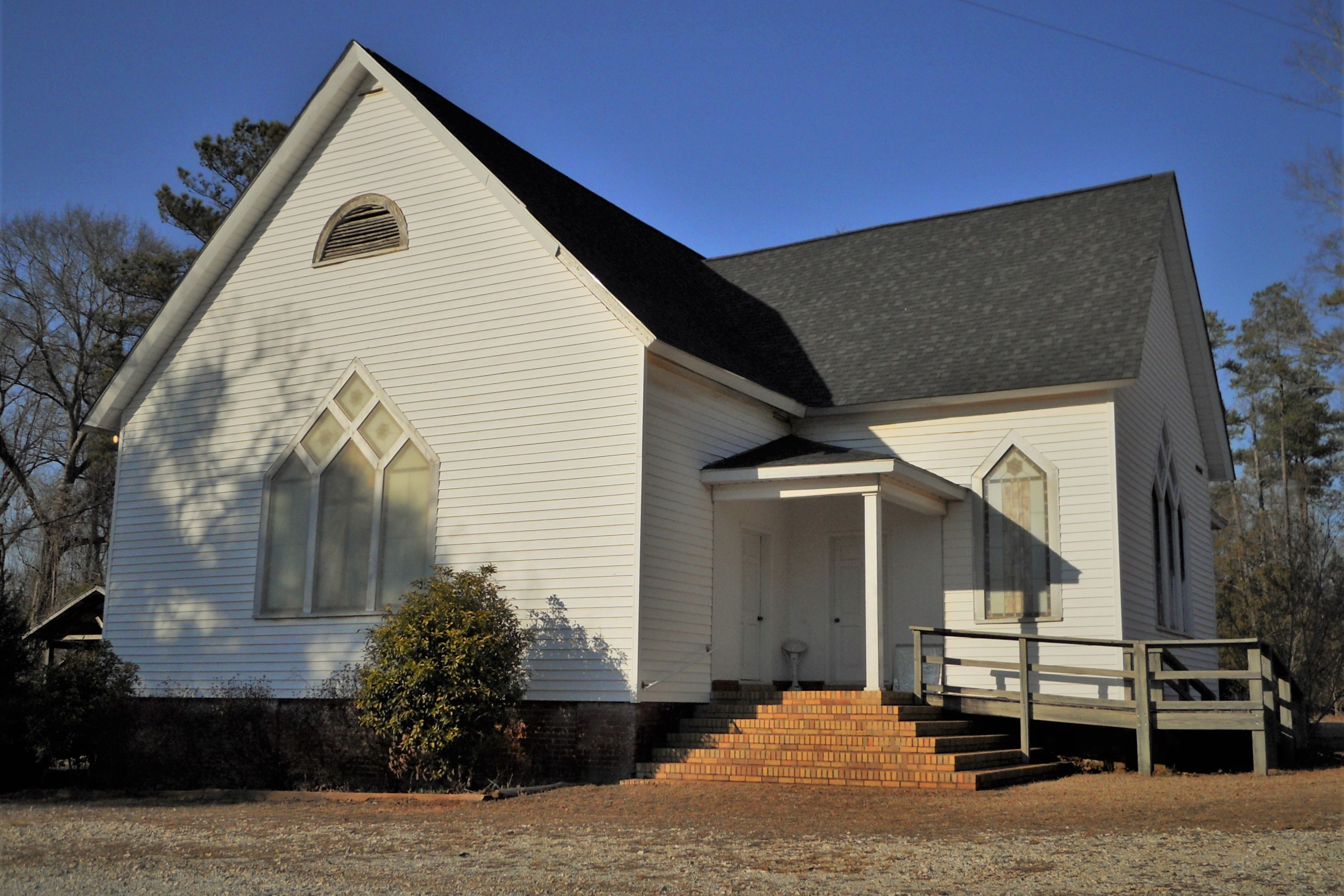
Oak Bowery United Methodist Church

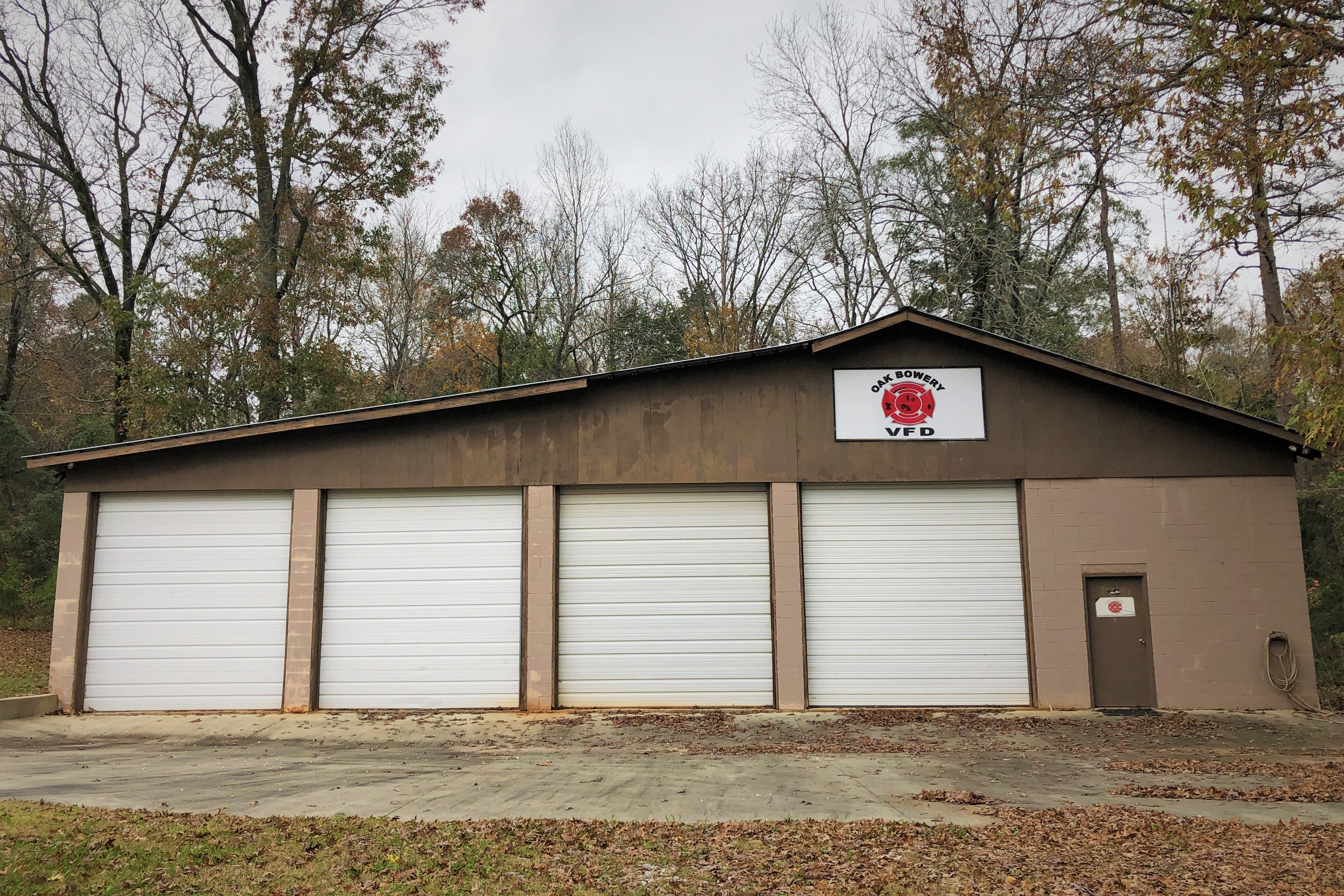
Oak Bowery Volunteer Fire Department

== Bibliography ==
- Miriam Ann Kirkwood Syler, "Oak Bowery, Historic Community", Lee County and Her Forebears. (Montgomery, Ala.: Herff Jones, 1983).
- Bob Crouch and Joe Harrington, Oak Bowery United Methodist Church , retrieved February 7, 2009.
- I. M. E. Blandin, History of Higher Education of Women in the South, Prior to 1860, (New York:, Neale Pub. Co., 1909), 112.
