= W. D. Copeland =

American politician

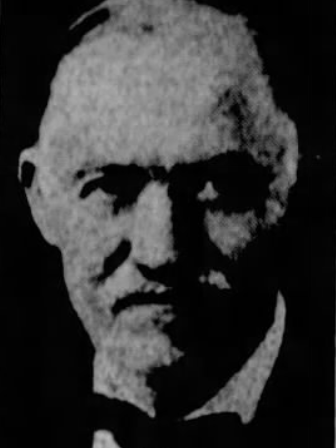
- Copeland in 1928

Mayor of Auburn, Alabama
- In office 1928–1936
- Preceded by: C. S. Yarbrough
- Succeeded by: C. S. Yarbrough

Mayor of Notasulga, Alabama

Personal details
- Died: March 6, 1948 (aged 77) Notasulga, Alabama, U.S.
- Spouse: Sarah Windham

William Daniel Copeland (died March 6, 1948) was an American politician and merchant. He served as the Mayor of Auburn, Alabama from 1928 to 1936.

== Career ==
Copeland served as the mayor of Notasulga, Alabama in the early 1900s. He quit his warehouse business and resigned from the position of mayor in August 1919 to move to Auburn, where he would send his children through school and founded the Economy Grocery.

=== Mayor of Auburn ===
He first ran for Mayor of Auburn, Alabama in 1926, where he was defeated by incumbent C. S. Yarbrough. He later defeated Yarbrough in 1928. In 1929, he announced plans to improve civic services in Auburn.

In 1931, he organized the yearly meeting for the Alabama League of Municipalities alongside Opelika mayor Henry K. Dickinson. In 1932, he welcomed letter carriers to the city when they were honored in a ceremony.

He ran for re-election unopposed in 1932.

In 1936, he served as the master of ceremonies on Auburn's 100th birthday. He ran for re-election against former mayor Yarbrough, in a rematch from 1926 and 1928. He was defeated by Yarbrough for the position.

Copeland played a leading role in establishing a fire department in Auburn.

== Personal life and death ==
Copeland was married to Sarah Windham. His father died in September 1936.

He died on March 6, 1948, in Notasulga, after a brief illness.
