= Eugene Stanaland =

American economics professor (born 1934)

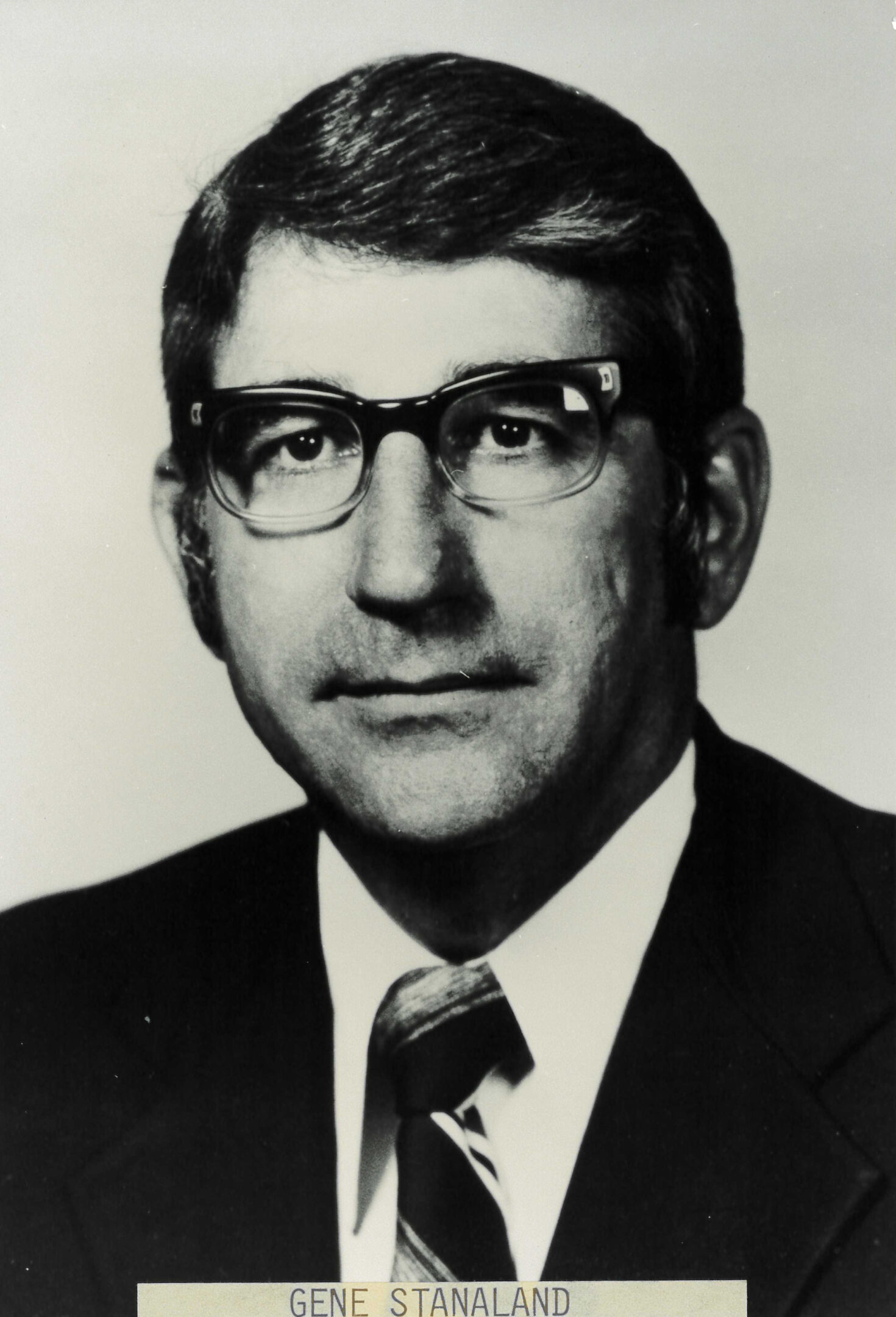
- Stanaland in 1972

City council president of Auburn, Alabama
- In office 1972–1976

Personal details
- Born: August 30, 1934 (age 92) New York City, New York
- Spouse: Phyllis Stanaland
- Education: Huntingdon College; University of Alabama

Eugene Edward Stanaland (born August 30, 1934) is an American economist, politician, and public speaker who served as treasurer and director for the Alabama Shakespeare Festival, as a board member of Huntingdon College, and as the head of economics at Auburn University. He served as the president of the Auburn, Alabama city council from 1972 to 1976.

== Early life and education ==
Stanaland graduated from Loretta High in 1952, and played on the football team. He graduated from Huntingdon College in 1960. He received his MBA and Ph.D from the University of Alabama.

== Career ==
Following high school, he enlisted in the Marine Corps, serving at Parris Island from 1953 to 1956. He rose to the rank of Sergeant, serving for three years during the Korean War.

He was president of the city council in Auburn after being elected in 1972. As a council president, he advocated for a 9-man city council and cooperation among officials. He ran again in 1976, running on examples of economic growth seen in the city throughout his 1972 term, including school funds increasing by 112 percent. He would end up losing his bid for re-election in 1976.

At the same time that he was president of the city council, he was also chair of the Auburn University Senate.

Huntingdon College honored Stanaland with its Alumni Loyalty Award in 2002. He has served on the Huntingdon College board of trustees from 1991 to 2019. In 2019, he was commemorated with the naming of the Phyllis and Eugene Stanaland Building, the name was later shortened to the Phyllis and Gene Stanaland House.

He has served as the board treasurer of the Alabama Shakespeare Festival since 1999 and was Senior Vice Commandant for Auburn's Billy Stelpflug Detachment of the Marine Corps League from 2002 to 2004, and currently has served in that position since 2023.

=== Economics career ===
Stanaland served as a professor of economics at Auburn University for over 20 years from 1960 to 1981. He participated in research on topics such as economic cost-benefit planning and breaking the pattern of poverty inheritance. In 1977, he discussed the film, The Free State of Winston, a documentary about the Republic of Winston, alongside H. Brandt Ayers, James Dickey, Paul Hemphill, and Kenneth E. Boulding.

Stanaland was the head of the economics department from 1972 to 1980. Before becoming a public speaker, he founded Gene Stanaland Enterprises, LLC, an economics and management consulting firm.

In public speaking, he was commonly known as the "Will Rogers of Economics" and included elements of humor when speaking. He spoke at the Auburn Rotary Club, Auburn University, Brooks International, the 2003 Radio Advertising Bureau’s Sales, Marketing & Leadership Conference, and Saginaw Valley State University among other conferences and gatherings.

In 1990, he predicted the housing market to grow by 3.6 to 3.9 percent.

In 1994, he defended the economic policy of the Bill Clinton administration, explaining how the tax increases and spending cuts would lower the federal debt.

== Personal life ==
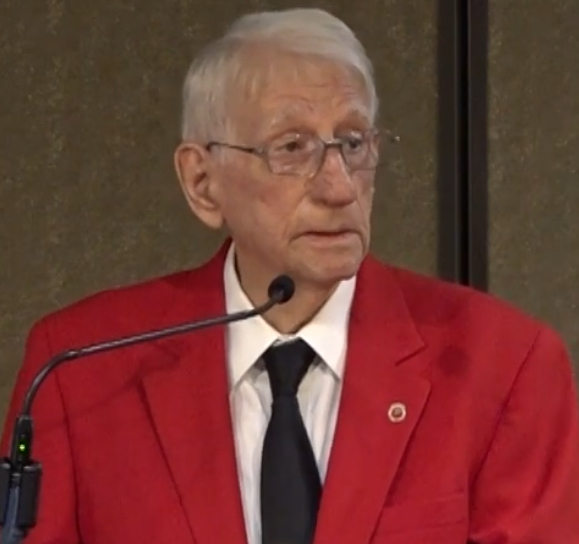
Stanaland delivering his acceptance speech for the Distinguished Veteran Award in 2024.

Stanaland was born in New York City, New York. His father was from Montgomery, Alabama, and his mother was from New York. His family moved to Detroit, then Baltimore, and finally settling down in Montgomery.

He is married to Phyllis Stanaland. He was honored with the City of Auburn's Distinguished Veteran Award on 27 May 2024. Following the presentation, a wreath-laying ceremony was held at the Auburn Veterans Memorial Monument.
