= Bill Ham Jr. =

Former mayor of Auburn, Alabama

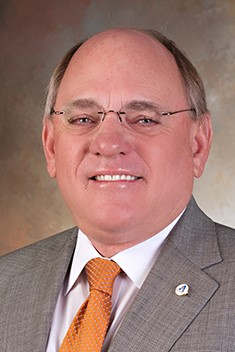

Mayor of Auburn, Alabama
- In office 1998–2018
- Preceded by: Jan Dempsey
- Succeeded by: Ron Anders Jr.

Auburn city council — Ward 4, Place 2 (Note: When he was first elected, the seat was titled District 4, Post 2 before being changed to Ward 4, Place 2 in 1990.)
- In office 1986–1998

Personal details
- Born: September 26, 1953 (age 72)
- Spouse: Carol Susan (m. 1979)

William Forrester Ham Jr. (born September 26, 1953) is an American politician who served as the mayor of Auburn, Alabama from 1998 to 2018.

== Early life and education ==
Bill Ham attended Auburn University in 1972, graduating with a Bachelor's degree in recreational management in 1977.

== Political career ==
In 1986, Ham first got into the public sphere in Auburn after the mayor at the time, Jan Dempsey, suggested that he make a run for city council, and he did. That year he defeated J. Quillin for Auburn's District 4 council seat where he served until 1998. In 1994, he was voted in as Mayor Pro Tempore by the city council.

Ham ran for mayor in 1998, holding office until 2018. One of his major accomplishments as mayor was helping create the Auburn Research Park which is home to The Edward Via College of Osteopathic Medicine and other businesses, providing a space for collaboration between Auburn University and the city.

== Personal life ==
Ham married Carol Ham on June 9, 1979. She taught with Auburn City Schools for over 30 years. Ham's father Bill Ham Sr. also graduated from Auburn University and served on the Auburn City Council.
