= C. S. Yarbrough =

American politician

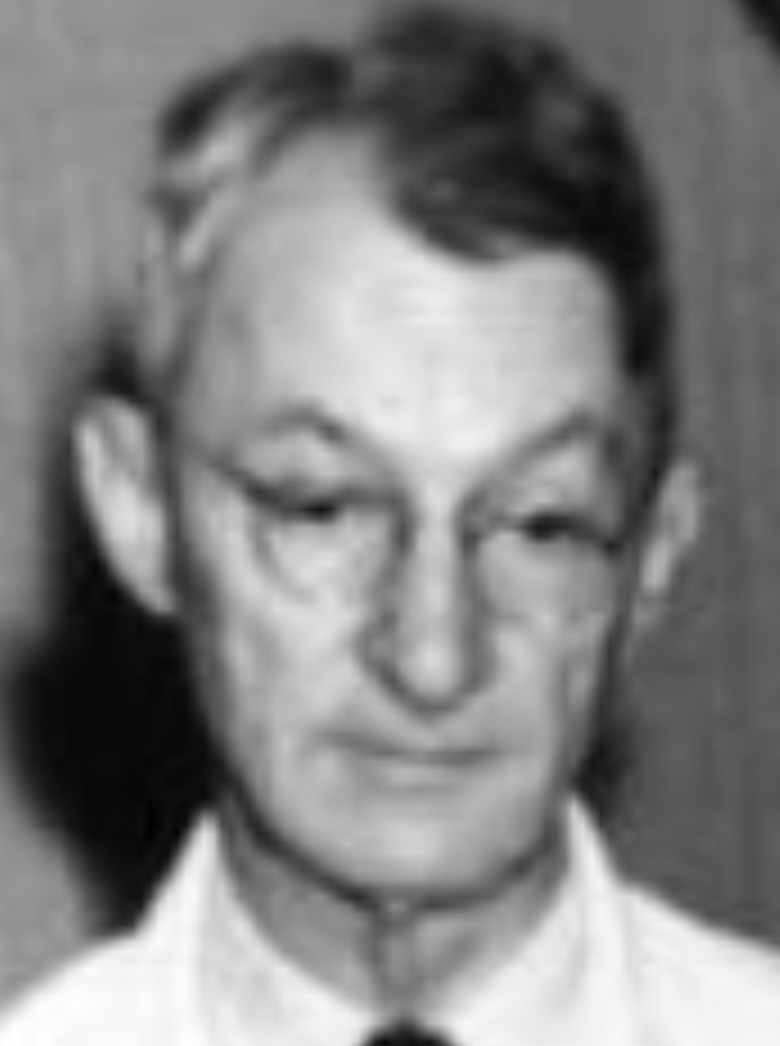
- Yarbrough in 1938

Mayor of Auburn, Alabama
- In office October 1, 1936 – 1944
- Preceded by: W. D. Copeland
- Succeeded by: G. H. Wright
- In office October 10, 1922 – 1928
- Preceded by: J. W. Wright
- Succeeded by: W. D. Copeland
- In office March 26, 1918 – August 16, 1918
- Preceded by: G. N. Mitcham
- Succeeded by: S. L. Toomer

Member of the Alabama House of Representatives from Lee County
- In office 1914–1916 Serving with W. T. Andrews

Member of the Auburn, Alabama City Council
- In office 1907–1916

Personal details
- Born: March 10, 1878 Orion, Alabama, U.S.
- Died: October 28, 1946 (aged 68) Auburn, Alabama, U.S.
- Spouse: Bertha Mae (m. 1903)

Cecil Sentell Yarbrough (March 10, 1878 – October 28, 1946) was an American politician, physician, and surgeon. A member of the Democratic Party, he was elected to the Alabama House of Representatives in 1914, and served as the Mayor of Auburn, Alabama in 1918, 1922 to 1928, and 1936 to 1944.

== Early life and education ==
Yarbrough was born in Orion, Alabama to Joseph S. and Jane Yarbrough. He attended the University of Tennessee for his M.D. degree, graduating in 1901. He then took postgraduate courses at the University of Chicago in 1905.

== Professional career ==
Yarbrough worked as a physician and surgeon in the early 1900s, in LaFayette, Alabama.

In 1911, he founded a $1,000 scholarship for students at Auburn University. He announced the scholarship during graduation of that year.

== Political career ==
Yarbrough first served on the Auburn, Alabama City Council in 1907, a position that he served in until 1916.

=== State representative ===
He was elected to the Alabama House of Representatives in 1914, alongside W. T. Andrews. In the House, he served as the chairman of the public health committee. During that time, he was an advocate for the medical association. He engaged in a physical altercation on the floor of the Alabama Senate with physician and representative R. S. Hill. In 1918, he spoke about his time in the legislature and claimed that he was "through with politics."

=== Mayor of Auburn, Alabama ===
Yarbrough first served as the Mayor of Auburn, Alabama in 1918, after the resignation of G. N. Mitcham. He resigned from the post on August 16, 1918. He was first elected in 1922, and inaugurated on October 10, 1922. He was re-elected on September 21, 1926. He was defeated by W. D. Copeland in 1928, whom he later defeated in a 1936 rematch. He served until 1944.

== Personal life and death ==
Yarbrough married Bertha Mae on March 18, 1903. He died on October 28, 1946, after a long illness.
