= Burton House =

Burton House may refer to:

== Places ==
=== United States ===
- P. D. Burton House, Lewisville, AR, listed on the NRHP in Arkansas
- Robert Wilton Burton House, Auburn, AL, listed on the NRHP in Alabama
- Burton House (Lavonia, Georgia), listed on the NRHP in Georgia
- The Burton, Indianapolis, Indiana, a building listed on the NRHP in Indianapolis, Indiana
- Burton House (Chestnut Grove, Kentucky), listed on the NRHP in Kentucky
- Ambrose Burton House, Harrodsburg, KY, listed on the NRHP in Kentucky
- David Burton House, Shelbyville, KY, listed on the NRHP in Kentucky
- Burton-Conner_House. Cambridge, MA
- Burton, Benjamin, Garrison Site, Cushing, ME, listed on the NRHP in Maine
- Burton-Rosenmeier House, Little Falls, MN, listed on the NRHP in Minnesota
- William H. Burton House, Waterloo, NY, listed on the NRHP in New York
- Burton House (Newberry, South Carolina), listed on the NRHP in South Carolina
- Burton House (Hurley, Wisconsin)

=== United Kingdom ===
- Burton Court, Eardisland, a wedding and conference venue in north Herefordshire
- Burton Court, Linton, a grade II listed house in south Herefordshire
- Burton’s Court, a park in Chelsea, London
