= Burton Court, Herefordshire =

Burton Court, Herefordshire may refer to:

== Places ==
=== United Kingdom ===
- Burton Court, Eardisland, a wedding and conference venue in north Herefordshire
- Burton Court, Linton, a grade II listed house in south Herefordshire
