= Christchurch Street =

Street in Chelsea, London

Coordinates: 51.48652°N 0.16267°W

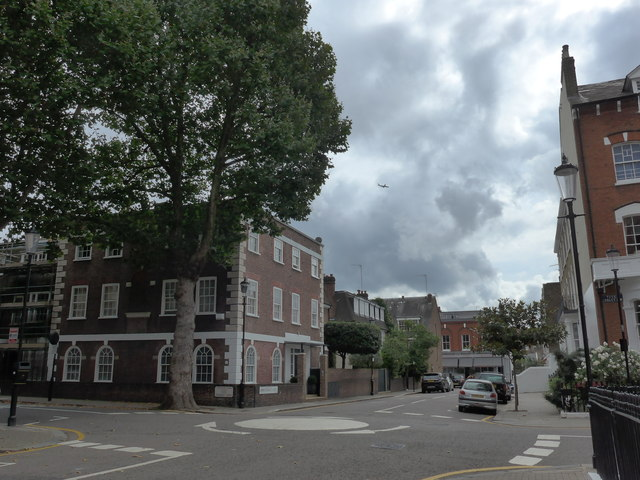
Junction of Christchurch Street and Tite Street, 2014

Christchurch Street is a street in Chelsea, London.

It runs roughly south-west to north-east from a t-junction with Royal Hospital Road to another where it meets Durham Place, Chelsea and Ormonde Gate, facing the open space of Burton's Court.

It also has junctions with Ralston Street, Tite Street and Christchurch Terrace.

The street is mostly residential, with one pub, The Surprise.

In 1971–72, the Cadogan Estate obtained planning permission to redevelop the Christchurch Street and Tedworth Square area, and in 1974 began demolishing houses. However, local campaigners and conservationists were able to get 26-52 and 60-76 Christchurch Street listed and stop the planned construction of two tower blocks of 33 storeys, 159 houses, and a 3-storeyed garage for 294 cars. In the House of Lords, William Cadogan, 7th Earl Cadogan called the terrace "nasty cheap little houses that were built a long time ago".

30-52 form a mid-19th century terrace of houses that have been grade II listed since 1974.

The actors Laurence Olivier and Vivien Leigh lived together at Durham Cottage, 4 Christchurch Street, from 1937 to 1956.

No 4 christchurch street chelsea has had a reconstruction project with new basement. GS construction did the internal demolition, basement dig, new steel frame, interior timber work etc then ARK construction finished it off eventually transforming the house into what is like a very expensive grand design. Research ARK construction to see Durham cottage building work photos.
