= National Register of Historic Places listings in Lee County, Alabama =

Location of Lee County in Alabama

This is a list of the National Register of Historic Places listings in Lee County, Alabama.

This is intended to be a complete list of the properties and districts on the National Register of Historic Places in Lee County, Alabama, United States. Latitude and longitude coordinates are provided for many National Register properties and districts; these locations may be seen together in a Google map.

There are 26 properties and districts listed on the National Register in the county.

This National Park Service list is complete through NPS recent listings posted May 1, 2026.

== Current listings ==
	Name on the Register	Image	Date listed	Location	City or town	Description
1	Auburn Players Theater	Auburn Players Theater	May 22, 1973 (#73000351)	139 S. College Street; 32°36′16″N 85°28′53″W	Auburn	Also known as the Auburn University Chapel
2	Auburn University Historic District	Auburn University Historic District	June 3, 1976 (#76000338)	Auburn University campus 32°36′17″N 85°28′58″W	Auburn	
3	Robert Wilton Burton House	Robert Wilton Burton House	May 8, 1980 (#80000701)	315 E. Magnolia Ave. 32°36′24″N 85°28′39″W	Auburn	Queen Anne-style house built in 1885, significant for its association with poet Robert Wilton Burton. The house was dismantled in 1993.
4	Cullars Rotation	Cullars Rotation	April 18, 2003 (#03000231)	Woodfield Dr., east of U.S. Route 29; 32°35′19″N 85°29′01″W	Auburn	
5	Dr. J.W. Darden House	Dr. J.W. Darden House	August 12, 2009 (#09000605)	1323 Auburn St. 32°38′16″N 85°23′01″W	Opelika	
6	Ebenezer Missionary Baptist Church	Ebenezer Missionary Baptist Church	April 21, 1975 (#75000317)	Thach St. and Auburn Dr., S. 32°36′14″N 85°28′24″W	Auburn	The building now houses the Auburn Unitarian Universalist Fellowship
7	Geneva Street Historic District	Geneva Street Historic District	September 15, 1987 (#87000981)	Roughly bounded by S. 7th, Glenn, Stowe, Geneva, and S. 10th Sts., and Ave. C 32°38′32″N 85°22′30″W	Opelika	
8	Jenkins Farmhouse	Jenkins Farmhouse	January 15, 2008 (#07001390)	1190 County Road 38; 32°27′58″N 85°21′17″W	Dupree	
9	Lee County Courthouse	Lee County Courthouse	July 23, 1973 (#73000353)	S. 9th St. between Aves. A and B 32°38′45″N 85°22′46″W	Opelika	
10	Loachapoka Historic District	Loachapoka Historic District	May 11, 1973 (#73000352)	Both sides of State Route 14 in Loachapoka; 32°36′16″N 85°35′37″W	Loachapoka	
11	Lowther House Complex	Lowther House Complex	September 16, 1993 (#93000986)	County Road 318; 32°32′35″N 85°03′14″W	Smiths Station	
12	Dr. Andrew D. McLain Office and Drug Store	Dr. Andrew D. McLain Office and Drug Store	February 3, 1983 (#83002978)	Main and Crawford Sts. 32°35′46″N 85°14′18″W	Salem	The Dr. Andrew D. McLain Office and Drug Store was destroyed by an EF2 tornado on February 28, 2009.
13	Noble Hall	Noble Hall	March 24, 1972 (#72000163)	3 miles north of Auburn on Shelton Mill Rd. 32°38′23″N 85°27′55″W	Auburn	Otherwise known as the Frazer-Brown-Pearson Home.
14	Northside Historic District	Northside Historic District	December 31, 2001 (#01001409)	Roughly bounded by 7th Ave., 3rd St., 2nd Ave., and N. 11th St. 32°39′04″N 85°23′00″W	Opelika	
15	Old Main and Church Street Historic District	Old Main and Church Street Historic District	October 19, 1978 (#78003194)	Roughly bounded by E. Drake Ave., the former Western Railway of Alabama line, N. Gay St., N. College St. and Bragg Ave. and Warrior Ct. 32°36′42″N 85°28′55″W	Auburn	
16	Old President's Mansion	Old President's Mansion	August 29, 2003 (#03000423)	Located on the Thach Ave. concourse on the campus of Auburn University; 32°36′12″N 85°29′06″W	Auburn	Now known as Katherine Cooper Cater Hall
17	Old Rotation	Old Rotation	January 14, 1988 (#87002390)	Auburn University campus 32°35′36″N 85°29′09″W	Auburn	
18	Pepperell Mill and Mill Village Historic District	Pepperell Mill and Mill Village Historic District	March 31, 2014 (#14000090)	Pepperell Pkwy., 28th St. N., 1st Ave. & 30th St. N. 32°38′06″N 85°25′13″W	Opelika	
19	Railroad Avenue Historic District	Railroad Avenue Historic District	August 30, 1984 (#84000640)	Roughly bounded by 7th and 10th Sts., 1st Ave., and Ave. B 32°38′50″N 85°22′48″W	Opelika	
20	Scott-Yarbrough House	Scott-Yarbrough House	April 16, 1975 (#75000318)	101 DeBardeleben St. 32°36′23″N 85°28′21″W	Auburn	Otherwise known as "Pebble Hill" or The Caroline Marshall Draughon Center for the Arts & Humanities
21	Spring Villa	Spring Villa	January 3, 1978 (#78000494)	6 miles (9.6 km) southeast of Opelika on Spring Villa Rd. 32°35′16″N 85°18′42″W	Opelika	
22	Summers Plantation	Summers Plantation	February 21, 1991 (#91000095)	475 County Road 181; 32°40′06″N 85°16′19″W	Opelika	
23	Sunny Slope	Sunny Slope	March 12, 2009 (#08001116)	1031 S. College St. 32°35′10″N 85°29′13″W	Auburn	
24	U.S. Post Office	U.S. Post Office	June 21, 1983 (#83002979)	144 Tichenor Ave. 32°36′29″N 85°28′49″W	Auburn	
25	U.S. Post Office	U.S. Post Office	November 18, 1976 (#76000339)	701 Ave. A 32°38′53″N 85°22′38″W	Opelika	
26	Franklin Yarbrough, Jr. Store	Franklin Yarbrough, Jr. Store	June 29, 1989 (#89000309)	County Highway 68; 32°42′40″N 85°11′02″W	Beulah	Also known as The Roger Brown Memorial Rock House Museum

== See also ==
- List of National Historic Landmarks in Alabama
- National Register of Historic Places listings in Alabama
