= Thomas Brewster =

Thomas Brewster may refer to:

- Thomas Brewster (translator) (1705–1764), English doctor and translator
- Tom Brewster (born 1974), Scottish curler
