= Cullars Rotation =

- U.S. National Register of Historic Places
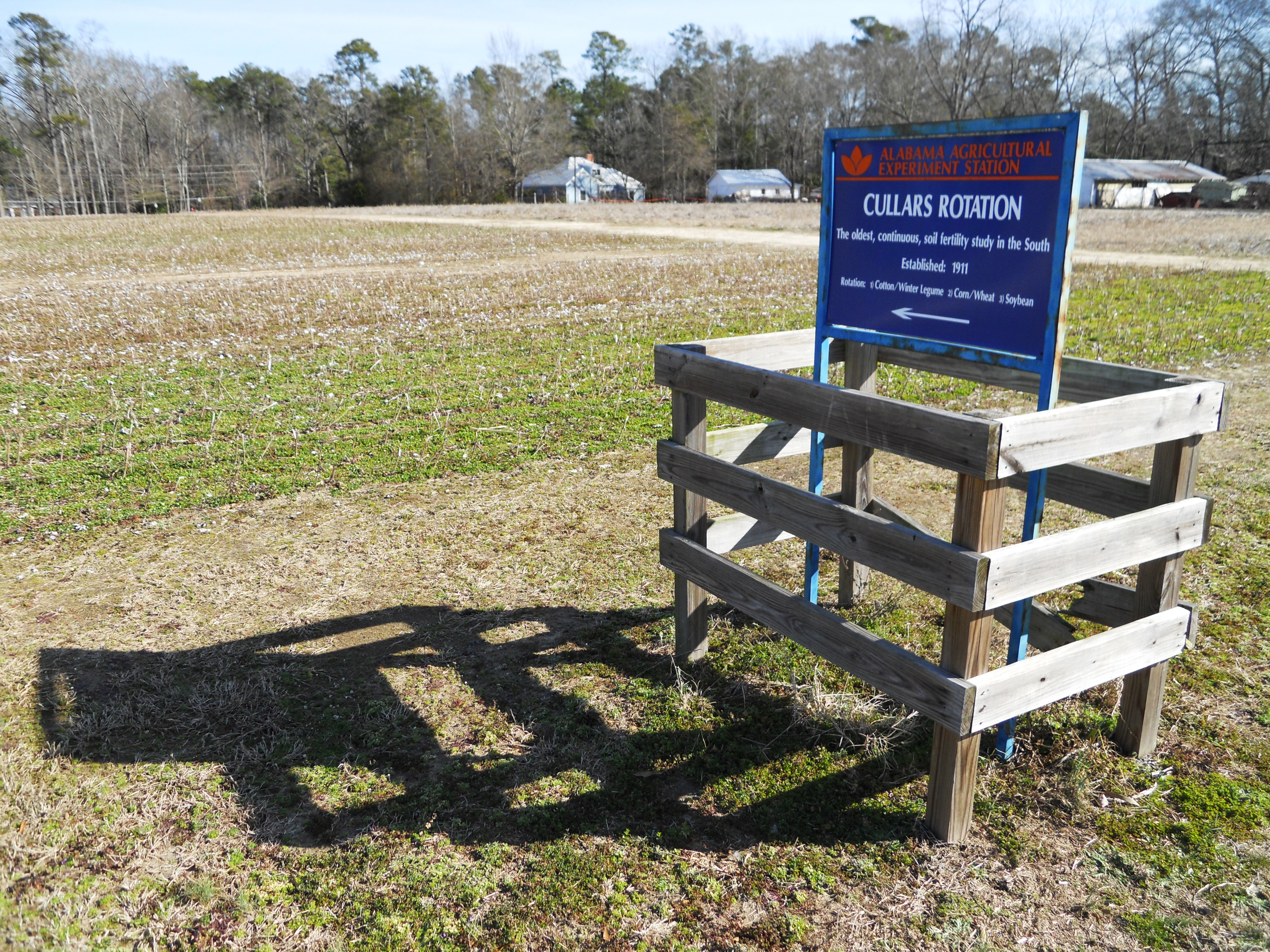
- Cullars Rotation is the oldest continuous soil fertility experiment in the Southeastern United States. Cullars Rotation is located on the campus of Auburn University directly behind the Jule Collins Smith Museum of Fine Art.

- Location within Alabama Location within the United States
- Location: Woodfield Dr., E of US 29, Auburn, Alabama
- Coordinates: 32°35′19″N 85°29′1″W
- Built: 1911
- NRHP reference No.: 03000231
- Added to NRHP: April 18, 2003

Crops under experimental cultivation in 2017

The Cullars Rotation is a soil fertility experiment on the Auburn University campus in Auburn, Alabama and is listed on the National Register of Historic Places. The Cullars Rotation experiment, which started in 1911, is the oldest ongoing cotton fertility experiment in the United States, the oldest soil fertility experiment in the Southern United States, and the second oldest continuous cotton experiment in the world.

== History ==
In the late 19th century, the land on which the Cullars Rotation sits was used in a number of agricultural experiments, including one that established the disease cotton rust was caused by a deficiency of potassium. In 1911, the Alabama Legislature set aside money for an experiment to study the long-term effects of fertilization on a three-year rotation of cotton, corn, and wheat and soybeans. The Cullars site was chosen for this study and the experiment has continued unabated since. In 1938, the site was purchased by the Alabama Polytechnic Institute, which administered the study. In 2001, the portion of the Cullars site not occupied by the Cullars Rotation was landscaped as the grounds of the Jule Collins Smith Museum of Fine Art; however, a 40-foot buffer is maintained between the museum grounds and the rotation to ensure experimental integrity.

== Experiment ==
The Cullars Rotation consists of three sets of 14 soil treatments, with one set of treatments for each of the three crops (cotton, corn, and wheat and soybeans) in the rotation. Each treatment fills a roughly 2000 square foot (184 m²) plot, with a two-foot (60 cm) buffer between plots. The 14 soil treatments are:

1. Legumes planted, but no nitrogen fertilizer
2. No legumes or nitrogen fertilizer
3. Nothing added to soil
4. Nitrogen fertilizer added, but no winter legumes
5. No phosphorus added
6. No micronutrients added
7. Excess potassium added
8. Rock phosphate added
9. No potassium added
10. Two-thirds of regular amount of potassium added
11. No lime added
12. No sulfur added
13. Complete fertilization with micronutrients
14. One-third of regular amount of potassium added

Continuous farming of the plots which have not been given treatments have made certain sections of the Cullars Rotation some of the most nutrient poor soil in the United States.

== Miscellaneous ==
The Cullars Rotation is located east of the grounds of the Jule Collins Smith Museum of Fine Art at the corner of College Street and Woodfield Drive in Auburn. As an ongoing experiment, the Rotation is not open to the public, but can be viewed from the museum grounds. The Rotation was placed on the National Register of Historic Places on May 18, 2003.

== See also ==
- Old Rotation - A similar nearby agricultural rotation experiment
- National Register of Historic Places listings in Lee County, Alabama
