= Alabama Book Festival =

Coordinates: 34°0′41″N 85°59′55″W

The Alabama Book Festival is an annual literary festival held since 2006 in Montgomery, Alabama, USA. In the past, it has been sponsored by the Alabama Center for the Book (formerly on the Auburn University campus, in the Caroline Marshall Draughon Center for the Arts & Humanities and now at the University of Alabama). Since 2010, it is underwritten by, among others, the Alabama Writers' Forum, the Alabama Humanities Foundation, the Alabama Library Association, Alabama Public Television, the Alabama State Council on the Arts, New South Books, and Regions Bank. The festival features writers, publishing companies, and local artists, including musicians and print makers.
