= Opelika, Alabama =

- City
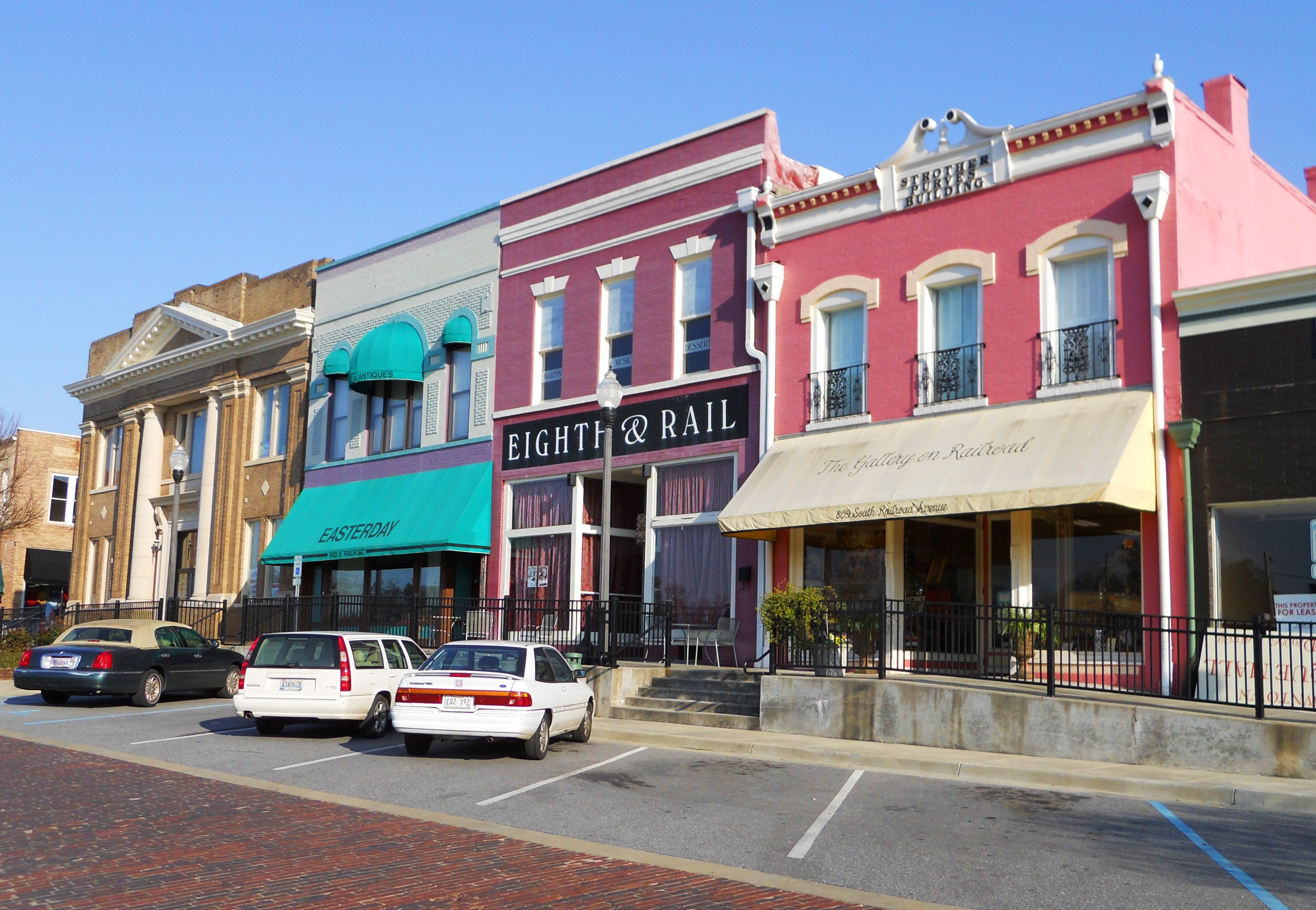
- Downtown Opelika
- Motto: "Rich in Heritage With a Vision for the Future"
- Location of Opelika in Lee County, Alabama
- Coordinates: 32°38′43″N 85°22′42″W
- Country: United States
- State: Alabama
- County: Lee
- Established: 1854

Government
  - Mayor: Eddie Smith

Area
  - City: 62.16 sq mi (161.00 km^{2})
  - Land: 61.15 sq mi (158.39 km^{2})
  - Water: 1.01 sq mi (2.62 km^{2})
- Elevation: 807 ft (246 m)

Population (2020)
  - City: 30,995
  - Density: 506.8/sq mi (195.69/km^{2})
  - Urban: 100,842
  - Metro: 174,271
- Time zone: UTC-6 (Central (CST))
  - Summer (DST): UTC-5 (CDT)
- ZIP codes: 36801-36804
- Area code: 334
- FIPS code: 01-57048
- GNIS feature ID: 2404435
- Website: www.opelika-al.gov

Opelika (pronounced /ˌoʊpəˈlaɪkə/ OH-pə-LY-kə) is a city and the county seat of Lee County in the east-central part of the U.S. state of Alabama. It is a principal city of the Auburn-Opelika Metropolitan Area. As of the 2020 census, the population of Opelika is 30,995, an increase of 17.1 percent from the 2010 Census where the population was 26,477. The Auburn-Opelika, AL MSA with a population of 174,241, along with the Columbus, Georgia metropolitan area, comprises the Greater Columbus combined statistical area, a region home to 501,649 residents.

== History ==
The Opelika area was first settled in 1832 after the Treaty of Cusseta was signed by the U.S. government and the Creek Nation. This treaty placed the land, and all other Creek territories east of the Mississippi River, under the possession of the United States government. Though the territory now belonged to the U.S., Opelika kept its Creek name, which translates to "large swamp", from opilwa (swamp) and lako (big).

Two decades after settlement, Opelika was chartered as a town on February 9, 1854, thanks to its rapid growth. This growth was due to the Montgomery & West Point Railroad Company's rail lines, which traversed the town and served as major means of transportation for unprocessed cotton between the northern and southern territories.

By the start of the Civil War 1861, Opelika was a developing railroad town. Due to being served by the Montgomery and West Point Railroad, Opelika was able to supply troops, agricultural goods, and other supplies for the Confederacy States of America (CSA). As was common in much of the CSA, Opelika's civilian population experienced shortages and economic strain during the war. Food and goods were diverted to support soldiers, and the community faced social and financial disruptions. Many men from Opelika and surrounding Lee County enlisted in Confederate military units, including infantry and cavalry regiments raised within Alabama. These soldiers participated in campaigns throughout the Western Theater of the war, including engagements in Mississippi, Tennessee, and Georgia. The presence of the railroad made Opelika a conduit for Confederate logistics, which was a target of raids and sabotage by Union forces targeting Southern infrastructure. Opelika was a significant location for the Confederate Army base. The city was a hub for the Macon and involved Major General Lovell Rousseau's Union cavalry raid into Alabama. The raid aimed to disrupt Confederate supply lines and was a part of the Union strategy to capture Atlanta, which was crucial for the war effort. The battle resulted in the destruction of the railroad infrastructure and the loss of supplies for the Confederate forces in Atlanta. The Union cavalry then turned northeast to join General Sherman's Army advancing towards Atlanta.

Opelika later received a new charter in 1870, and its rapid growth continued. The town nearly doubled in size between 1870 and 1900.

Opelika's downtown was packed with saloons catering to railroad workers and other men. Frequent gunfire in the street by intoxicated patrons resulted in railroads directing their passengers to duck beneath the windows when their trains passed through the town.

In 1882, two factions claimed to rule the city government, one known as the "Bar room" headed by Mayor Dunbar, a saloon keeper, and another known as the "Citizens". In a riot in late November–December of that year, a dozen men were wounded. In the end, a few were killed. The Citizens had claimed control of the city via the elections, but Dunbar refused to give up. After continued violence, the state legislature revoked the city's charter and the governor sent in the militia to restore order. The legislature appointed five commissioners to manage the city, a situation that continued until 1899. That year, the legislature restored the city's charter.

== Geography ==
=== Climate ===
Climate data for Opelika, Alabama, 1991–2020 normals, extremes 1957–present
Month	Jan	Feb	Mar	Apr	May	Jun	Jul	Aug	Sep	Oct	Nov	Dec	Year
Record high °F (°C)	80 (27)	84 (29)	89 (32)	91 (33)	97 (36)	101 (38)	103 (39)	103 (39)	99 (37)	98 (37)	88 (31)	81 (27)	103 (39)
Mean maximum °F (°C)	71.3 (21.8)	74.3 (23.5)	81.0 (27.2)	84.5 (29.2)	89.9 (32.2)	93.8 (34.3)	95.5 (35.3)	95.6 (35.3)	92.2 (33.4)	86.2 (30.1)	78.4 (25.8)	73.1 (22.8)	96.8 (36.0)
Mean daily maximum °F (°C)	55.6 (13.1)	59.5 (15.3)	67.0 (19.4)	74.1 (23.4)	81.1 (27.3)	86.8 (30.4)	89.5 (31.9)	88.5 (31.4)	84.2 (29.0)	75.1 (23.9)	65.8 (18.8)	57.8 (14.3)	73.7 (23.2)
Daily mean °F (°C)	44.3 (6.8)	47.8 (8.8)	54.6 (12.6)	61.3 (16.3)	69.4 (20.8)	76.1 (24.5)	79.3 (26.3)	78.6 (25.9)	73.5 (23.1)	62.9 (17.2)	53.0 (11.7)	46.6 (8.1)	62.3 (16.8)
Mean daily minimum °F (°C)	33.0 (0.6)	36.1 (2.3)	42.1 (5.6)	48.5 (9.2)	57.7 (14.3)	65.4 (18.6)	69.1 (20.6)	68.6 (20.3)	62.9 (17.2)	50.6 (10.3)	40.2 (4.6)	35.4 (1.9)	50.8 (10.5)
Mean minimum °F (°C)	16.4 (−8.7)	20.4 (−6.4)	25.0 (−3.9)	32.6 (0.3)	42.3 (5.7)	55.9 (13.3)	62.5 (16.9)	60.4 (15.8)	50.0 (10.0)	34.7 (1.5)	25.6 (−3.6)	20.7 (−6.3)	14.3 (−9.8)
Record low °F (°C)	−7 (−22)	5 (−15)	11 (−12)	25 (−4)	33 (1)	37 (3)	48 (9)	52 (11)	36 (2)	26 (−3)	16 (−9)	1 (−17)	−7 (−22)
Average precipitation inches (mm)	5.05 (128)	5.33 (135)	5.50 (140)	4.79 (122)	4.01 (102)	4.50 (114)	4.77 (121)	4.36 (111)	3.34 (85)	3.61 (92)	4.27 (108)	5.67 (144)	55.20 (1,402)
Average snowfall inches (cm)	0.0 (0.0)	0.0 (0.0)	0.0 (0.0)	0.0 (0.0)	0.0 (0.0)	0.0 (0.0)	0.0 (0.0)	0.0 (0.0)	0.0 (0.0)	0.0 (0.0)	0.0 (0.0)	0.0 (0.0)	0.0 (0.0)
Average precipitation days (≥ 0.01 in)	9.7	9.0	8.4	7.8	7.1	9.5	10.3	8.9	6.5	6.0	6.8	9.7	99.7
Average snowy days (≥ 0.1 in)	0.1	0.0	0.0	0.0	0.0	0.0	0.0	0.0	0.0	0.0	0.0	0.0	0.1
Source 1: NOAA
Source 2: National Weather Service

== Demographics ==
Historical population
Census	Pop.	Note	%±
1880	3,245		—
1890	3,703		14.1%
1900	4,245		14.6%
1910	4,734		11.5%
1920	4,960		4.8%
1930	6,156		24.1%
1940	8,487		37.9%
1950	12,295		44.9%
1960	15,678		27.5%
1970	19,027		21.4%
1980	21,896		15.1%
1990	22,122		1.0%
2000	23,498		6.2%
2010	26,477		12.7%
2020	30,995		17.1%
2025 (est.)	35,765	▲	15.4%
U.S. Decennial Census

=== 2020 census ===
As of the 2020 census, Opelika had a population of 30,995; there were 11,866 households and 7,199 families in the city. The median age was 37.6 years. 22.9% of residents were under the age of 18 and 17.3% were 65 years of age or older. For every 100 females there were 91.6 males, and for every 100 females age 18 and over there were 87.7 males age 18 and over.

83.9% of residents lived in urban areas, while 16.1% lived in rural areas.

There were 12,553 households in Opelika, of which 30.5% had children under the age of 18 living in them. Of all households, 41.9% were married-couple households, 18.1% were households with a male householder and no spouse or partner present, and 34.7% were households with a female householder and no spouse or partner present. About 29.0% of all households were made up of individuals and 11.8% had someone living alone who was 65 years of age or older.

There were 13,469 housing units, of which 6.8% were vacant. The homeowner vacancy rate was 1.6% and the rental vacancy rate was 6.3%.

Opelika racial composition
Race	Num.	Perc.
White (non-Hispanic)	14,836	47.87%
Black or African American (non-Hispanic)	11,947	38.54%
Native American	39	0.13%
Asian	692	2.23%
Pacific Islander	14	0.05%
Other/Mixed	1,060	3.42%
Hispanic or Latino	2,407	7.77%

Racial composition as of the 2020 census
Race	Number	Percent
White	15,125	48.8%
Black or African American	12,011	38.8%
American Indian and Alaska Native	177	0.6%
Asian	692	2.2%
Native Hawaiian and Other Pacific Islander	15	0.0%
Some other race	1,596	5.1%
Two or more races	1,379	4.4%
Hispanic or Latino (of any race)	2,407	7.8%

=== 2010 census ===
According to 2024 Census estimates, the median income for a household in the city was $58,763.

The per capita income for the city is $33,505. Residents with income under poverty levels are 15%.

== Economy ==
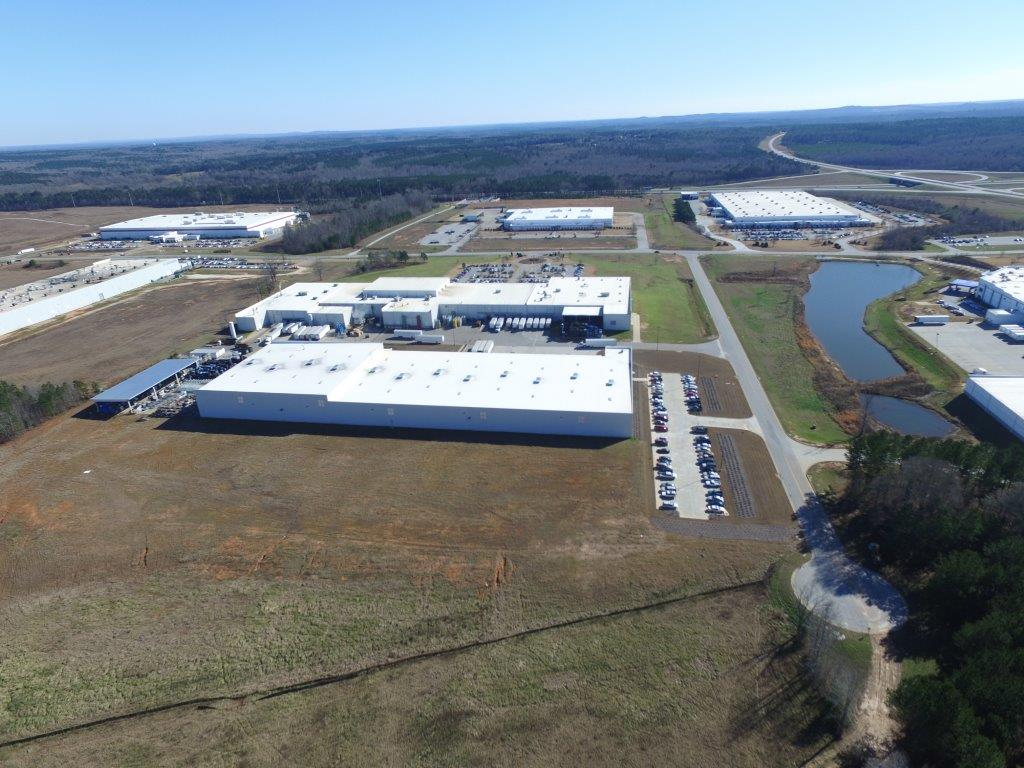
Northeast Opelika Industrial Park

Since 2005, the city experienced new industry investments and existing industry expansions totalling more than $2.6 billion and the creation of over 4,700 additional jobs.

Opelika's largest employer is East Alabama Health, which employs more than 3,700 employees.

== Arts and culture ==
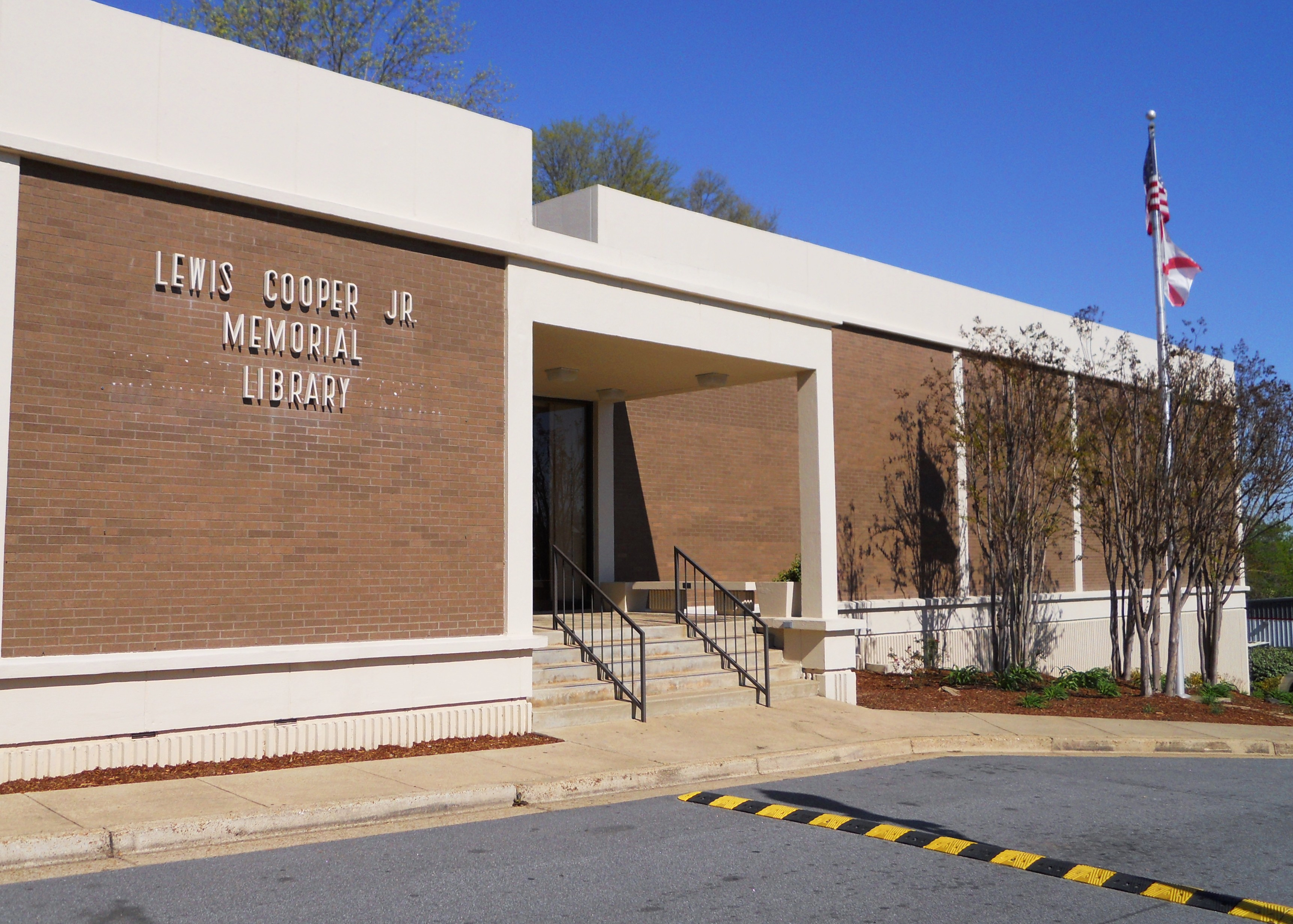
Lewis Cooper Jr Memorial Library Opelika Alabama

The city spent $12 million to open the Opelika Public Library in 2021, the only public library in the city. The library features a 250-person auditorium, a pavilion, and study rooms. The Opelika Public Library replaces the previous Lewis Cooper Jr. Library which was built in 1976.

Opelika Community Theatre was founded in 2015.

== Parks and recreation ==
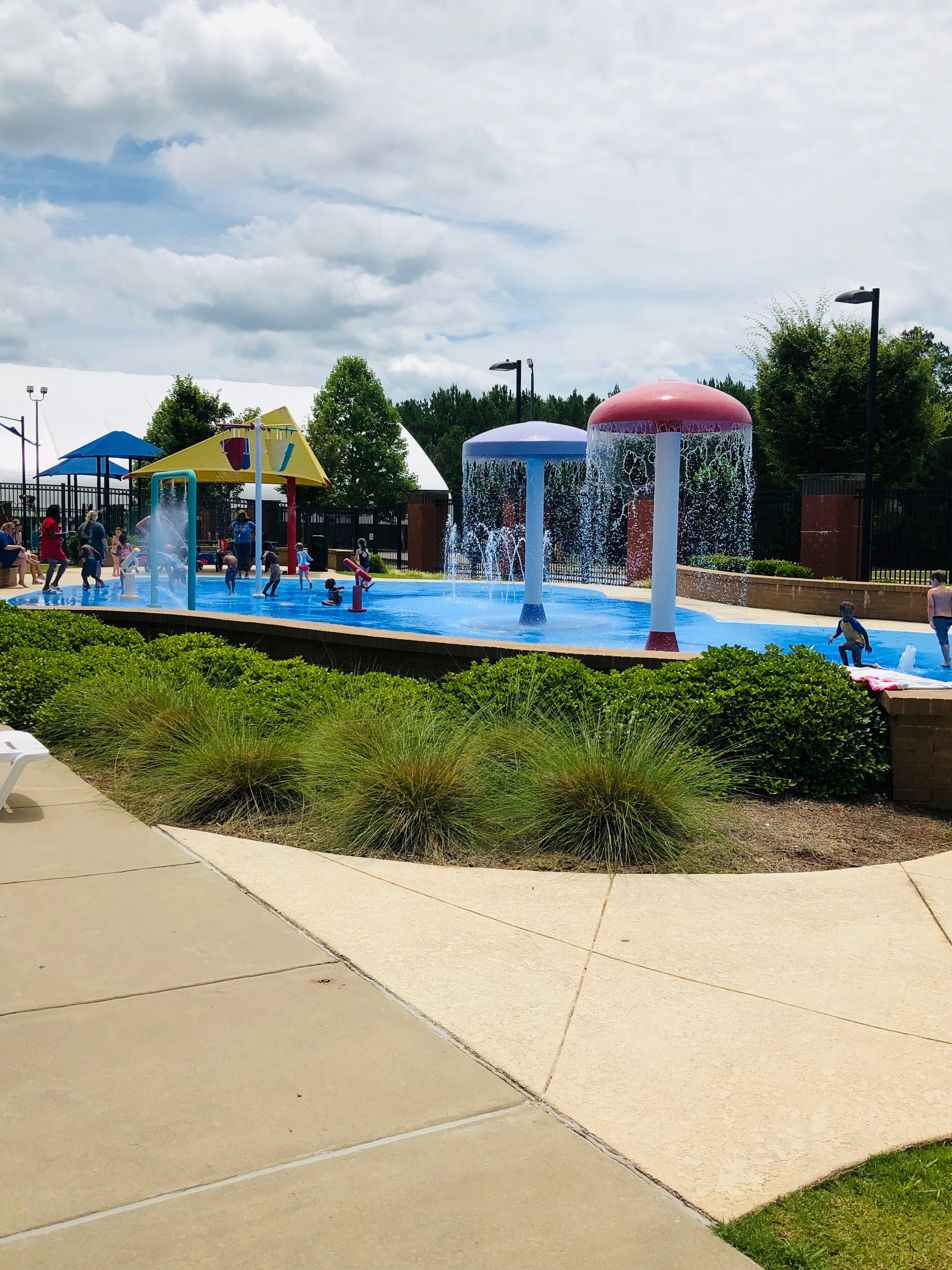
Opelika Sportsplex and Aquatics Center splashpark

Spring Villa Park, a 350-acre (140 ha) park in Opelika, features picnic and play areas, nature trails, two disc golf courses, and camping. Spring Villa, an antebellum house located in the park, is listed on the National Register of Historic Places.

In 2019, the city opened the Opelika Pickleball Facility, featuring 24 regulation courts.

In 2009, the City of Opelika built the Opelika SportsPlex and Aquatics Center, a $32 million facility.

The RTJ Golf Trail at Grand National, part of the Robert Trent Jones Golf Trail, is located in Opelika, and has hosted national championships.

== Government ==
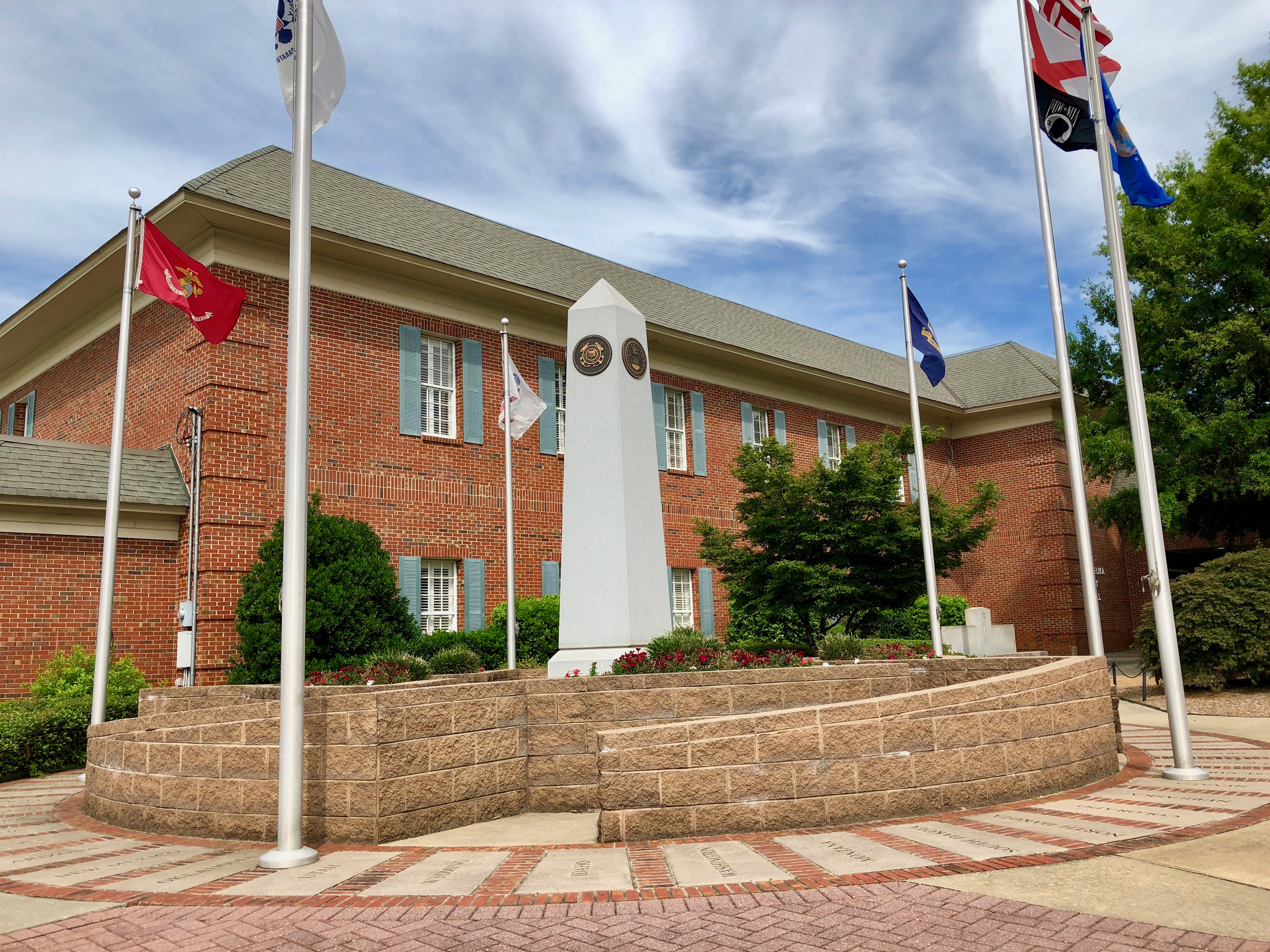
Memorial at Opelika City Hall

Opelika is governed by a mayor-council government, with a mayor and a five-member city council. The chief executive official of the city of Opelika is the mayor. The mayor is elected at-large for a four-year term. The mayor has complete executive power in the city, and can appoint and dismiss department heads at will.

In 2025, Eddie Smith was elected the mayor of Opelika.

In 2026, Mckenzie Lechlitner was elected mayor of Opelika after Eddie Smith resigned early.

In 2007, the city council designated Opelika as a City of Character, to recognize, emphasize and enforce 49 character traits throughout the community, and to mandate character training.

== Education ==
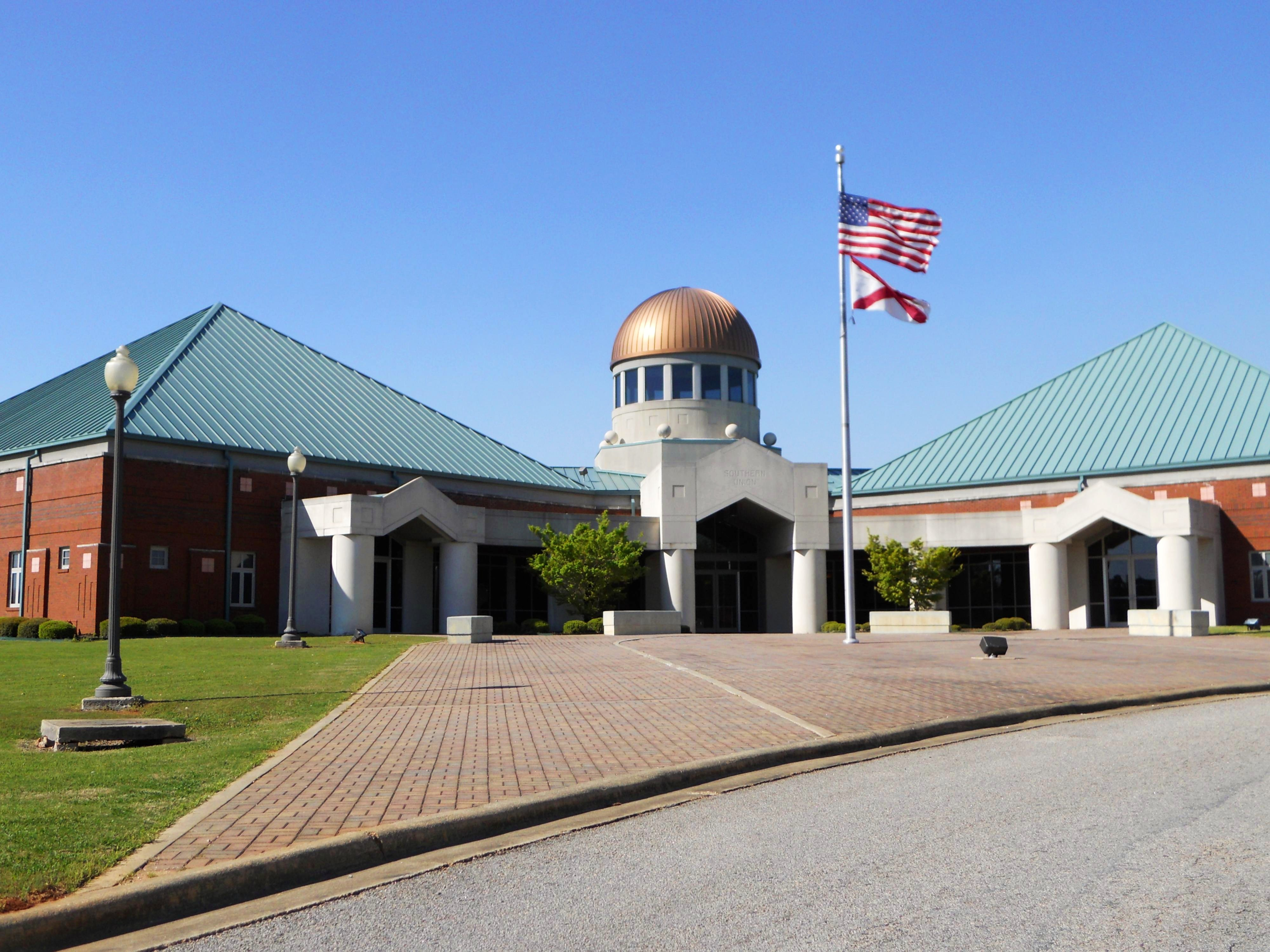
Opelika campus of Southern Union State Community College

Opelika City Schools is the public school system of Opelika. The Opelika City School System consists of nine schools. There are three primary schools serving grades Kindergarten – 2, three intermediate schools serving grades 3–5, one sixth grade school, one middle school (grades 7&8), and one high school, Opelika High School (grades 9–12).

A campus of Southern Union State Community College—a public, two-year college—is located Opelika.

== Media ==
Opelika is included in the Columbus, Georgia market according to Nielsen. The Opelika-Auburn News is a city newspaper.

The movie Norma Rae (1979) was filmed in Opelika.

== Infrastructure ==
=== Transportation ===
- U.S. Route 29
- U.S. Route 280
- U.S. Route 431
- Alabama State Route 14
- Alabama State Route 51
- Interstate 85

Lee-Russell Public Transit provides dial-a-ride transit service through Opelika and the region.

The last passenger train service was the Illinois Central Railroad's City of Miami (Chicago - Miami), having its final run in 1971. The Illinois Central's Seminole (Chicago - Jacksonville) served Opelika until 1969. Amtrak service is proposed under the American Jobs Plan.

== Notable people ==
- Brad Cotter, country music singer
- William L. Dickinson, former U.S. Congressman for the 2nd District of Alabama
- George Paul Harrison Jr., Confederate Army General and former U.S. Congressman for the 3rd District of Alabama
- Robert L. Howard, Army Special Forces officer
- George Lazenby Reynolds, the ninth bishop of the Episcopal Diocese of Tennessee.
- Dusty Slay, comedian.
- Mallory Hytes Hagan Stramara, Miss America 2013 and politician.
- Jabez Curry Street, physicist who discovered the atomic particles called muons.
- C. C. Torbert Jr., former Chief Justice of the Alabama Supreme Court.
- James S. Voss, retired United States Army colonel and NASA astronaut.
- Sharon Warren, actress.
