= Ebenezer Missionary Baptist Church (Auburn, Alabama) =

Historic church in Alabama, United States

- U.S. National Register of Historic Places
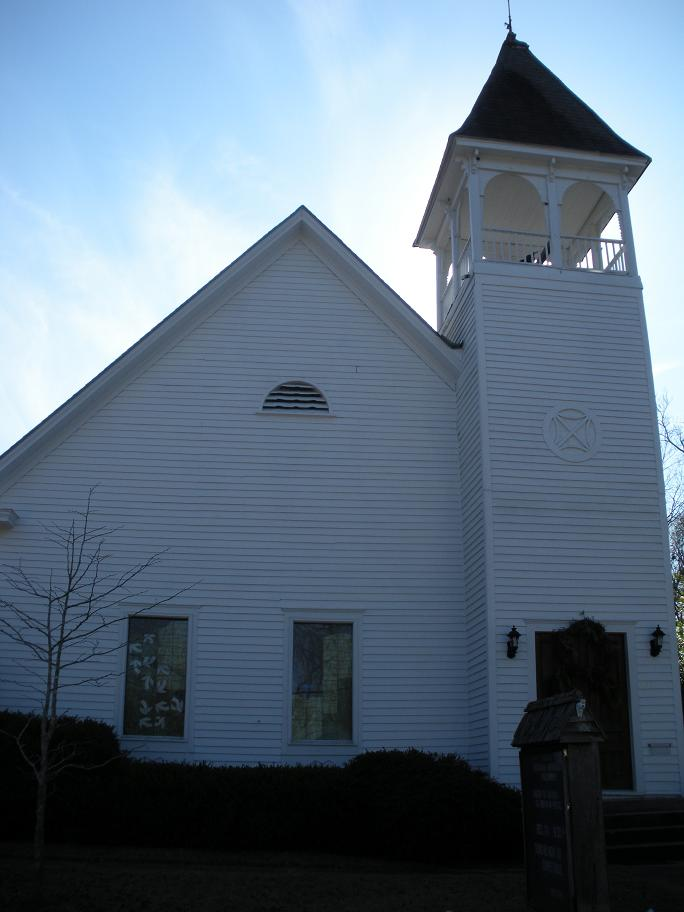
- Ebenezer Missionary Baptist Church, December 2008

- Location within Alabama Location within the United States
- Location: Thach St. and Auburn Dr. S, Auburn, Alabama
- Coordinates: 32°36′14″N 85°28′24″W
- Built: 1870
- NRHP reference No.: 75000317
- Added to NRHP: April 21, 1975

The Ebenezer Missionary Baptist Church is a church on the National Register of Historic Places in Auburn, Alabama. Ebenezer Baptist Church was the first African American church built in the Auburn area after the end of the Civil War in 1865. Over the next few years, the church members built the church out of hand-hewn logs, transported from miles away by mules. The church was completed around 1870 and served the Ebenezer congregation until 1969. The building was restored in 1970 by the Auburn Heritage Association, and currently houses the Auburn Unitarian Universalist Fellowship.

The Ebenezer Missionary Baptist Church was placed on the National Register of Historic Places on May 21, 1975.

== See also ==
- National Register of Historic Places listings in Lee County, Alabama
