= Durham Place, Chelsea =

Street in Chelsea, London

Coordinates: 51.48762°N 0.16121°W

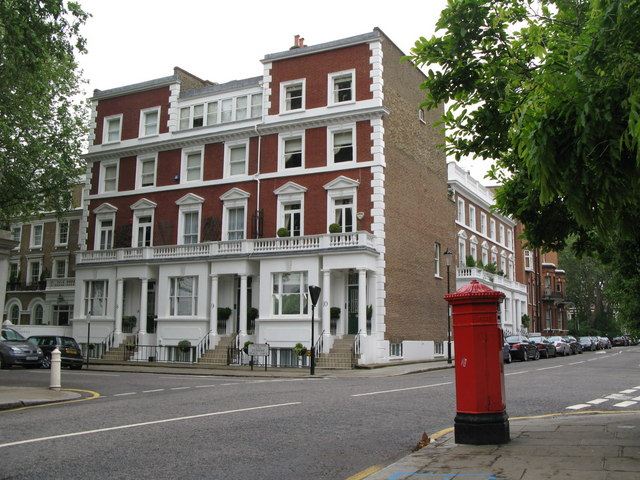
View of Durham Place from St Leonard's Terrace, 2008

Durham Place is a row of terraced houses in Chelsea in the Royal Borough of Kensington and Chelsea. It was built in 1790 by a Mr. Richardson who was the steward to the Lord of the Manor. It faces the open space of Burton's Court. Richardson lived at the adjoining house to the north of Durham Place, which he named the Manor House.

The author Bram Stoker moved to a small flat at 4 Durham Place in 1907.

The average value of a property in Durham Place was estimated at £6.1 million in 2020.

Two houses in the middle of Durham Place collapsed shortly before midnight on 2 November 2020. The houses were being redeveloped at the time. Emergency services were called at 23:35 GMT and local residents were evacuated and a cordon was put in place. Nobody was reported to be in the building and no casualties were reported according to London Fire Brigade and Metropolitan Police. The Health and Safety Executive are investigating the collapse of the buildings.
