= Old Rotation =

- U.S. National Register of Historic Places
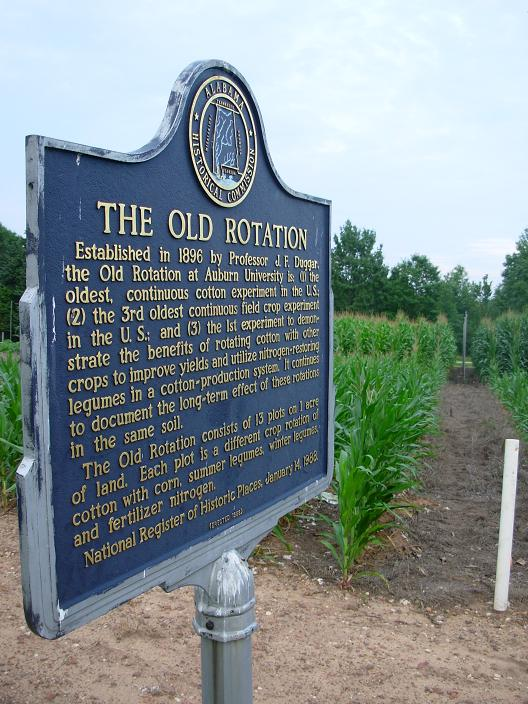
- The Old Rotation at Auburn University

- Location within Alabama Location within the United States
- Location: Auburn University, Auburn, Alabama
- Coordinates: 32°35′36″N 85°29′9″W
- Built: 1896
- NRHP reference No.: 87002390
- Added to NRHP: January 14, 1988

The Old Rotation is a soil fertility experiment on the Auburn University campus in Auburn, Alabama. It started in 1896, and is the third-oldest ongoing field crop experiment in the United States and the oldest continuous cotton experiment in the world. It was the first experiment to show that a cotton/legume crop rotation would allow soil to support a cotton crop indefinitely. The Old Rotation is listed on the National Register of Historic Places.

== History ==
For much of the latter part of the 19th century, cotton yields in the Southern United States suffered declines caused by planting the same crop on the same land year after year, a process which caused significant soil nutrient loss. In 1896, Professor J. F. Duggar of the Alabama Agricultural and Mechanical College set up the Old Rotation experiment on a one-acre (1,600 m²) plot of land one mile (1.6 km) south of the campus to test whether soil nutrient levels could be maintained by growing a crop of legumes on the same land as cotton, but in the winter months when cotton does not grow. This rotation of cotton and soybeans has continued uninterrupted since. In addition to the cotton/legume rotation, additional rotations have been added in adjacent plots consisting of a cotton/corn, cotton/corn/legume and cotton/corn/legume/soybean rotation. It became evident within a few years that adding the winter legume crop as a rotation was sufficient to restore adequate nutrients to the soil to maintain a yearly cotton crop indefinitely.

== Experiment ==
The Old Rotation consists of 13 plots of six planting systems:

- A control test where cotton is planted without rotation or fertilizer
- Cotton rotated with winter legumes but not fertilized
- Cotton just fertilized
- Cotton rotated with corn and winter legumes
- Cotton rotated with corn, winter legumes, and fertilizer
- Cotton rotated with corn, winter legumes, and soybeans

After 110 years of continuous plantings, cotton yields remain high for the rotated plots, producing nearly three times the yield of the unrotated plots.

== Miscellaneous ==
The Old Rotation is located adjacent to the Donald E. Davis Arboretum on Lem Morrison Drive in Auburn. The Rotation was placed on the National Register of Historic Places on February 14, 1988.

== Photo gallery ==
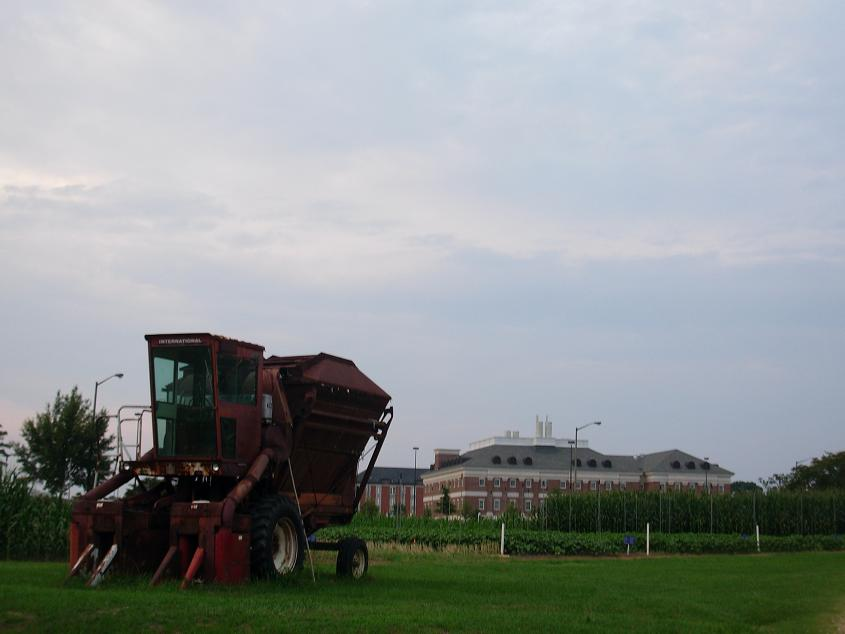

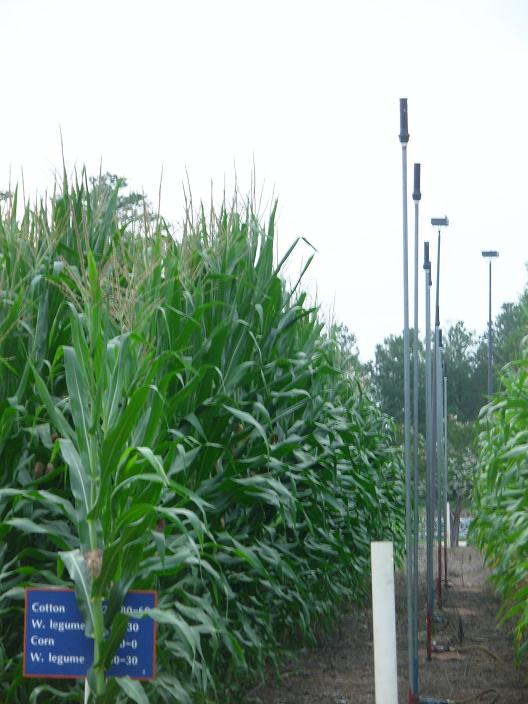

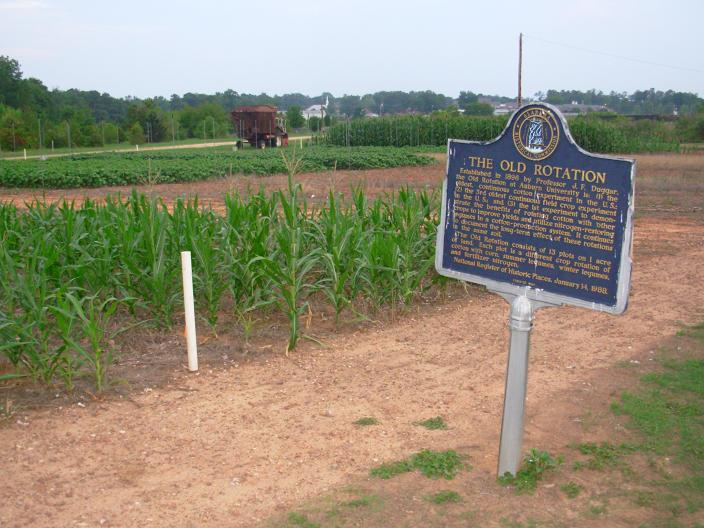

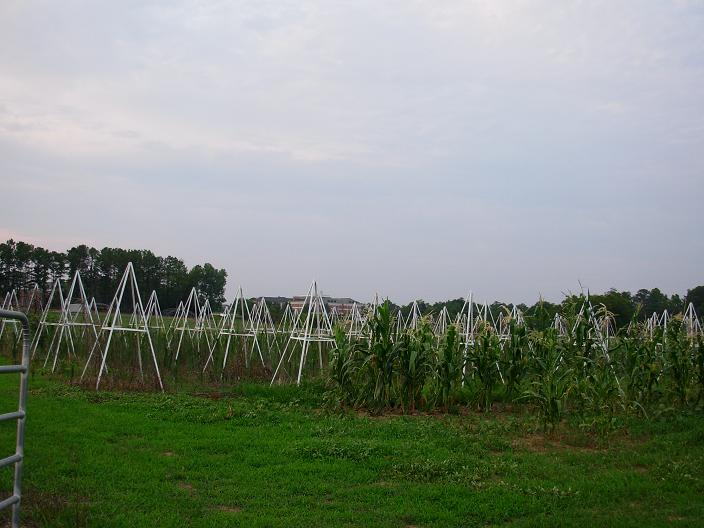

== See also ==
- Long-term experiment
- Cullars Rotation - a similar nearby agricultural rotation experiment
- National Register of Historic Places listings in Lee County, Alabama
