= Noble Hall =

Historic house in Alabama, United States

- U.S. National Register of Historic Places
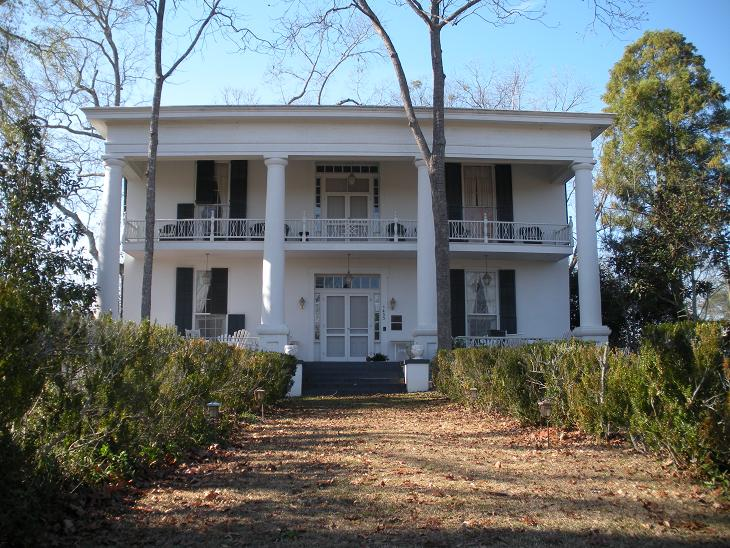
- Noble Hall in December 2008

- Location within Alabama Location within the United States
- Nearest city: Auburn, Alabama
- Coordinates: 32°38′23″N 85°27′55″W
- Built: 1854
- Architect: Henry Foster
- Architectural style: Greek Revival
- NRHP reference No.: 72000163
- Added to NRHP: March 24, 1972

Noble Hall, also known as the Frazer-Brown-Pearson Home, is a historic Greek Revival style plantation house in Auburn, Alabama. It was listed on the National Register of Historic Places on March 24, 1972.

== History ==
Noble Hall was built in 1854 as the main residence of a 2,000 acre (8 km^{2}) cotton plantation. The house was constructed utilizing rock masonry, with eight rooms featuring 12 foot (3.7 m) ceilings and 18 inch (46 cm) thick exterior walls. The front and rear both feature full-width cantilevered balconies and four monumental Doric columns, for a total of eight. Built behind the home were the exterior kitchen, carriage and smokehouse, and overseer's house. As with most of the larger plantation houses in the antebellum South, Noble Hall was built with slave labor, though the owner brought in a contractor from Kentucky to manage the construction.

During the American Civil War, the home housed a number of sick and injured Confederate soldiers. Toward the end of the war, Union troops came to ransack the mansion, but were persuaded to take only the horses and mules when one of the residents showed a Masonic sign.

The home remained in the hands of the original owners, the Frazer family, until cotton prices collapsed in 1922. In 1932, Noble Hall was purchased by J.V. Brown, who restored the home and grounds to their original condition. In 1941, Brown sold the house and surrounding lands to Alabama Polytechnic Institute president Luther Noble Duncan. His daughter inherited the home in 1951, and named it Noble Hall, after her father. Noble Hall was placed on the National Register of Historic Places in 1972, making it the first structure in Lee County to be listed.

== See also ==
- National Register of Historic Places listings in Lee County, Alabama
