= Thomas Brewster (translator) =

English doctor and translator

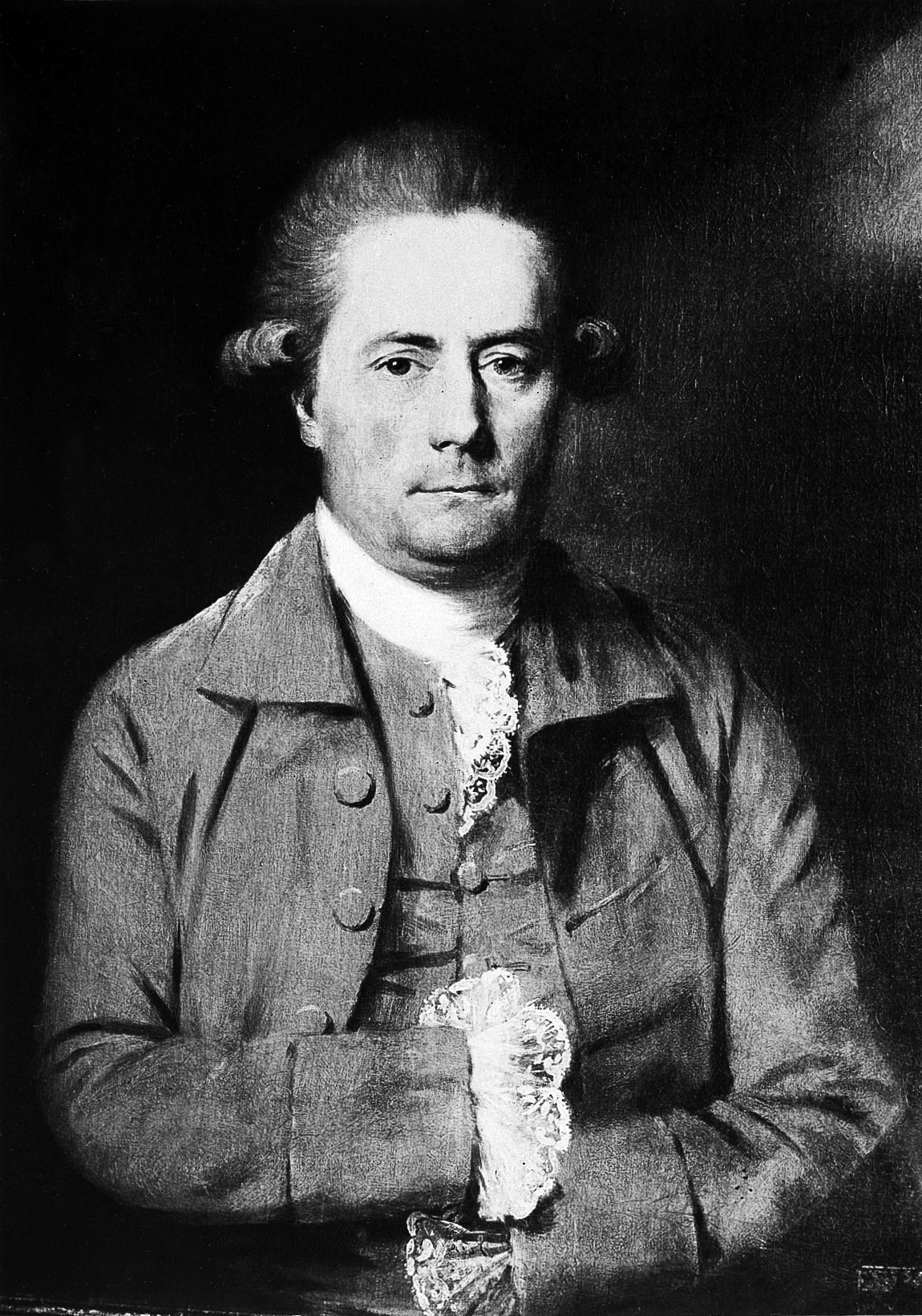
Thomas Brewster

Thomas Brewster (18 September 1705 – 1764) was an English doctor and translator.

== Life ==
Brewster was the son of Benjamin Brewster of Eardisland, Herefordshire, and was born on 18 September 1705. He was educated at Merchant Taylors' School, and thence elected to St John's College, Oxford, in 1724. He graduated B.A. in 1727, M.A. in 1732, B.M. and D.M. in 1738. He was also elected a fellow of his college. While at Oxford he published a translation of the Second Satire of Persius, in English verse by itself, to see, as he says in the preface, how the public would appreciate his work. This was in 1733. The third and fourth Satires were published together in 1742, the fifth in the same year, and the six satires in one volume posthumously in 1784. Brewster, after leaving the university, practised medicine at Bath until his death in 1764.

He was the inspiration for the character "Doctor Brewster" in Tom Jones (book 18, chapter 4).
