= Pebble Hill =

Historic house in Alabama, United States

- Scott-Yarbrough House
- U.S. National Register of Historic Places
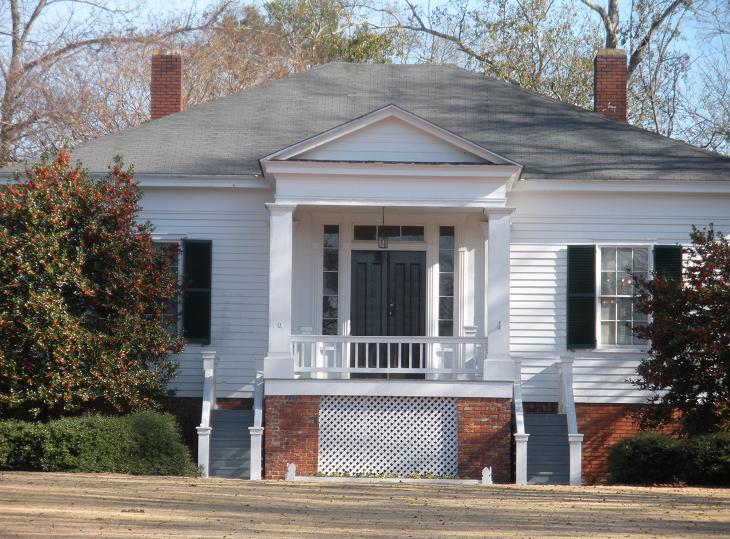
- The house in 2008

- Location within Alabama Location within the United States
- Location: 101 DeBardeleben St., Auburn, Alabama
- Coordinates: 32°36′23″N 85°28′21″W
- Built: 1847
- Architectural style: Greek Revival
- NRHP reference No.: 75000318
- Added to NRHP: April 16, 1975

Pebble Hill, also known as the Scott-Yarbrough House, is an antebellum cottage in Auburn, Alabama listed on the National Register of Historic Places. The property has undergone multiple ownerships over the decades. Pebble Hill currently serves as the location of the Caroline Marshall Draughon Center for the Arts & Humanities in the College of Liberal Arts at Auburn University.

== History ==
=== Treaty of Cusseta (1832) ===
Pebble Hill's location used to reside in the Creek Tribe's territory. The Creeks signed the Treaty of Cusseta, or the Treaty of Washington, on March 24, 1832. This treaty entailed the Creeks giving up a portion of their land in Alabama in exchange for allotments–320 acres for families and 640 acres for chiefs. Despite the treaty's promises of maintaining the Creek's land ownership, multiple loopholes allowed fraud and violence against the Creeks. The Creek Nation struggled to possess their land, and in 1836, the United States suspended the Treaty of Cusseta due to ongoing violence. The land where Pebble Hill stands used to belong to Nelocco Harjo, a Creek native. Later, Creek Tribe translator Paddy Carr would receive the allotment.

=== The Scotts and the Civil War (1846-1865) ===
In the 1830s, Colonel Nathaniel J. Scott and Mary K. Scott migrated to east Alabama with a group of settlers. The Scotts are credited with helping Auburn, Alabama develop at the beginning of its growth period. Nathaniel Scott was even Auburn's town commissioner in 1839. Around 1846, about 100 acres–the land where Pebble Hill stands–sold for $800. Scott built Pebble Hill in 1847 at the center of a 100-acre (0.40 km^{2}) plantation. The structure was built in the Greek Revival style with hand-hewn heart of pine floors and joists and rafters held together by wooden pegs.

Most of Pebble Hill's upkeep and maintenance resulted from enslaved African Americans. The Scotts had an estimated 40-60 slaves before the end of the Civil War. After the Civil War, the emancipated African Americans resided south of Pebble Hill.

During the Civil War, Wilson's Raiders looted the home. The raiders were unsuccessful in finding many valuables due to the items buried near a spring on the property. At the end of the Civil War, Mary K. Scott sold Pebble Hill.

=== Mary Virginia Riley (1876-1907) ===
Absentee owners managed Pebble Hill until Mary Virginia Riley purchased the land in 1876. She was a widow when she acquired Pebble Hill, and there were very few records of how she used the land. Riley lived at Pebble Hill until her death in 1907.

=== The Yarbrough Family (1912-1974) ===
In 1912, the home was purchased by Cecil S. Yarbrough, a state representative and three-time mayor of Auburn. Bertha Mae Yarbrough, his wife, was born and raised in Auburn, AL. Bertha Mae was also a recent graduate of the Alabama Polytechnic Institute (Auburn University). The couple had a total of five children. Pebble Hill would remain within the Yarbrough family until Clarke S. Yarbrough, one of the children, sold the property in 1974.

Throughout the 70 years of ownership, the Yarbrough family rented parts of the house to students. The size of the property would decrease over time. Pebble Hill comprised 95 acres at the beginning of the family's ownership. As Auburn grew in population, parts of Pebble Hill's land would be sold for commercial development. When the land was sold in 1974, apartments and housing surrounded Pebble Hill.

=== Renovations ===
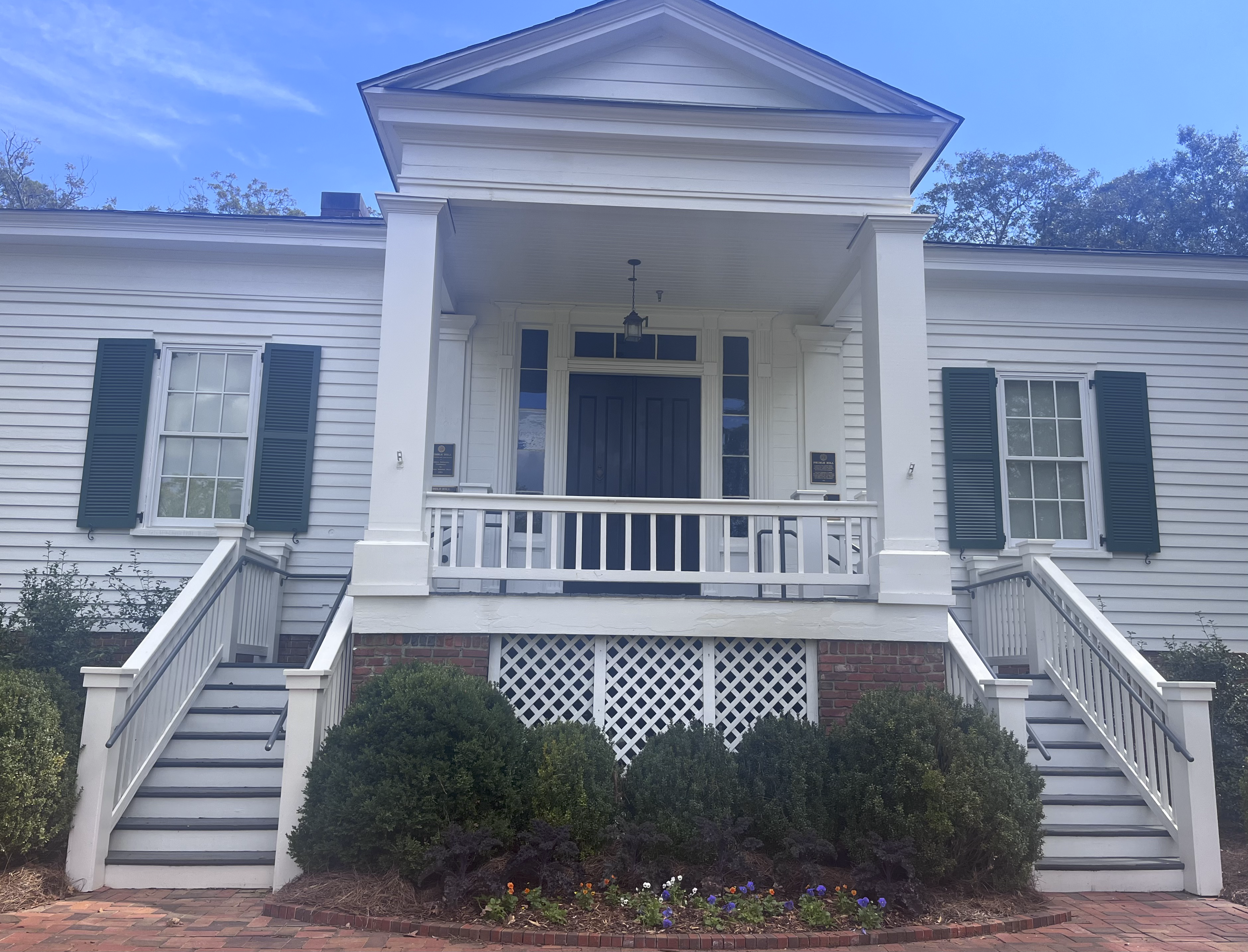
Front Exterior of Pebble Hill House

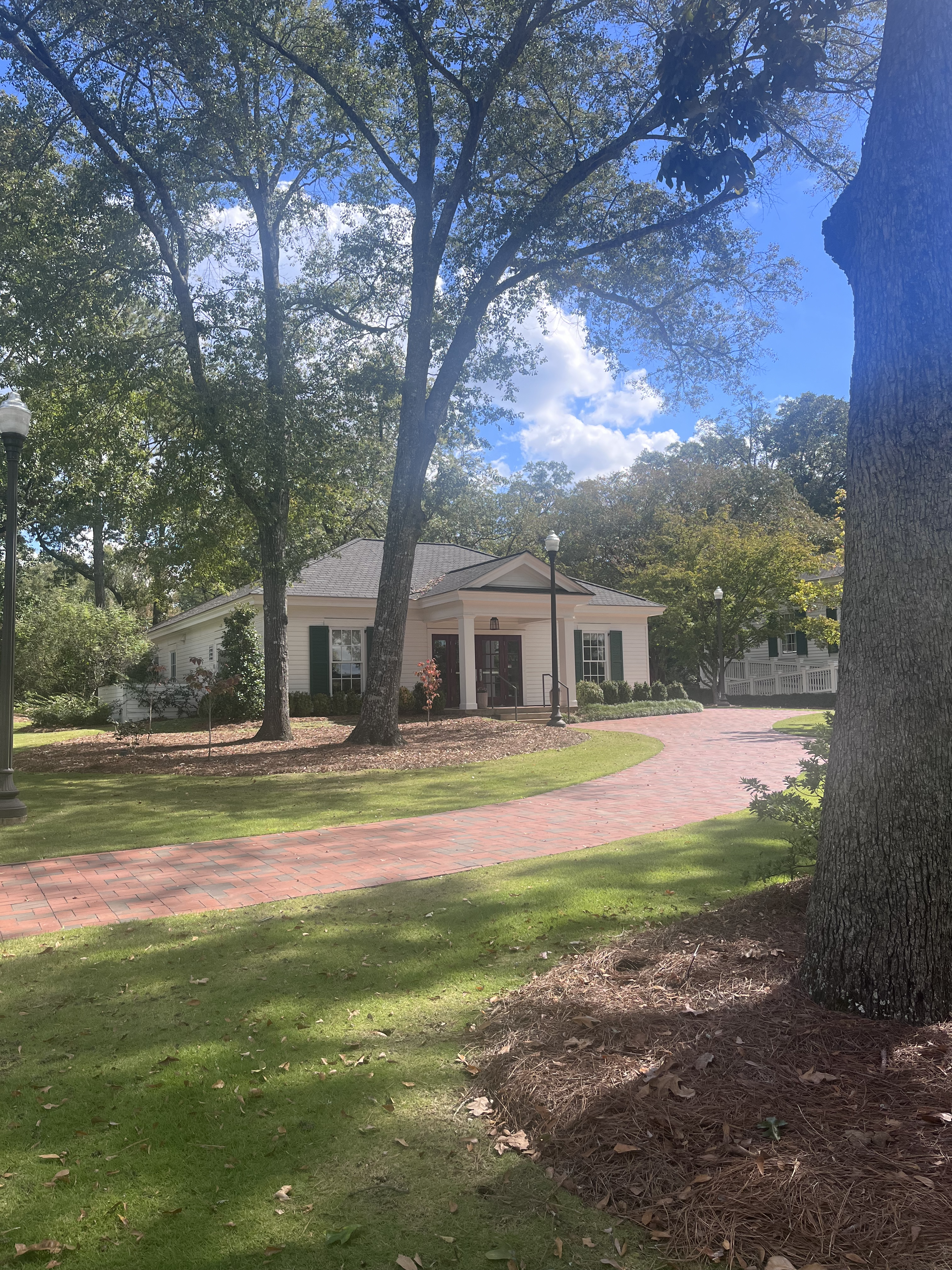
Pebble Hill Additional Building

The Auburn Heritage Association purchased Pebble Hill from the Yarbrough family for restoration in 1974. The property was placed on the National Register of Historic Places on May 16, 1975. After the restoration period, Pebble Hill was donated to Auburn University in 1985. In the mid-2010s, Pebble Hill would undergo more renovations because of a philanthropic donation. As a result of recent renovations, Pebble Hill now has an additional house on the property that neighbors the main settlement; the building is used for assembly events. The main house's interior contains multiple 19th and 20th-century artifacts, ranging from portraits and art to old Alabama maps.

== Present-Day ==
Auburn University's College of Liberal Arts recognizes the structure of Pebble Hill as the Caroline Marshall Draughon Center for the Arts & Humanities. The location hosts tours and programs covering art, history, and literature.

== See also ==
- National Register of Historic Places listings in Lee County, Alabama
