= Ambrose Burton House =

Historic house in Kentucky, United States

- U.S. National Register of Historic Places
- Location within Kentucky Location within the United States
- Location: Unity Rd., near Harrodsburg, Kentucky
- Coordinates: 37°51′09″N 84°50′18″W
- Area: 0.8 acres (0.32 ha)
- NRHP reference No.: 83002826
- Added to NRHP: August 11, 1983

The Ambrose Burton House, located on Unity Rd. near Harrodsburg, Kentucky, was listed on the National Register of Historic Places in 1983.

It is believed to have been built by Ambrose Burton in 1798. The house is a two-story log building with a single room on each floor. It is 18 by 24 feet (5.5 m × 7.3 m) in plan.
