= City of Character =

A City of character, or Character City is a city that complies with the principles described by the International Association of Character Cities (IACC). The group encourages governments, government leaders, civic organizations and religious organizations to band together to establish a "city" or "community" of character. This involves passing ordinances, recognizing those who practice good character. The IACC provides media and resources for those who wish to establish a character city as well as template websites, legislation and documentation.

The group declares that it has over 171 declared "character cities" in the United States and 48 known internationally.

== International Association of Character Cities ==
The International Association of Character Cities (IACC) was established in 1998 as a division of the Character Training Institute, a 501(c)(3) non-profit, tax-exempt organization based in Oklahoma City, OK. IACC was developed to facilitate city-wide efforts in advocating personal character development . Funding for the program is primarily generated from the sale of materials and training.

== Program ==
The City of Character program encourages cities to each month emphasize and focus on one of 49 character qualities, developed originally Tom Hill as an adaptation of character traits identified by Bill Gothard. The program was further developed by and is now administered by the Character Training Institute. Some of the qualities taught include: Attentiveness, Dependability, Forgiveness, Gratefulness, Orderliness, Truthfulness, and Obedience. A full list of these character qualities can be found on the Character First! Web site.

The IACC and Character First! organizations produce character-based materials for various groups, including: Family, Business, Education (Elementary and High School), and Community. Character First! is not a religious program, but the materials can also be adapted for use in a religious setting. According to Character Training Institute and IACC advocate, Dr. Joseph Ahne, the program does use religious symbols and is "biblically based". Dr. Anhe states that “We use [ Character First! ], because we can’t take religion into schools and government. But it’s all based on the same thing.” Implementation of the program varies from symbolic to more devoted adherence, but based upon its adoption of the program, one city Tagaytay, Philippines, even requires completion of the Character First! program in order to receive a marriage license.

The cost of the program varies based on the materials purchased and training conferences utilized in the implementation. Reports indicate the materials are between $1,200 per annum or as much as $8,305.

== Criticism ==
Critics argue that the movement is a thinly veiled attempt to reduce the separation of church and state and an attempt to require conformity and obedience in society. Additionally, critics eye the foundation and funding of the program by various evangelical leaders including those in the Dominionist movement. Finally, the character traits emphasized by the program are criticized for overemphasizing orderliness and obedience which critics find especially troubling when mixed with a political agenda with "template" legislation, some of which emphasizes enabling schools to purchase IACC character training materials. The program is described by some to be "purely motivational" and thus difficult to measure in its "intangible benefits".

== Mike Huckabee ==
The program has come into the public eye because of former Governor Mike Huckabee's warm regards about character cities in general during his unsuccessful attempt in 2008 to gain the Republican presidential nomination. The IACC uses Huckabee's name in its "How to build a Character City" guide. The IACC has been accused by Huckabee's aides and Arkansas officials, as far back as 1997, of overstating Huckabee's enthusiasm or involvement in the program.

== Sarah Palin ==
Sarah Palin, the former governor of Alaska, also promoted cities of character in Alaska, while running for Vice President of the United States in the 2008 U.S. elections. During her second term as mayor and after attending an April 2000 training seminar at Bill Gothard's Institute in Basic Life Principles, Palin obtained the designation of "City of Character" for her hometown of Wasilla, Alaska.
