= Jule Collins Smith Museum of Fine Art =

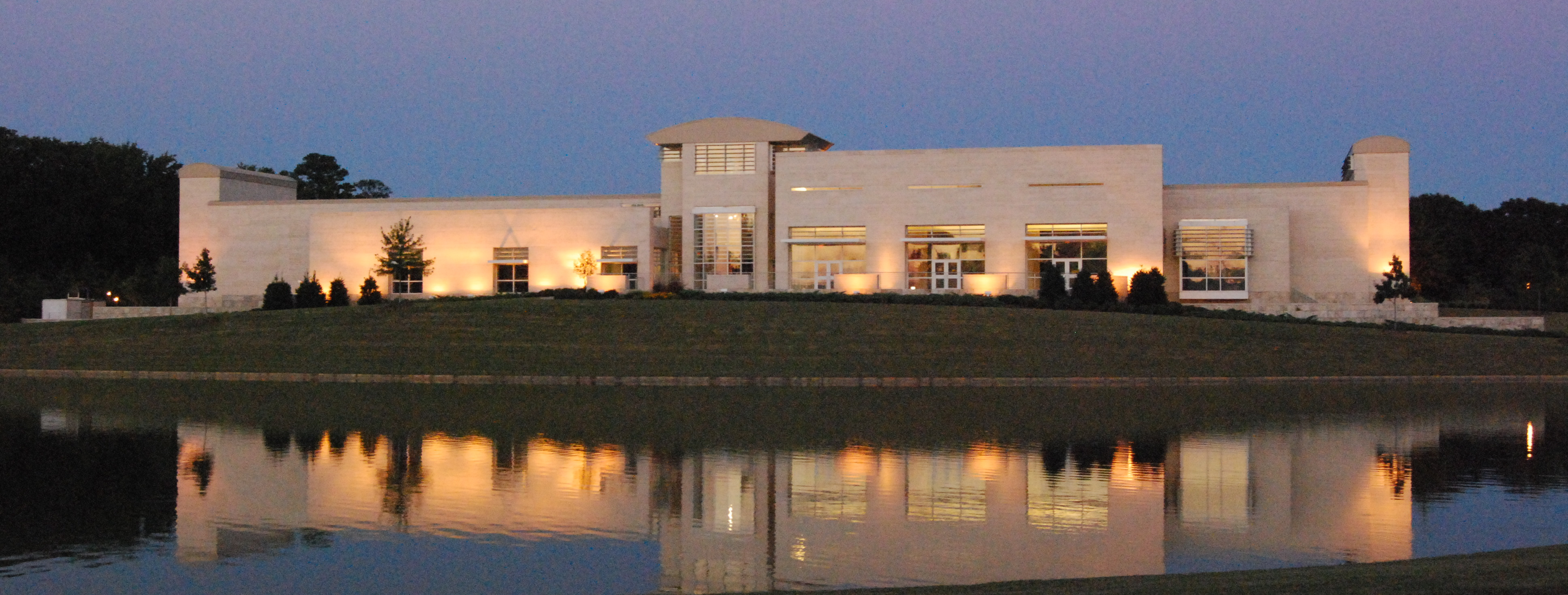
- Established: 2003
- Location: Auburn University; 901 South College Street; Auburn, Alabama
- Coordinates: 32.587914475925054°N 85.48374837116447°W
- Type: Art museum
- Director: Cindi Malinick
- Website: jcsm.auburn.edu

The Jule Museum at Auburn University is an accredited art museum on the campus of Auburn University in Auburn, Alabama. The museum is named after Jule Collins Smith, the wife of Albert Smith, who graduated from Auburn University in 1947. Smith donated funds to Auburn University in support of the construction of an art museum as a gift to his wife, in honor of their 50th wedding anniversary. The museum is both an academic museum and open to all visitors with free admission. In spring of 2013, the American Alliance of Museums (AAM) recognized the museum as an accredited museum. In 2022, the AAM awarded the museum re-accreditation.

The museum participates in the North American Reciprocal Museums program, the Southeastern Reciprocal Membership program, and the Museum Travel Alliance. The museum holds memberships in the American Alliance of Museums, the Southeastern Museums Conference, the Association of Art Museum Directors.

== Permanent collection ==
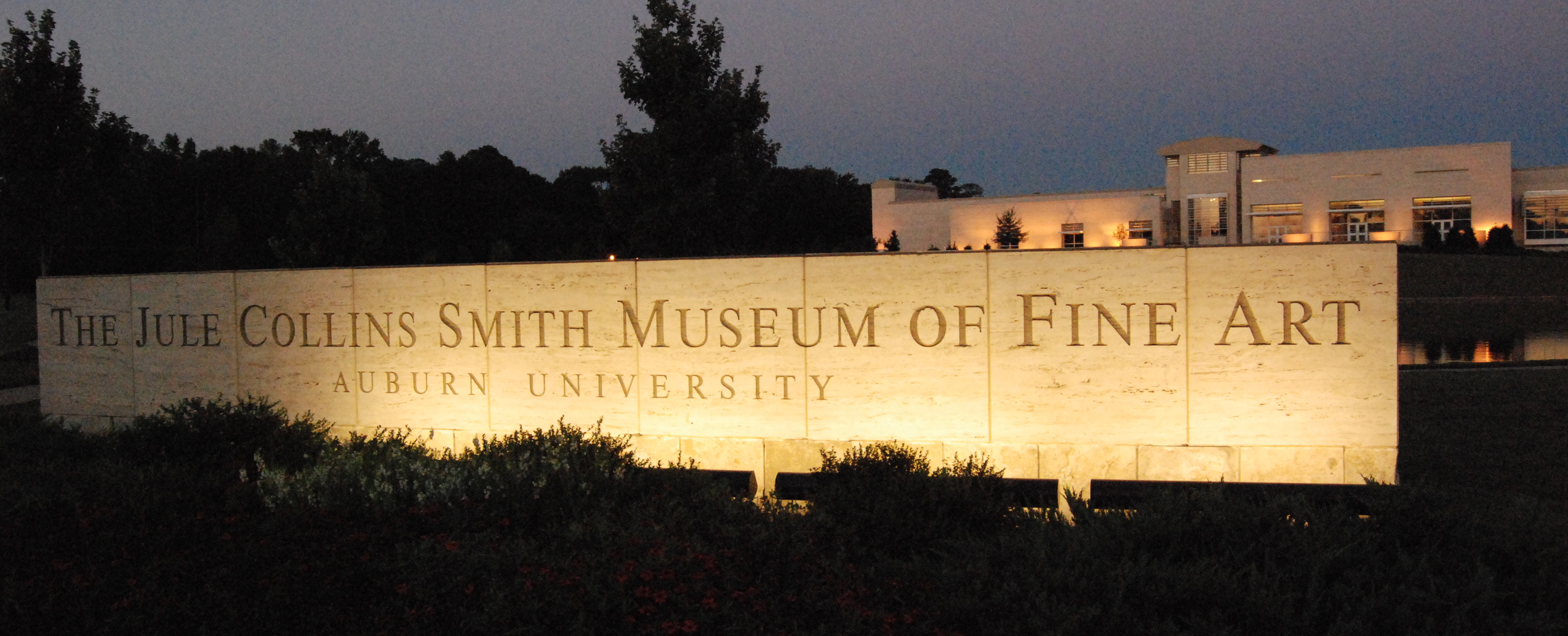
The Jule Collins Smith Museum of Fine Art, seen at night from the north

The museum's permanent collection focuses mainly on 19th and 20th century American and European Art. The museum includes works by Romare Bearden, Ralston Crawford, Arthur Dove, Georgia O'Keeffe, Yasuo Kuniyoshi, Jacob Lawrence, John Marin, and Ben Shahn within its Advancing American Art collection. Within the museum's Louise Hauss and David Brent Miller Audubon Collection are prints by naturalist John James Audubon. In addition, the museum contains the Bill L. Harbert Collection of European Art, which features works by Marc Chagall, Salvador Dalí, Henri Matisse, Joan Miró, Pablo Picasso, and Pierre-Auguste Renoir.
