= Spring Villa =

Historic house in Alabama, United States

- U.S. National Register of Historic Places
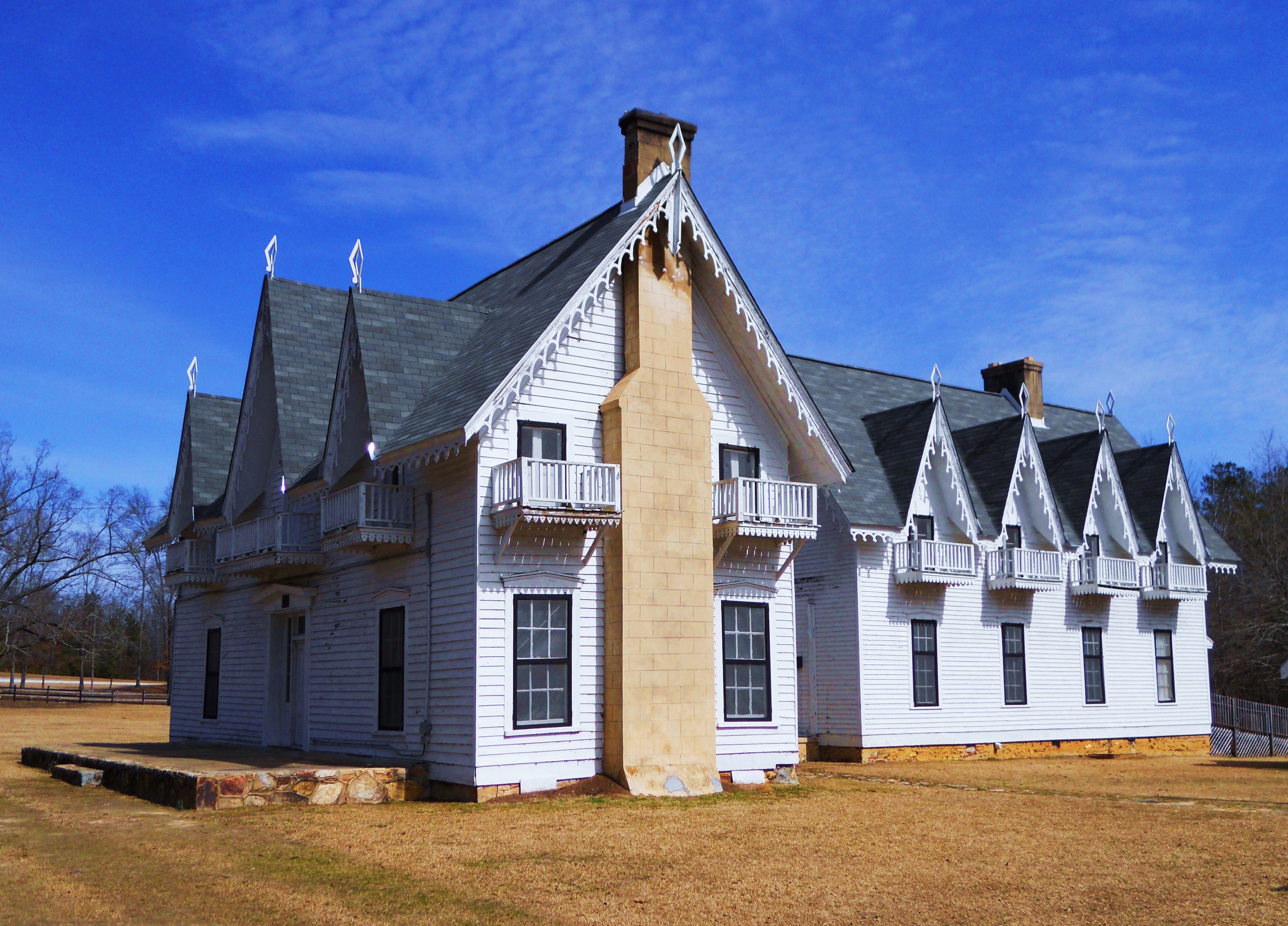
- Spring Villa in 2010

- Location within Alabama Location within the United States
- Nearest city: Opelika, Alabama
- Coordinates: 32°35′16″N 85°18′42″W
- Built: 1850
- Architect: King, Horace
- Architectural style: Gothic Revival
- NRHP reference No.: 78000494
- Added to NRHP: January 3, 1978

Spring Villa is a historic Carpenter Gothic plantation house on the outskirts of Opelika, Alabama. Inspired by designs published by Andrew Jackson Downing, the house is one of only about twenty remaining residential examples of Gothic Revival architecture remaining in the state. It was built by Horace King in 1850 next to a 30-acre (12 ha) spring-fed lake, from which it takes its name.

The house was acquired by the city of Opelika in 1927 and now forms the nucleus of its 325-acre (132 ha) Spring Villa Park. It was added to the National Register of Historic Places on January 3, 1978, due to its architectural significance.

== Architecture ==
The 1 1/2-story wood-frame building has a front elevation with three bays. The ridge-line of the roof is parallel to the front façade. Each side of the main structure is gabled and flanked by stuccoed chimneys. The upper story makes extensive use of steeply pitched cross-gables. Each window on the upper floor is fronted by an individual sawnwork balcony. These originally incorporated latticework rather than the current simple balusters. Each gable is trimmed with bargeboards and crowned with a diamond-shaped pinnacle.

The semi-detached, centrally placed rear ell, also one-and-a-half stories, has a four-bay façade on each long side and replicates features seen on the main façade. It was added to the building in 1934 by the Civil Works Administration, during conversion of the house into a clubhouse for the city.
