= Eardisland =

Village in Herefordshire, England

Coordinates: 52.222°N 2.852°W

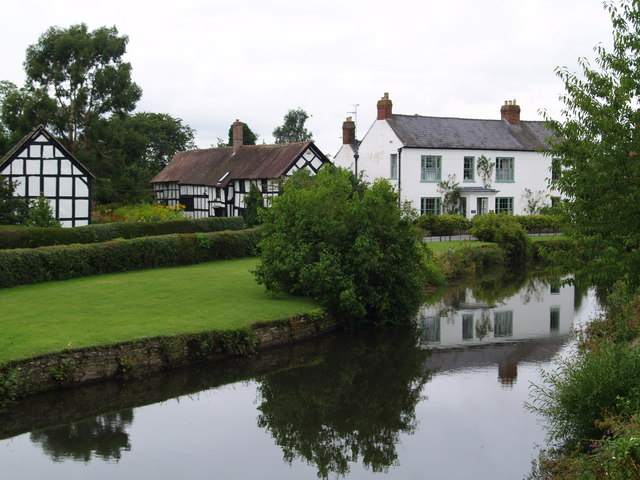

- Location within Herefordshire
- Population: 502 (2001 census)
- OS grid reference: SO4158
- Civil parish: Eardisland
- Unitary authority: County of Herefordshire
- Ceremonial county: Herefordshire
- Region: West Midlands
- Country: England
- Sovereign state: United Kingdom
- Post town: Leominster
- Postcode district: HR6
- Dialling code: 01544
- Police: West Mercia
- Fire: Hereford and Worcester
- Ambulance: West Midlands
- UK Parliament: North Herefordshire
- Website: Eardisland Parish Council Website

Eardisland (/ˈɜːrdzlənd/ URDZ-lənd) is a village and civil parish on the River Arrow, about 5 miles (8 km) west of the market town of Leominster, Herefordshire. The civil parish includes the hamlets of Upper Hardwick, Lower Hardwick and Lower Burton.

Eardisland is part of The Black and White Village Trail, which explores the villages of half-timbered, black and white houses to be found in this area of northern Herefordshire. The parish has rolling arable and pastoral farmland and ancient apple and cider apple orchards.

The A44 Oxford to Aberystwyth road bypasses the south of Eardisland. (It formerly ran through the village centre, crossing the River Arrow there.) To the east the A4110 runs north/south, a little to the east of the course of the Watling Street Roman road which here, marks the eastern boundary of the parish.

The Church of England parish church of St. Mary the Virgin has an early 13th-century nave, two early 14th-century tomb recesses and a 14th-century porch. The architect Henry Curzon substantially renewed the building in 1864.

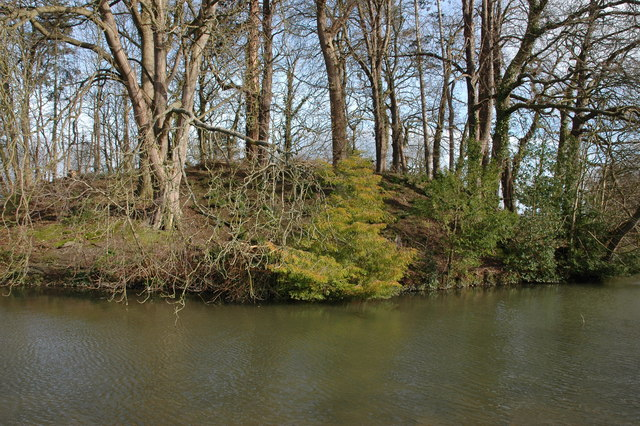
Eardisland motte

Just north of the church is the overgrown motte of Eardisland Castle, surrounded by a moat.

Eardisland has a 17th-century dovecote, two public houses, tea rooms and a restored AA box which is the oldest in England. On 1 May 2010, a community shop was opened on the ground floor of the dovecote, staffed and run by volunteers.

Burton Court, about 1 mile (1.6 km) south of Eardisland, includes an early 14th-century hall. Much of the remainder of the house was added in the 18th century. The architect Clough Williams-Ellis added the Tudor Revival front in 1912.

== Twinning ==
Country	Village	Region	Year
France	La Vieille-Lyre	Normandy	2007

== Sources ==
- Pevsner, Nikolaus (1963). Herefordshire. The Buildings of England. Harmondsworth: Penguin Books. pp. 119, 120.
