= Robert Wilton Burton House =

- U.S. National Register of Historic Places
- Alabama Register of Landmarks and Heritage
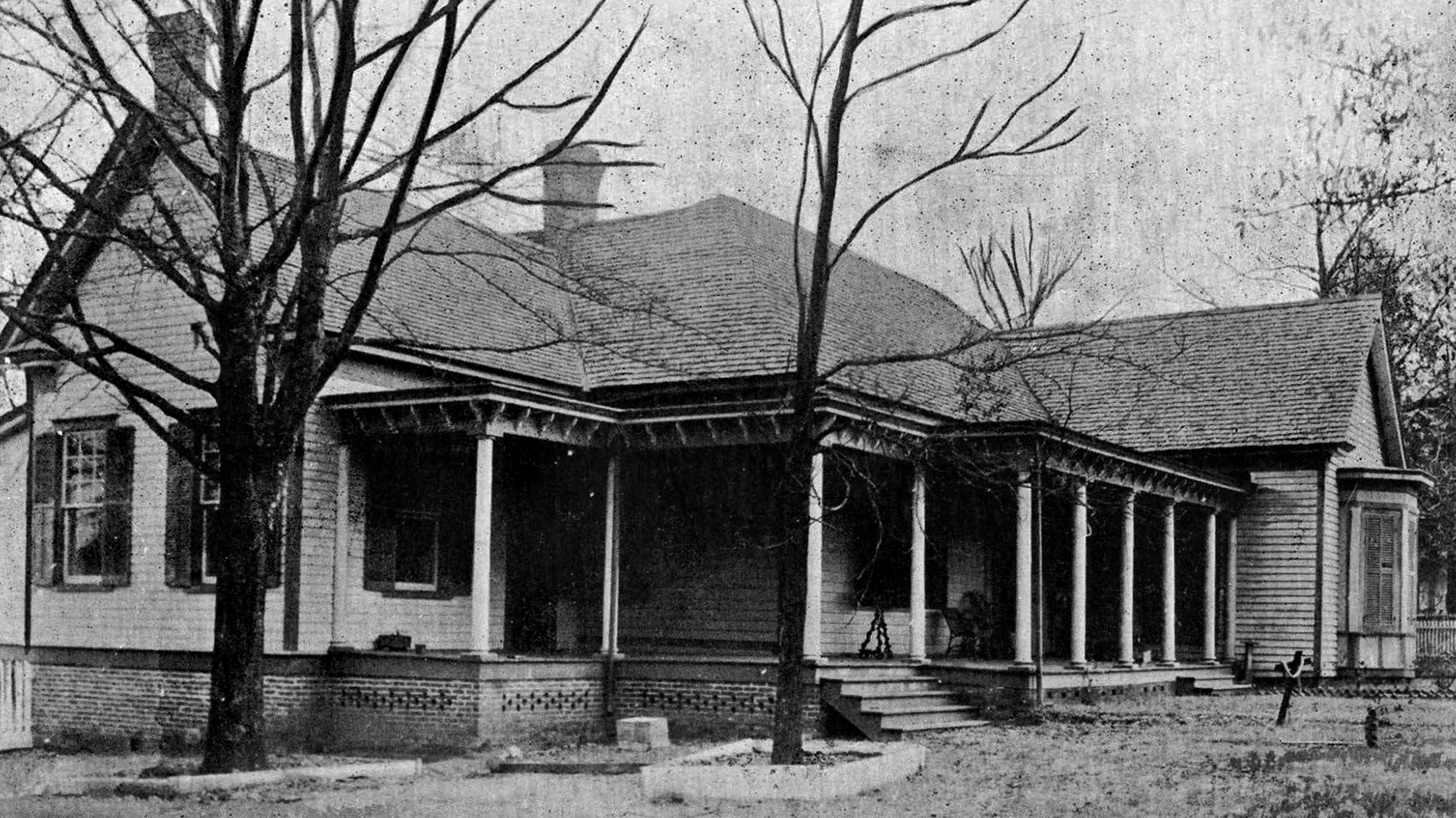
- The Robert Wilton Burton House in Auburn, Alabama prior to its demolition in 1993.
- Location: 315 E. Magnolia St., Auburn, Alabama
- Coordinates: 32°36′24″N 85°28′39″W
- Area: less than one acre
- Built: 1885
- Architectural style: Queen Anne
- NRHP reference No.: 80000701

Significant dates
- Added to NRHP: May 8, 1980
- Designated ARLH: January 29, 1980

The Robert Wilton Burton House, at 315 E. Magnolia St. in Auburn, Alabama, was built in 1885 in Queen Anne style. It was listed on the National Register of Historic Places in 1980.

It was deemed "significant for its associations with Robert Wilton Burton (1848-1917), a locally noted poet. Additionally, it is a good example of late 19th century vernacular cottages."

Robert Wilton Burton, "a native of Camden County, Georgia, was one of Auburn's most prominent and beloved citizens. From 1880 to 1885, he published four poems - "Fleetwood", "The Bell Ringer of Brinsely", "Q.K." and "The Master of Parton Place". With the money gained from these poems, Burton built this house which he affectionately called "The Four Story Cottage". It remained his home until his death in 1917. In addition to his literary efforts, Burton served the city of Auburn in a variety of positions. At the request of the Board of Trustees of Alabama Polytechnic Institute (now Auburn University), he opened a bookstore to serve the students of the city. In addition to operating the bookstore, he served as clerk of the Town Council (1892-1917) and as secretary for the API Board of Trustees (1899-1917), twice refusing appointment to the board."

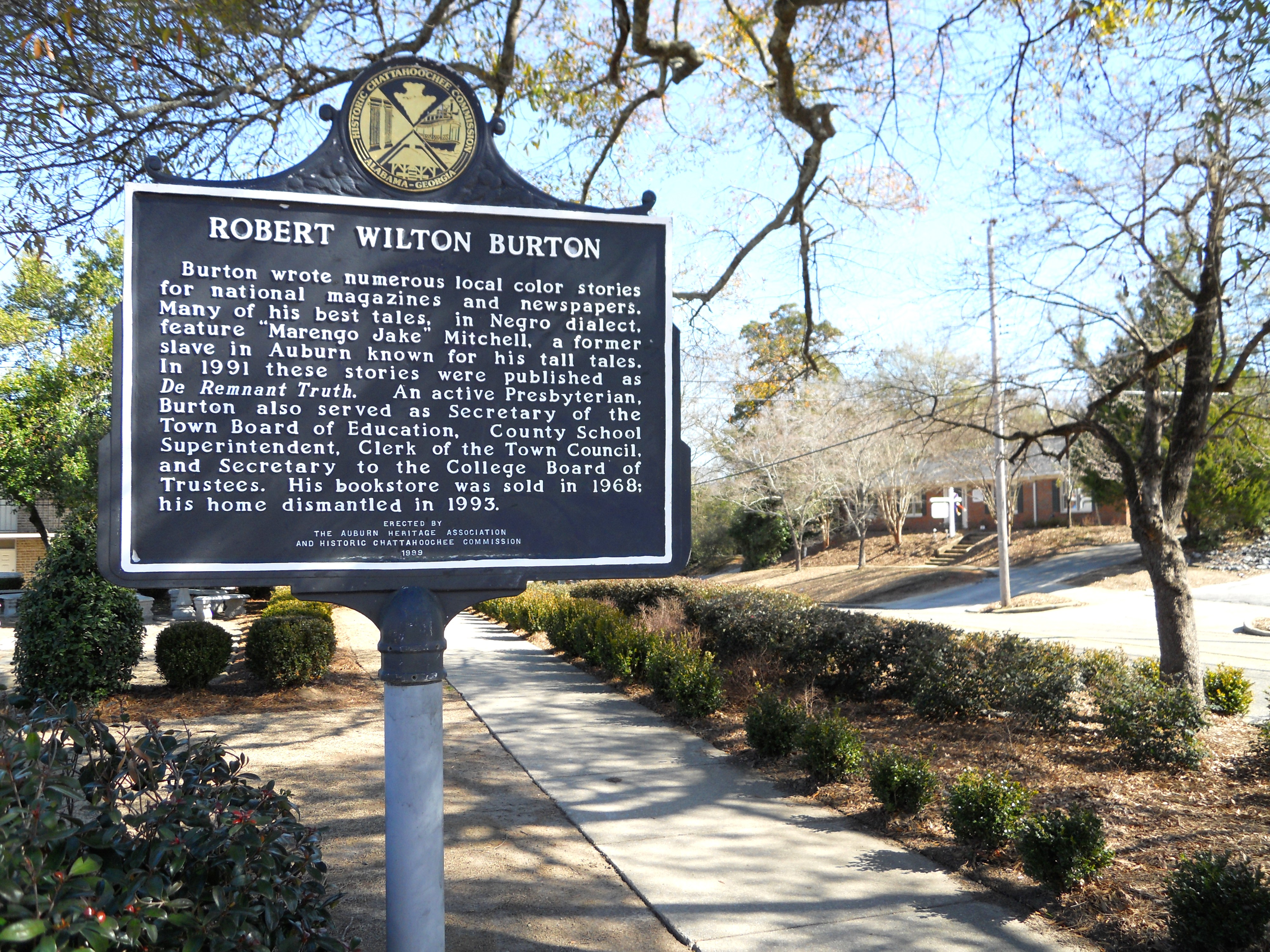
Historic marker

The house was kept by Burton's daughter Miriam Barton Langston until 1977, when she sold it to the Church of Jesus Christ of Latter-day Saints.

The Robert Wilton Burton House was dismantled in 1993, per the historic marker at its site.
