= Burton Court, Linton =

Country house in Linton, Penyard, Herefordshire, England

Coordinates: 51.9132°N 2.4947°W

Burton Court is a grade II listed, large country house near Linton, Penyard, Herefordshire, England.

The house is constructed of brick-faced stone, with five bays. Three bays have lunette windows and a steep pediment. Within the pediment is a diocletian window.

It was built in the 18th century and was owned by the Huntley Family of Boxwell Court, Gloucestershire until 2010.
