= Burton Court, Eardisland =

Grade II* listed country manor house in the Parish of Eardisland, England

Burton Court
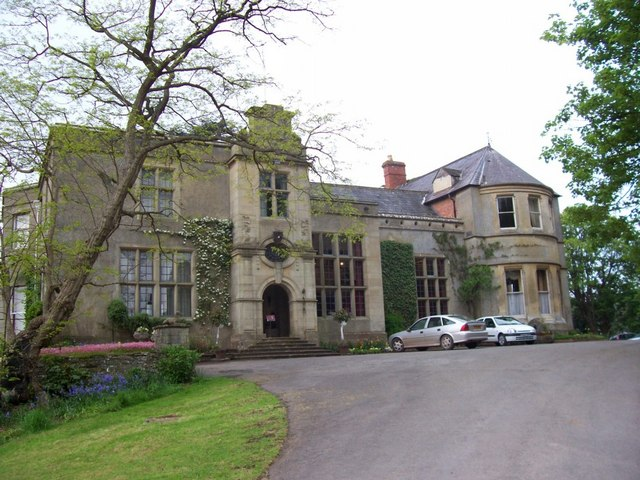
- Burton Court

- Location within Herefordshire

General information
- Location: Eardisland, Herefordshire, England
- Coordinates: 52.209984°N 2.845847°W
- Completed: Early 14th century, 18th century

Burton Court is a Grade II* listed English country manor house in the Parish of Eardisland, southwest of Leominster, Herefordshire, England. The manor dates to at least the 11th century and the current house to the early 14th and 18th century. It lies along the A44 road, about 1 mile (1.6 km) south of Eardisland in the northern part of the hamlet of Lower Burton. It is now run as a wedding and private hire venue. Burton Court featured in Simon Jenkins's book England's Thousand Best Houses.

== History ==
The name Burton is believed to be of Saxon origin, derived from Burh and ton, meaning "fortified dwelling place". The manor of Burton is mentioned in the Domesday Book, with the name Beuretune, where it was valued at 2 "hydes". The manor was documented during the reign of Edward III in 1331; Henry of Monmouth, later to become Henry V, possibly stationed his troops there while surveying the movements of Owain Glyndŵr, the last Welshman to hold the title Prince of Wales.

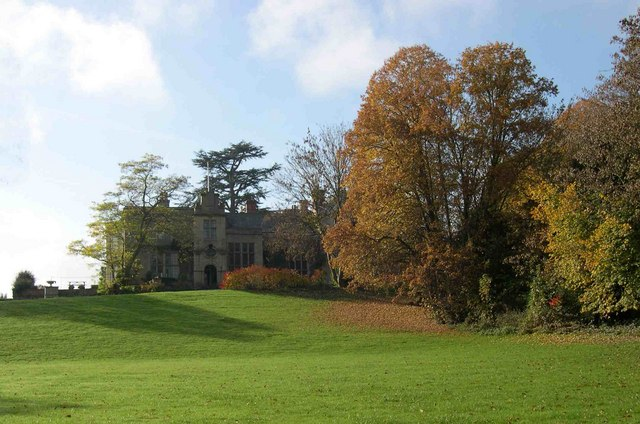

The house was home of the St. Owens (until 1427), Downtons (through marriage), Cotes, Crofts, Jervase Smith (d. 1627), Brewsters (mid-late 17th century until 1865), and Clowes (mid 19th and mid-20th centuries). A notable Brewster was Dr. William Brewster (fl.1665), a scholar with a considerable collection of books, now housed in Hereford Cathedral. In 1960, it was bought by Lieutenant Commander Simpson and has been home to the Simpson family since.

== Architecture and fittings ==
Burke's Guide to Country Houses: Herefordshire, Shropshire, Warwickshire, Worcestershire (1978) mentions that the house was partly rebuilt in the 18th century, probably for William Matthews. His grandson, John Matthews, commissioned James Wyatt to construct Belmont House. However, this is confusing, given that the Brewster family were known to have occupied the estate until 1865.

Burton Court contains architectural pieces from the Norman, Medieval, Regency and Victorian periods. The hall dates to the early 14th century, but much of the house remaining today was added in the 18th century. Remodeling occurred in 1808, which was followed by restorations in 1865, and also in 1912 when the architect Clough Williams-Ellis added the Tudor Revival front. The house is framed in timber. Exterior brick work has been stuccoed. There is a dovecote with a lantern roof. Windows of note are a two-storey bay and an elliptically shaped one. Additional exterior elements are stone mullioning, Doric pilasters, and a moulded architrave. Inside, there are purlins, an overdoor, and a cantilevered stair.

The great hall's dimensions are 35 feet (11 m) long, 24 feet (7.3 m) wide, and 32 feet (9.8 m) in height. A railway room contains a working model railway. There are collections of ship models, natural history items, and European and Oriental costumes and curios. The furnishings are mainly of the Victoria era.

== Grounds ==
Situated in an elevated position overlooking the Herefordshire countryside, a mile south of the River Arrow, the house was built on the site of an ancient camp. A 72 feet (22 m) deep well is on the property, as well as symmetrical oak trees.
