= Burton's Court =

Park in Chelsea, London, England

Coordinates: 51°29′18″N 0°9′35″W

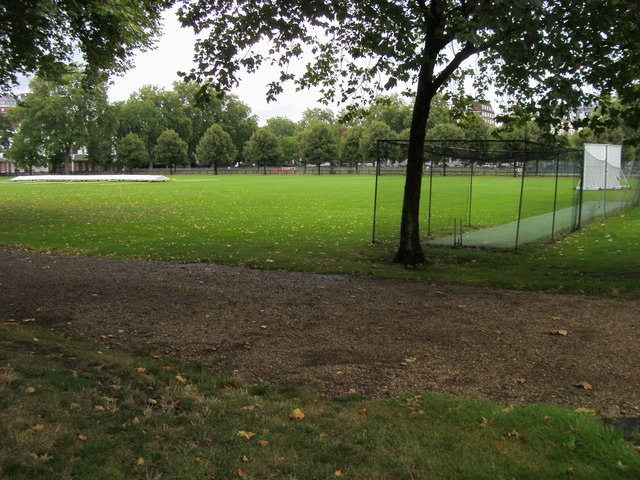
Cricket field on Burton's Court

Burton's Court (also called Burton Court) is a park in Chelsea, London.

It belongs to the Royal Chelsea Hospital which is situated on the southside of Royal Hospital Road, and comprises three tennis courts, a tennis academy and a cricket pitch. Burton Court serves as home ground to the Household Division, thus hosting cricket matches many of which involve Army regiments.

== History ==
In 1687-88 a public footpath was established through the park after the building of the hospital. In 1761 this footpath closed at night, resulting in an extra half a mile for pedestrians to walk around it. Garden Row was built in 1733 facing Burton's Court and by 1794 had seven houses.

== See also ==
- Royal Chelsea Hospital
