= Wire Road Soccer Complex =

American soccer facility

- Auburn Soccer Complex
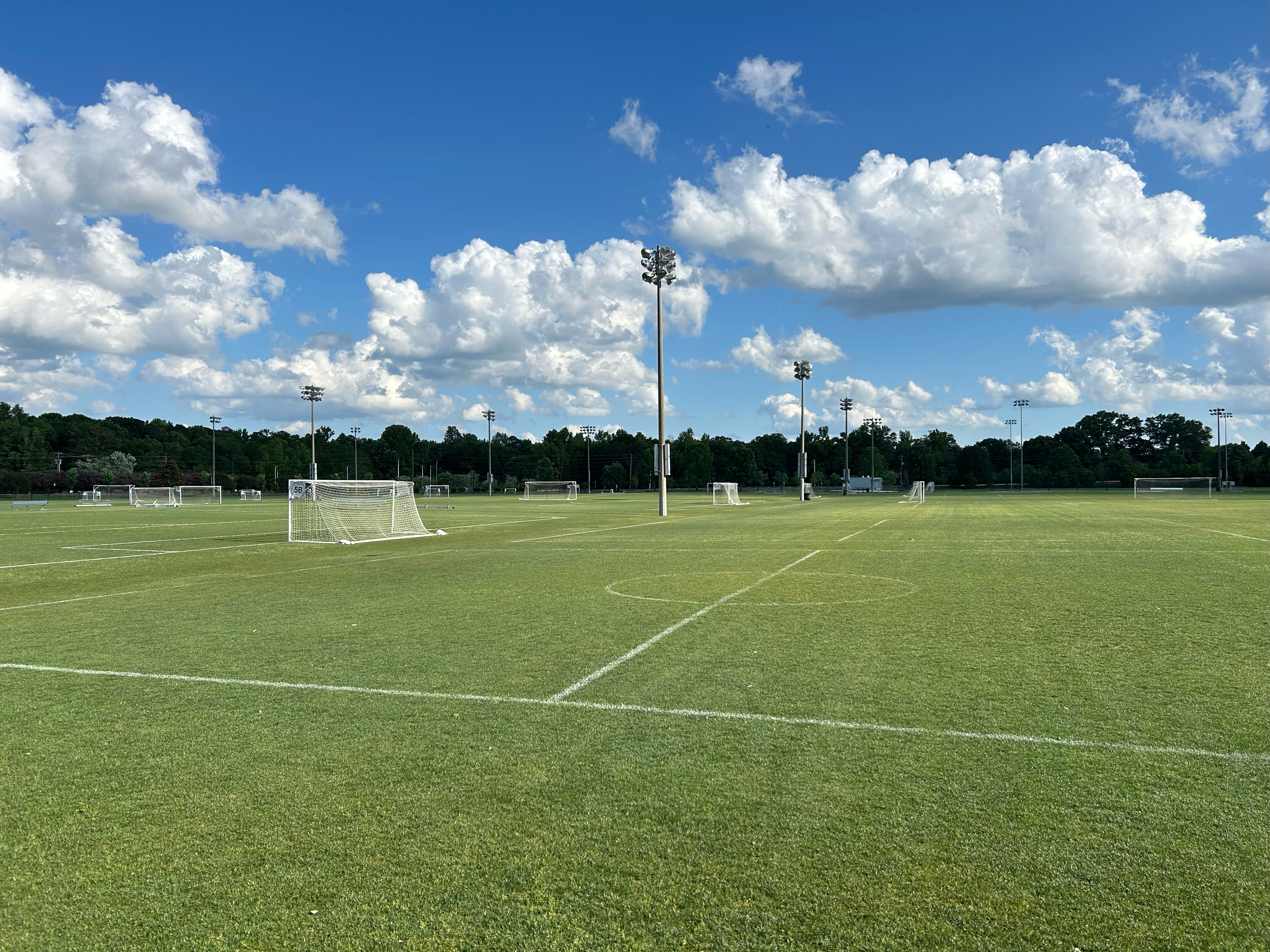
- Interactive map of Wire Road Soccer Complex
- Address: 2340 Wire Rd, Auburn, AL 36832; Auburn, Alabama; United States
- Coordinates: 32.572728°N 85.534030°W
- Operator: Jason Burnett

Construction
- Opened: 1994
- Expanded: 2024

The Wire Road Soccer Complex is primarily a soccer venue located in Auburn, Alabama. After a 2024 expansion, it now has the capacity to host futsal, basketball, and volleyball. The complex has ten numbered fields.

== History ==
The venue opened in 1994 with multiple fields for different levels of youth play. In 2024, it was expanded with the addition of several artificial turf fields alongside an indoor court. The expansion was approved 22 July 2022.

== Events ==
The majority of events hosted are youth events, however there is also an adult league. The youth league has the following age categories: Under-6, Under-8, Under-10, Under-13, Under-16, and Under-19.

== Other purposes ==
The complex is the official voting location for Ward 8 in Auburn, Alabama municipal elections. It was used in 2018 and 2022.
