= Ron Anders Jr. =

American politician

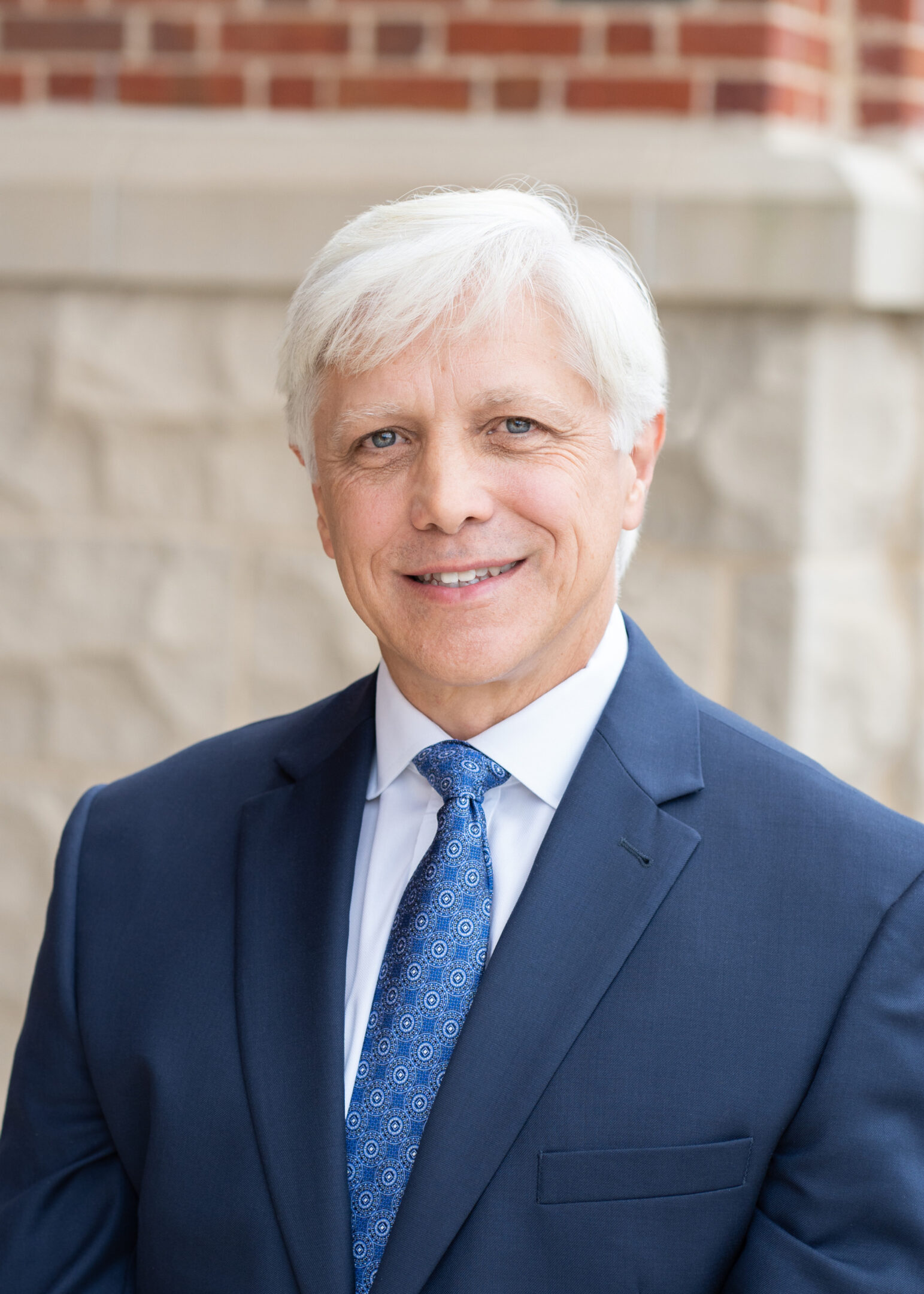

Mayor of Auburn, Alabama
- Incumbent
- Assumed office November 2018
- Preceded by: Bill Ham Jr.

Auburn city council — Ward 2
- In office November 2012 – November 2018
- Preceded by: Sheila Eckman
- Succeeded by: Kelley Griswold

Personal details
- Born: 1963 or 1964 (age 61–62)
- Spouse: Becky (m. 1982)
- Children: 3
- Education: Auburn University
- Website: andersforauburn.com

Ronald Lynn Anders Jr. (born 1963 or 1964) is an American politician who has served as the mayor of Auburn, Alabama, since 2018. He was the CEO of Anders Bookstore prior to his election as mayor in 2018.

== Early life and education ==
Anders attended Auburn High School, graduating in 1982 and graduated from Auburn University in 1986 where he was a cheerleader from 1984 until graduation. He took over as CEO of his family's business, Anders Bookstore, for 20 years until it was sold in 2005 to Follett Higher Education Group before the eventual shutdown of the bookstore in 2022.

== Political career ==
=== City council appointment and election ===
Anders first entered politics after being appointed to the city council by mayor Bill Ham. He was appointed after Sheila Eckman left her seat open. Additionally, he announced that he would be running in the 2014 elections.

He would go on to win the Ward 2 election in 2014, and was elected Mayor Pro Tempore by the city council. He was sworn in on November 3, 2014.

=== Mayor of Auburn ===
After being elected to mayor, Anders stated how proud he was of the local community. During his time as mayor, Anders has helped build the East Alabama Health’s Auburn hospital and worked to improve parks and recreation such as an inclusive playground at Town Creek and further development of the Wire Road Soccer Complex.

== Electoral history ==
2014 Auburn, Alabama municipal election – Ward 2
Candidate	%
Ron Anders Jr.	Unopposed

2018 Auburn, Alabama mayoral election
Candidate	Votes	%
Ron Anders Jr.	3,668	43%
David B. Hill	2,500	29%
Brittany Cannon Dement	2,179	25%
Lindburgh B. Jackson	200	2%
Richard E. Speake	52	1%
Jordan Langdon	21	1%
Total votes	8,620	100%

2018 Auburn, Alabama mayoral election runoff
Candidate	Votes	%
Ron Anders Jr.	4,538	54.2%
David B. Hill	3,831	45.8%
Total votes	8,369	100.0%

2022 Auburn, Alabama mayoral election
Candidate	Votes	%
Ron Anders Jr.	Uncontested	100%

== Personal life ==
Anders is married to Becky Anders with three kids, Camille, Joshua, and Patrick.
