= Kinnucan's =

Alabama department store

- Company type: Incorporated
- Industry: Retail
- Founded: 1987
- Headquarters: Auburn, Alabama, United States
- Products: Apparel; Fashion; Footwear; Collegiate; Sunglasses; Fashion Sportswear; Activewear; Adventure Supplies
- Website: http://www.kinnucans.com/

Kinnucan's is an Alabama-based department store specialising in the sale of clothing.

== History ==
Kinnucan's /kɪˈnuːkənz/ is a department store that was founded in 1987 by Charles Anthony Kinnucan (August 1, 1960 - July 1, 2011) as a small shoe store in Auburn, Alabama. Originally named "On Your Feet", the business model transformed into an Outdoor and Lifestyle Inspired store. The abbreviated logo for the company is KSO, Kinnucan's Specialty Outfitter.

Kinnucan's, in addition to the Auburn, AL store has locations in Alpharetta, Georgia; Atlanta, Georgia; Peachtree Corners, Georgia; Columbus, Georgia; and Opelika, Alabama. The company has branched out into many areas of retail and now sells clothing and accessories for casual everyday wear. Kinnucan's has always represented the market for adventurers with light selections of camping gear, kayaks, and accessories, but the company retains its majority of products in lifestyle apparel and footwear.

Kinnucan's wide customer base is reflected in their variety of brands and goods. Some brands seen in all stores are The North Face, Patagonia, Nike Columbia Sportswear, Southern Marsh, IVAR, Southern Shirt Company, Yeti Coolers, Olukai, Mountain Khakis, Maui Jim Sunglasses and many others. In recent years, Kinnucan's has rapidly increased the footprint of their women's fashion department.

College Sports have played a large factor in Kinnucan's expansion. With 3 stores in college towns, the student market is a relatively large portion of Kinnucan's customer base. Schools that Kinnucan's supports include: Auburn University, The University of Alabama, The University of Georgia.

Kinnucan's has since closed all storefronts and ended social media advertising as of summer 2019
