= 2014 Auburn, Alabama municipal election =

The 2014 Auburn, Alabama municipal election was held on 26 August 2014. Both the mayor and all eight members of the city council were elected. The election date was announced on 3 July 2014.

== Mayoral election ==
2014 Auburn, Alabama mayoral election
- August 26, 2014
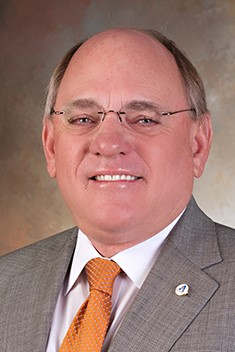
Candidate	Bill Ham Jr.
Party	Nonpartisan
Popular vote	Uncontested
Mayor before election
Bill Ham Jr.
Elected mayor
Bill Ham Jr.

The incumbent mayor Bill Ham Jr. ran unopposed in the mayoral election.

== City council elections ==
Four of the eight city council members ran unopposed, with three of those being incumbents.

=== Ward 1 ===
Leading up to the election, two lawsuits were filed against Clemon Byrd, claiming that his house was not in the boundary lines of Ward 1. The first lawsuit was dismissed following advice from attorney John Michael Segrest that the Lee County Circuit Court does not have the ability to remove a candidate's name form the ballot. The second lawsuit, filed by the Dowdell family, was dismissed in September 2014.

2014 Auburn, Alabama municipal election – Ward 1
Candidate	Votes	%
Clemon E. Byrd	252	63.2%
Arthur L. Dowdell Sr.	147	36.8%
Total votes	399	100.0%

==== Aftermath ====
After the election results were published, a fight broke out at Auburn City Hall among supporters of Arthur Dowdell. Dowdell made claims of voter fraud, claiming that people voted twice, and "Clemon Byrd, once again, stole this election."

=== Ward 2 ===
2014 Auburn, Alabama municipal election – Ward 2
Candidate	Votes	%
Ron Anders Jr.	Unopposed	100%

=== Ward 3 ===
2014 Auburn, Alabama municipal election – Ward 3
Candidate	Votes	%
Beth Witten	219	55.7%
Wendell McClain	174	44.3%
Total votes	393	100.0%

=== Ward 4 ===
2014 Auburn, Alabama municipal election – Ward 4
Candidate	Votes	%
Brent Beard	Unopposed	100%

=== Ward 5 ===
2014 Auburn, Alabama municipal election – Ward 5
Candidate	Votes	%
Lynda V. Tremaine	753	83.9%
Robin Kelley	144	16.1%
Total votes	897	100.0%

=== Ward 6 ===
2014 Auburn, Alabama municipal election – Ward 6
Candidate	Votes	%
Dick Phelan	253	62.2%
Brad Donnelly	154	37.8%
Total votes	407	100%

=== Ward 7 ===
2014 Auburn, Alabama municipal election – Ward 7
Candidate	Votes	%
Gene Dulaney	Unopposed	100%

=== Ward 8 ===
2014 Auburn, Alabama municipal election – Ward 8
Candidate	Votes	%
Thomas Dawson	Unopposed	100%

== Alternate voting options ==
Absentee ballots were due by 25 August 2014.

== Election summary ==
Position	Before election	After election	Image
Mayor	Bill Ham Jr.	Bill Ham Jr.	
Ward 1	Arthur L. Dowdell Sr.	Clemon Byrd	
Ward 2	Ron Anders Jr. (Note: Anders was appointed in 2012 after Sheila Eckman resigned, after being elected to the Lee County Commission.)	Ron Anders Jr.	
Ward 3	Thomas Worden	Beth Witten	
Ward 4	Brent Beard	Brent Beard	
Ward 5	Robin Kelley	Lynda Tremaine	
Ward 6	Dick Phelan	Dick Phelan	
Ward 7	Gene Dulaney	Gene Dulaney	
Ward 8	Bob Norman	Thomas Dawson	
