= Louise Kreher Forest Ecology Preserve =

Nature reserve in Alabama, United States

Kreher Preserve and Nature Center
- Location within Alabama
- Location: 2222 North College Street; Auburn, Alabama
- Coordinates: 32°38′38″N 85°28′53″W
- Area: 120 acres (0 km^{2})
- Established: 1993
- Manager: Auburn University School of Forestry & Wildlife Sciences
- Website: wp.auburn.edu/preserve/

Kreher Preserve and Nature Center (KPNC), previously known as the Louise Kreher Forest Ecology Preserve, is a 120 acres (0.49 km^{2}) nature preserve located between Auburn and Opelika in Lee County, Alabama. Established in 1993 through a gift, it is operated as a non-profit outreach program of Auburn University's School of Forestry & Wildlife Sciences. The nature center includes a nature playground, amphitheater, wheel-chair accessible 150-seat multi-level meeting area and fire pit, and a covered educational pavilion. There are interpretive signs along the 30 trails that cover 6 miles, restrooms, and drinking fountains.

The KPNC offers environmental education and outreach programs including animal encounters and guided walks, day camps and pre-school programs.

The KPNC was established by Dr. Louise Kreher Turner (1914-2012) and her husband Frank Allen Turner, who donated and endowed the property to Auburn University for conservation and educational purposes.
