= Chewacla State Park =

State park in Alabama, United States

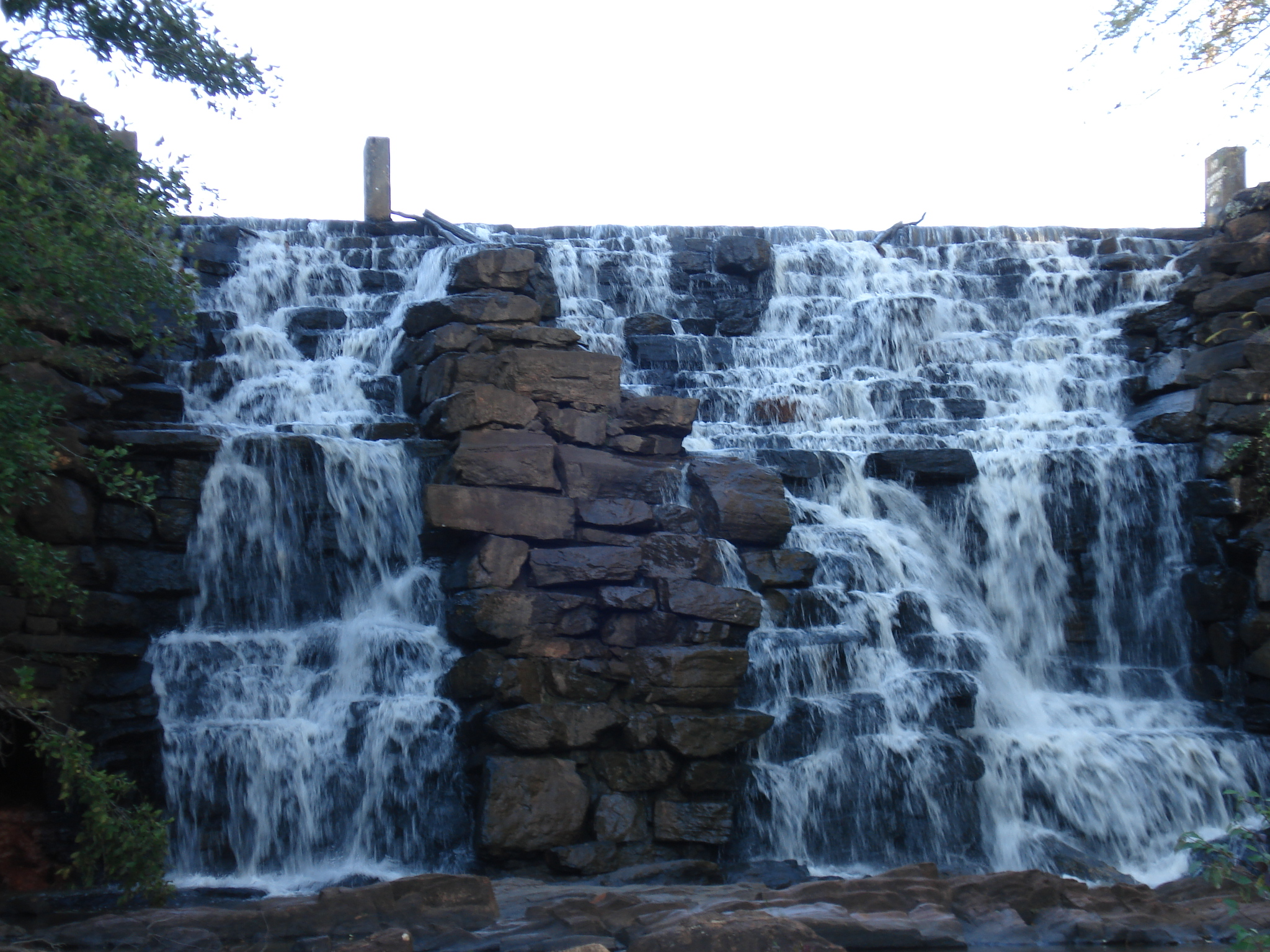
- Chewacla Falls

- Location within Alabama
- Interactive map of Chewacla State Park
- Location: Auburn, Alabama, United States
- Coordinates: 32°32′55″N 85°28′42″W
- Area: 696 acres (282 ha)
- Elevation: 407 ft (124 m)
- Established: 1939
- Administrator: Alabama Department of Conservation and Natural Resources
- Website: Official website

Chewacla State Park is a public recreation area occupying 696 acres (282 ha) below Interstate 85 on the far south side of Auburn, Alabama. The state park's central feature, 26-acre (11 ha) Lake Chewacla, provides opportunities for fishing, swimming, and non-motorized boating.

== History ==
In the late nineteenth century, Wright's Mill occupied a site in the park where swimmers could find a place to splash about in the mill's surrounding pool. In the 1930s, workers with the Civilian Conservation Corps developed roads, foot trails, and park buildings. Their efforts can be seen in the park's stone cabins and arched masonry bridge. They also constructed the dam that created Chewacla Lake. The state took possession, opening the grounds as Chewacla State Park, in 1939.

== Awards ==
In June 2011, The United States Department of the Interior presented Chewacla State Park with a National Recreation award. Chewacla was one of 41 parks to receive this honor. In September 2020, Chewacla State Park was one of eleven Alabama state parks awarded Tripadvisor’s Traveler’s Choice Award, which recognizes businesses and attractions that earn consistently high user reviews.

== Activities and amenities ==
In addition to water activities, the park features a system of trails for hiking and for mountain biking. Its trail system was designated as a National Recreation Trail in 2011. The park has facilities for RV and tent camping in addition to its renovated CCC–era cabins. In 2018, Chewacla received roughly 75,000 day passes along with 1,500 cabins rentals and 6,500 camping permits.
