= Southern Marsh Collection =

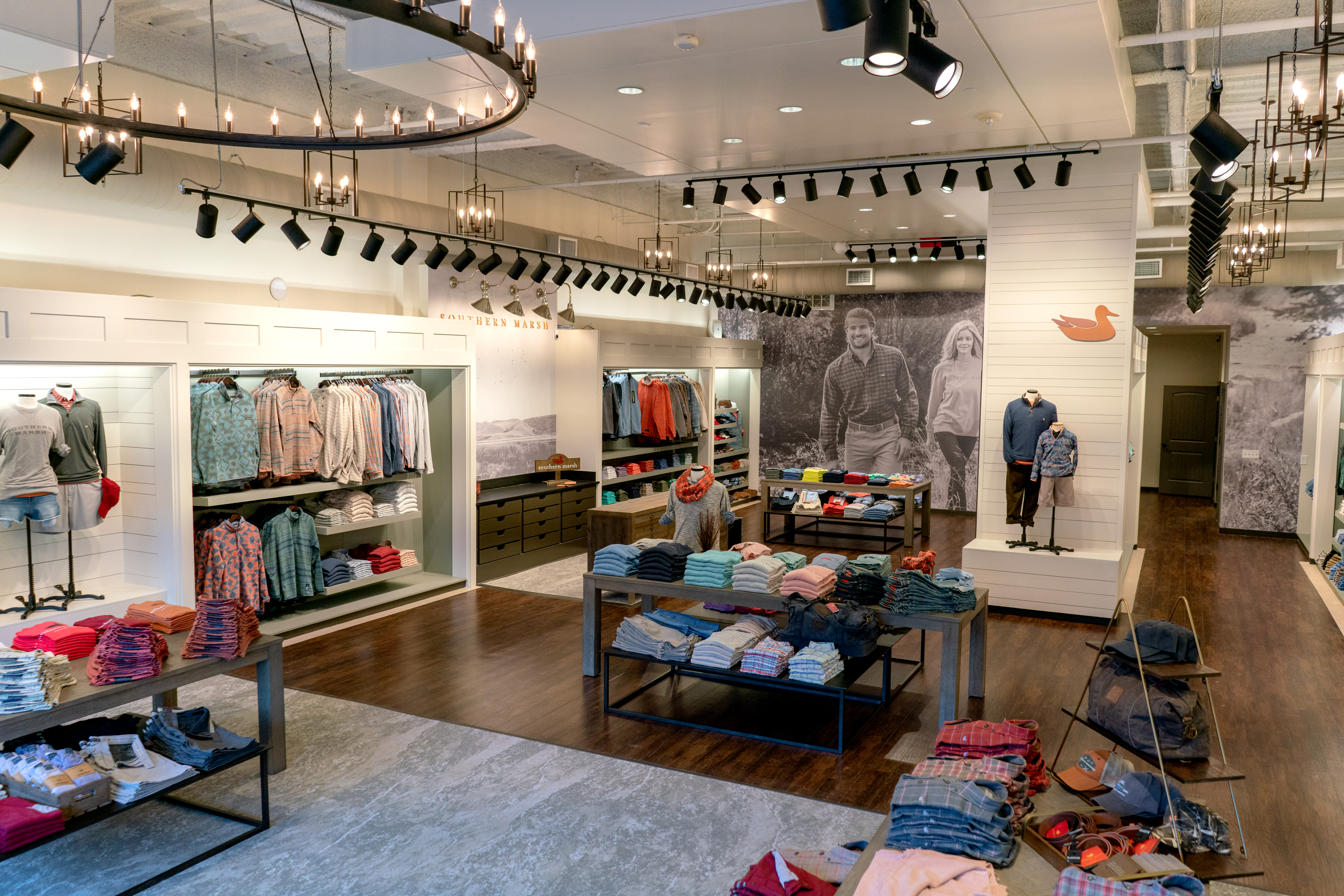
- A Southern Marsh Store at Market Street in The Woodlands, Texas
- Type: Private
- Industry: Retail
- Founded: 2008; 18 years ago
- Founders: Matthew Valiollahi and Stephen Smith
- Headquarters: Baton Rouge, LA, United States
- Products: Clothing and accessories
- Website: www.southernmarsh.com

Southern Marsh Collection, also known as Southern Marsh, is an American clothing and accessories retailer headquartered in Baton Rouge, Louisiana.

Founded in 2007 by Matthew Valiollahi and Stephen Smith, the brand markets a variety of shirts, shorts, pants, outerwear and accessories that aim to represent Southern culture.

== History ==
In 2007, founders Matthew Valiollahi and Stephen Smith, both students of Louisiana State University at the time, decided to create a brand of T-shirts and casual wear inspired by Southern style. As a senior in his final year, Matthew approached his friend Stephen to design the brand, from which came the trademark mallard logo and general aesthetic of the company.

At first, the two simply sold their designs, but then moved into designing fabrics from the ground up. Walter Morales, then an adjunct professor at Louisiana State University, helped the pair refine their business plan.

== Locations ==
The company partners with over 700 retailers across the United States, and has factory operations throughout Asia. In addition, the company has expanded its sales to online shoppers, and also manufactures licensed college apparel. In August, 2015, the company was listed as #689 in Inc. Magazine's 5,000 fastest growing companies in America.

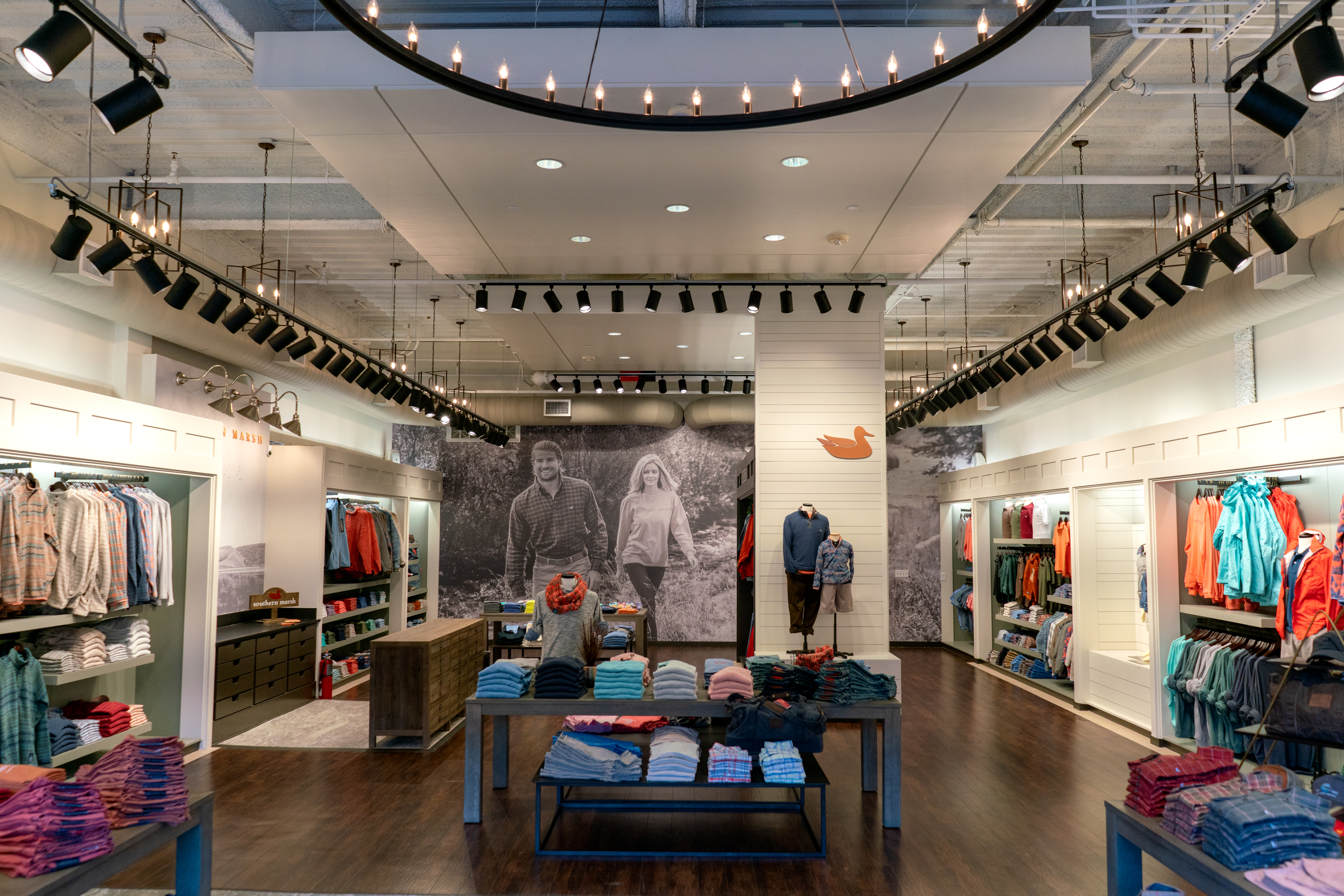
Front and center at the first Southern Marsh brick and mortar in The Woodlands, Texas

In October 2018, the store's first brick and mortar opened at Market Street in The Woodlands, TX.

== Products ==
Originally, the brand sold only T-shirts. Now, the company markets a variety of clothing and accessories including, but not limited to: shorts, pants, dress shirts, jackets, pullovers, polos, bags, performance clothing, and hats. Their product line has significantly grown since 2007, mainly due to sizable revenue growth allowing for expansion. Southern Marsh clothing can be found at many high-end retailers across the country, like Apple's Limited in Poplarville, MS.
