= 2018 Auburn, Alabama municipal election =

The 2018 Auburn, Alabama municipal election was held on August 28, 2018, to elect members to the city council and mayoral positions.

== Electoral process ==
Candidates must be at least 18 years old, have lived in Auburn for at least 90 days, be a U.S. citizen for at least one day, and be registered to vote. If no candidate receives a majority of the vote, then a runoff election is scheduled.

== Mayoral election ==
2018 Auburn, Alabama mayoral election
- October 9, 2018
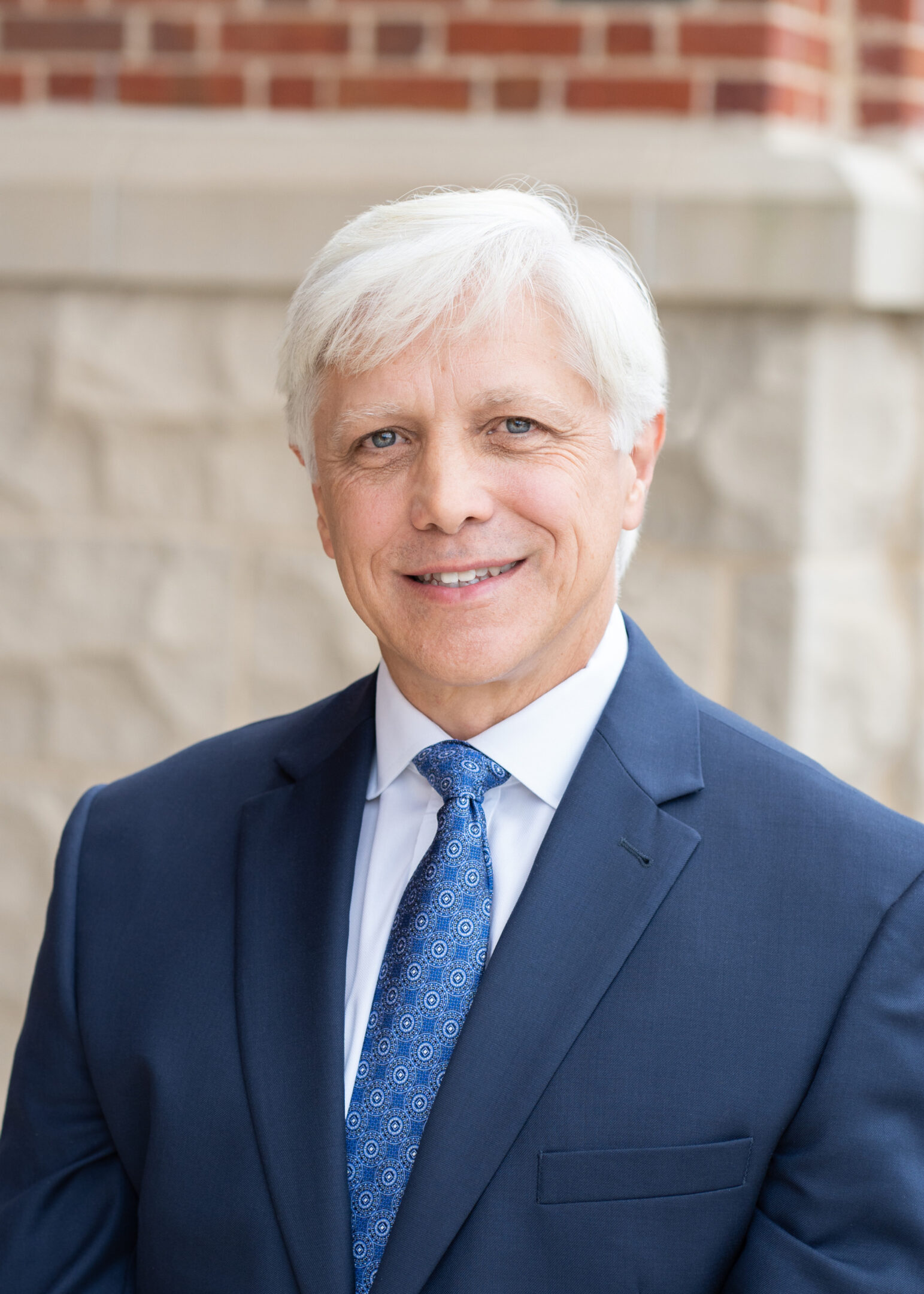

| Candidate | Ron Anders Jr. | David B. Hill |
| Party | Nonpartisan | Nonpartisan |
| Popular vote | 4,538 | 3,831 |
| Percentage | 54.2% | 45.8% |
Mayor before election
Bill Ham Jr.
Elected mayor
Ron Anders Jr.

Incumbent mayor Bill Ham announced that he would not be running for re-election on 29 May 2018. Bill Ham had served as mayor of Auburn since 1998.

=== Candidates ===
==== Endorsements ====
Ron Anders Jr.

Mayors

- Bill Ham Jr. (1998–2018), outgoing mayor of Auburn, Alabama

==== Ron Anders Jr. ====
Former councilman Ron Anders Jr. announced his bid for mayor after an endorsement from incumbent Bill Ham. He focused most on public safety and education, promising to provide safety to the community while giving them what they want.

==== Brittany Cannon Dement ====
Brittany Cannon Dement was the only woman who ran for mayor. She focused her campaign on looking at Auburn's future over the next ten to fifteen years. She also wanted to make the government more transparent for the average citizen, including open mayoral forums.

==== David Hill ====
David Hill focused on how to better plan the city. One goal of his was to better educate the population on zoning laws and how they work, so that they will be able to offer their own input into the plans.

==== Lindburgh Jackson ====
Lindburgh Jackson ran to improve the treatment of the northwest area of Auburn, and focus on diversity issues in the community.

==== Jordan Langdon ====
Auburn University student Jordan Langdon filed paperwork to run for mayor on 24 July 2018. He ran on a platform to try to give younger people a chance.

==== Richard Speake ====
Richard Speake ran on a platform of the environment, joking about being the "Green" candidate in the race. One of his main focuses was banning styrofoam in the city. He was arrested twice following the election, for public intoxication and criminal trespassing.

=== Debates and forums ===
2018 Auburn, Alabama mayoral debates
| No. | Date | Host | Link | Participants | | | | | |
P Participant A Absent
| P Participant A Absent | | | | Anders Jr. | Dement | Hill | Jackson | Langdon | Speake |
|---|---|---|---|---|---|---|---|---|---|
| 1 | Aug 23, 2018 | Auburn Chamber of Commerce | YouTube | P | P | P | P | A | P |

=== First round ===
Six candidates were on the ballot for the first round of voting. No candidate received a majority of the votes, so the top two candidates by popular vote qualified for the final round of voting.

2018 Auburn, Alabama mayoral election
| Candidate | Votes | % |
|---|---|---|
| Ron Anders Jr. | 3,668 | 42.6% |
| David B. Hill | 2,500 | 29.0% |
| Brittany Cannon Dement | 2,179 | 25.3% |
| Lindburgh B. Jackson | 200 | 2.3% |
| Richard E. Speake | 52 | 0.6% |
| Jordan Langdon | 21 | 0.2% |
| Total votes | 8,620 | 100.0% |

=== Runoff ===
The top two candidates from the first round, former councilman Ron Anders Jr, and David Hill, advanced. The election was scheduled for 9 October 2018.

2018 Auburn, Alabama mayoral election runoff
| Candidate | Votes | % |
|---|---|---|
| Ron Anders Jr. | 4,538 | 54.2% |
| David B. Hill | 3,831 | 45.8% |
| Total votes | 8,369 | 100.0% |

== City council elections ==
Three of the eight incumbents chose to run for re-election.

=== Ward 1 ===
Connie Fitch Taylor won the election with 69% of the vote.

2018 Auburn, Alabama municipal election – Ward 1
| Candidate | Votes | % |
|---|---|---|
| Connie Fitch Taylor | 329 | 69.1% |
| Verlinda J. White | 147 | 30.9% |
| Total votes | 476 | 100.0% |

=== Ward 2 ===
As no candidate received a majority of the vote, Kelley Griswold and Todd Scholl advanced to the runoff election on 9 October 2018.

2018 Auburn, Alabama municipal election – Ward 2
| Candidate | Votes | % |
|---|---|---|
| Kelley Griswold | 692 | 38.2% |
| Todd D. Scholl | 418 | 23.1% |
| Anthony Brock | 333 | 18.4% |
| Phil Chansler | 174 | 9.6% |
| Hal Walker | 156 | 8.6% |
| Stephen "Kyle" Mosely | 37 | 2.0% |
| Total votes | 1,810 | 100.0% |

==== Runoff ====
2018 Auburn, Alabama municipal election – Ward 2 runoff
| Candidate | Votes | % |
|---|---|---|
| Kelley Griswold | 1,093 | 63.7% |
| Todd D. Scholl | 623 | 36.3% |
| Total votes | 1,716 | 100.0% |

=== Ward 3 ===
As the only candidate, Beth Witten was elected to the city council unopposed.

2018 Auburn, Alabama municipal election – Ward 3
| Candidate | Votes | % |
|---|---|---|
| Beth Witten | Unnopposed | 100% |

=== Ward 4 ===
No candidate received a majority of the vote, so the top two candidates, Brett Smith and Jim Ryan, advanced to a runoff.

2018 Auburn, Alabama municipal election – Ward 4
| Candidate | Votes | % |
|---|---|---|
| Brett Smith | 355 | 49.2% |
| Jim Ryan | 241 | 33.4% |
| Barry Davis | 125 | 17.3% |
| Total votes | 721 | 100.0% |

==== Runoff ====
2018 Auburn, Alabama municipal election – Ward 4 runoff
| Candidate | Votes | % |
|---|---|---|
| Brett Smith | 424 | 63.8% |
| Jim Ryan | 241 | 36.2% |
| Total votes | 665 | 100.0% |

=== Ward 5 ===
No candidate won a majority of the votes, so Steven Dixon and Walter Northcutt advanced to the runoff.

2018 Auburn, Alabama municipal election – Ward 5
| Candidate | Votes | % |
|---|---|---|
| Steven Dixon | 651 | 36.5% |
| Walter M. Northcutt | 619 | 34.7% |
| Brian P. O'Neil | 512 | 28.7% |
| Total votes | 1,782 | 100.0% |

==== Runoff ====
2018 Auburn, Alabama municipal election – Ward 5 runoff
| Candidate | Votes | % |
|---|---|---|
| Steven Dixon | 1,140 | 59.3% |
| Walter M. Northcutt | 782 | 40.7% |
| Total votes | 1,922 | 100.0% |

=== Ward 6 ===
Sarah Brown and Bob Parsons moved to a runoff due to neither candidate receiving a majority of the vote.

2018 Auburn, Alabama municipal election – Ward 6
| Candidate | Votes | % |
|---|---|---|
| Sarah Brown | 378 | 43.9% |
| Bob Parsons | 306 | 35.5% |
| Brad Donnelly | 178 | 20.6% |
| Total votes | 862 | 100.0% |

==== Runoff ====
Bob Parsons won the runoff in the closest election of the day.

===== Endorsements =====
Bob Parsons

Candidate

- Brad Donnelly, eliminated in first round

===== Results =====
2018 Auburn, Alabama municipal election – Ward 6 runoff
| Candidate | Votes | % |
|---|---|---|
| Bob Parsons | 438 | 50.8% |
| Sarah Brown | 425 | 49.2% |
| Total votes | 863 | 100.0% |

=== Ward 7 ===
Jay Hovey won the election with 54% of the vote.

2018 Auburn, Alabama municipal election – Ward 7
| Candidate | Votes | % |
|---|---|---|
| Jay Hovey | 711 | 54.3% |
| Laura Mirarchi | 254 | 19.4% |
| Jay Conner | 178 | 13.6% |
| Andrew Puent | 104 | 7.9% |
| Amy C. Crew | 63 | 4.8% |
| Total votes | 1,310 | 100.0% |

=== Ward 8 ===
Tommy Dawson won the election with 52% of the vote.

2018 Auburn, Alabama municipal election – Ward 8
| Candidate | Votes | % |
|---|---|---|
| Tommy Dawson | 419 | 52.4% |
| Marlene Bowman | 380 | 47.6% |
| Total votes | 799 | 100.0% |

== Election summary ==
| Position | Before election | After election | Image |
|---|---|---|---|
| Mayor | Bill Ham Jr. | Ron Anders Jr. | |
| Ward 1 | Verlinda White | Connie Fitch-Taylor | |
| Ward 2 | Ron Anders Jr. | Kelley Griswold | |
| Ward 3 | Beth Witten | Beth Witten | |
| Ward 4 | Brent Beard | Brett Smith | |
| Ward 5 | Lynda Tremaine | Steven Dixon | |
| Ward 6 | Dick Phelan | Bob Parsons | |
| Ward 7 | Gene Dulaney | Jay Hovey | |
| Ward 8 | Tommy Dawson | Tommy Dawson | |
