= 2022 Auburn, Alabama municipal election =

The 2022 Auburn, Alabama municipal election was held on August 23, 2022, from 7am to 7pm, to elect members of the city council and mayor. Winners were sworn in on 7 November.

== Electoral process ==
Candidates must be at least 18 years old, have lived in Auburn for at least 90 days, be a U.S. Citizen, and be registered to vote. Candidates for city council must have lived in their district for 90 days. If no candidate receives a majority of the vote, then a runoff election is scheduled.

== Mayoral election ==
2022 Auburn, Alabama mayoral election
- August 23, 2022
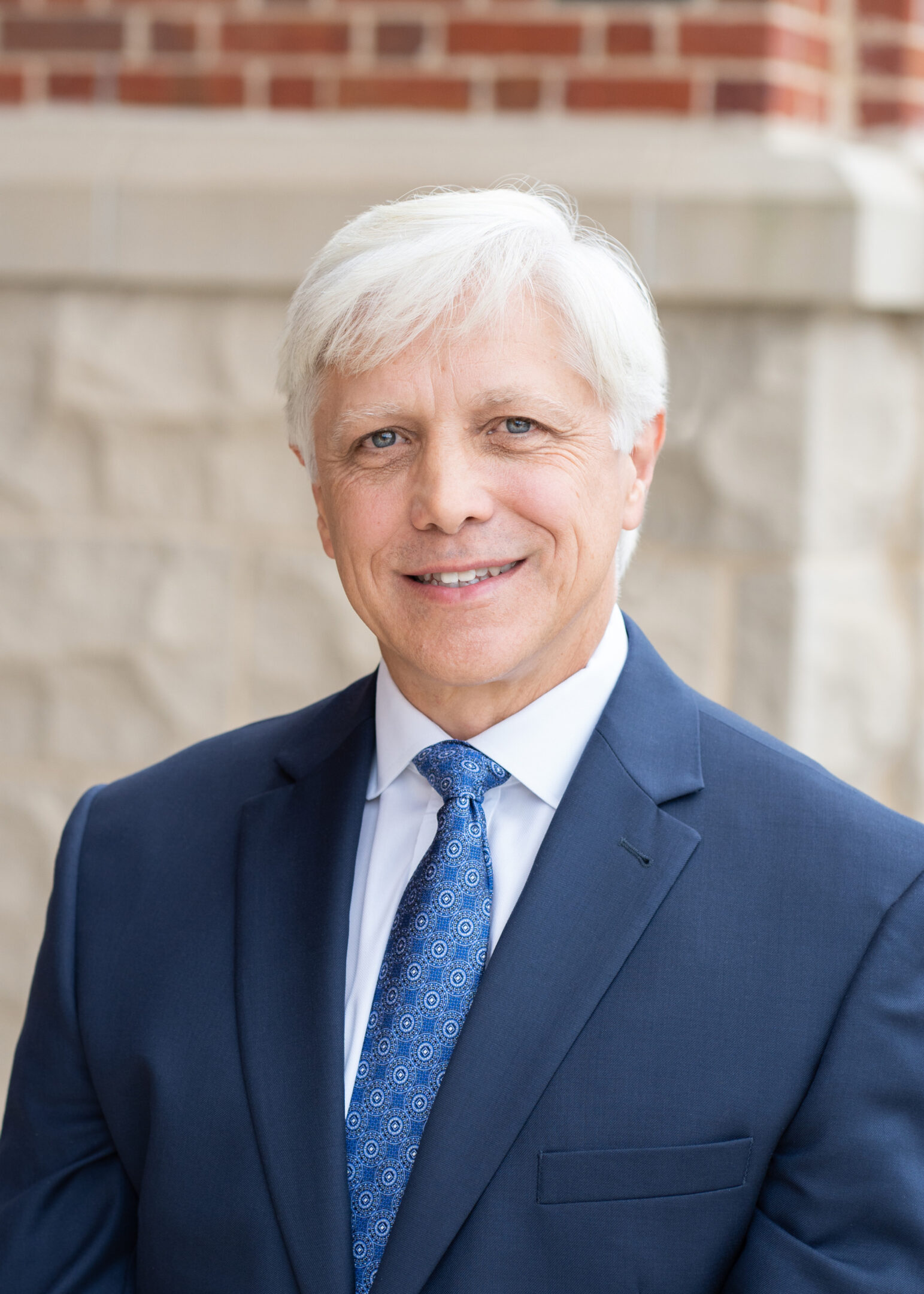
Candidate	Ron Anders Jr.
Party	Nonpartisan
Popular vote	Uncontested
Mayor before election
Ron Anders Jr.
Elected mayor
Ron Anders Jr.

On February 24, 2022, incumbent mayor Ron Anders Jr. announced his intent to run for re-election.

As the only qualified candidate, he won the election and was sworn in on November 7, 2022.

== City council elections ==
Five of the eight seats were contested, with four incumbents running for re-election.

=== Ward 1 ===
Two candidates qualified for the ballot. Incumbent Connie Fitch-Taylor won the election.

2022 Auburn, Alabama municipal election – Ward 1
Candidate	Votes	%
Connie Fitch-Taylor	216	70.36%
Arthur L. Dowdell Sr.	91	29.64%
Total votes	307	100.00

=== Ward 2 ===
Two candidates qualified for the ballot. Incumbent Kelley Griswold won the election.

2022 Auburn, Alabama municipal election – Ward 2
Candidate	Votes	%
Kelley Griswold	385	61.4%
Paul West	242	38.6%
Total votes	627	100.0%

=== Ward 3 ===
One candidate qualified for the ballot, so no election was held.

2022 Auburn, Alabama municipal election – Ward 3
Candidate	Votes	%
Beth Witten	Unnopposed	100%

=== Ward 4 ===
Two candidates qualified for the ballot, but no election was held. Tyler Adams was given the role after the withdrawal of Chad Leverette.

2022 Auburn, Alabama municipal election – Ward 4
Candidate	Votes	%
Tyler Adams	Unnopposed	100%

=== Ward 5 ===
Three candidates qualified for the ballot. Financial advisor Sonny Moreman won the election.

2022 Auburn, Alabama municipal election – Ward 5
Candidate	Votes	%
Sonny Moreman	416	56.29%
Sarah Jane Levine	261	35.32%
Leah Billye Welburn V	62	8.39%
Total votes	739	100.00%

=== Ward 6 ===
Two candidates qualified for the ballot. Incumbent Bob Parsons filed his statement of candidacy on June 16, 2022. He went on to win the election.

2022 Auburn, Alabama municipal election – Ward 6
Candidate	Votes	%
Bob Parsons	347	85.05%
Phillip Pollard	61	14.95%
Total votes	408	100.00%

=== Ward 7 ===
Three candidates qualified for the ballot, but incumbent Jay Hovey withdrew before the election, leaving two on-ballot candidates. Max Coblentz won the election.

2022 Auburn, Alabama municipal election – Ward 7
Candidate	Votes	%
Max Coblentz	892	61.1%
Greg Lane	568	38.9%
Total votes	1,460	100.0%

=== Ward 8 ===
One candidate qualified for the ballot, so no election was held.

2022 Auburn, Alabama municipal election – Ward 8
Candidate	Votes	%
Tommy Dawson	Unnopposed	100%

== Election summary ==
Position	Before election	After election	Image
Mayor	Ron Anders Jr.	Ron Anders Jr.	
Ward 1	Connie Fitch-Taylor	Connie Fitch-Taylor	
Ward 2	Kelley Griswold	Kelley Griswold	
Ward 3	Beth Witten	Beth Witten	
Ward 4	Brett Smith	Tyler Adams	
Ward 5	Steven Dixon	Sonny Moreman	
Ward 6	Bob Parsons	Bob Parsons	
Ward 7	Jay Hovey	Max Coblentz	
Ward 8	Tommy Dawson	Tommy Dawson	

== See also ==
- List of mayors of Auburn, Alabama
