= Auburn, Alabama =

City in Alabama, United States

- City
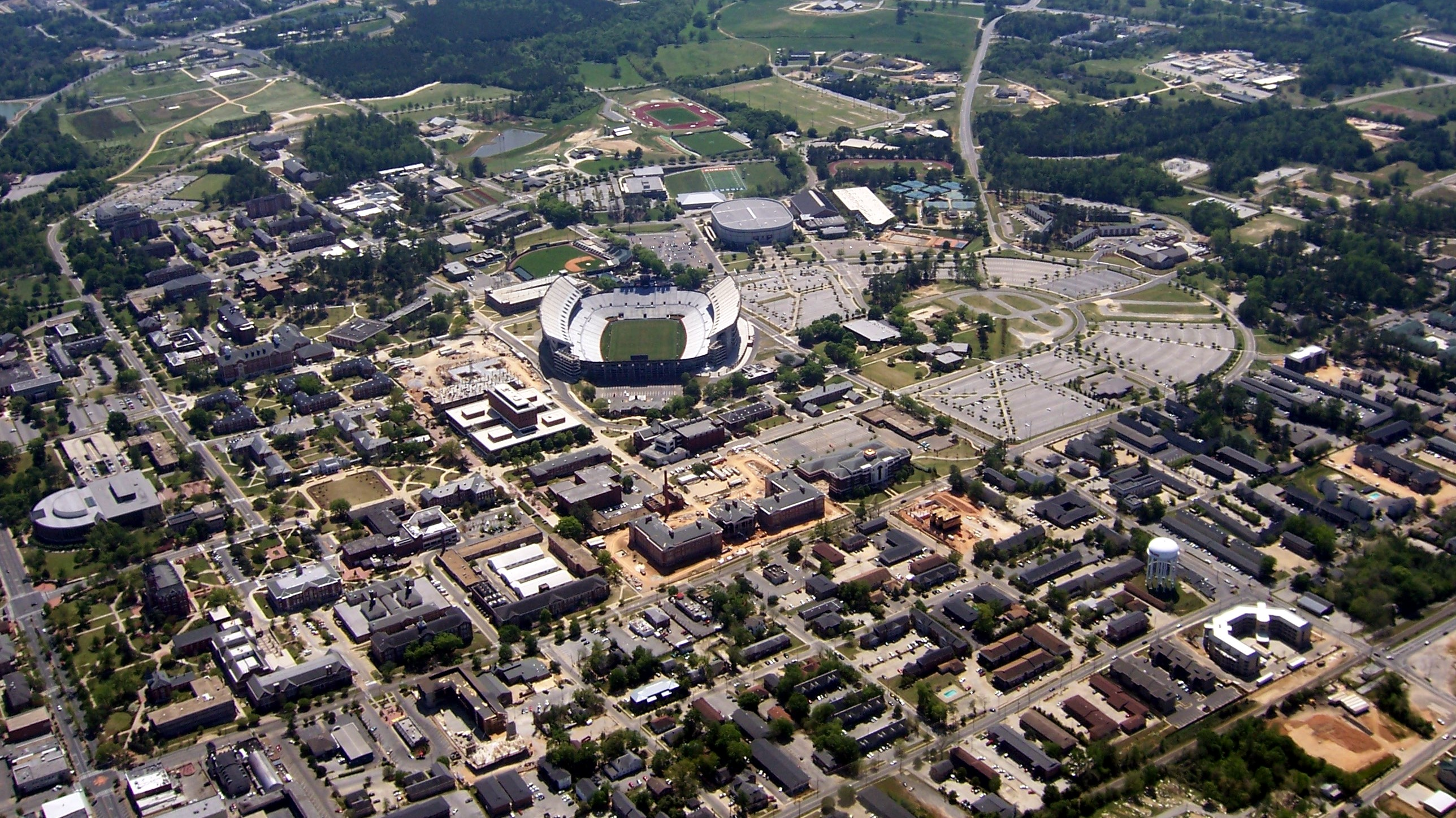
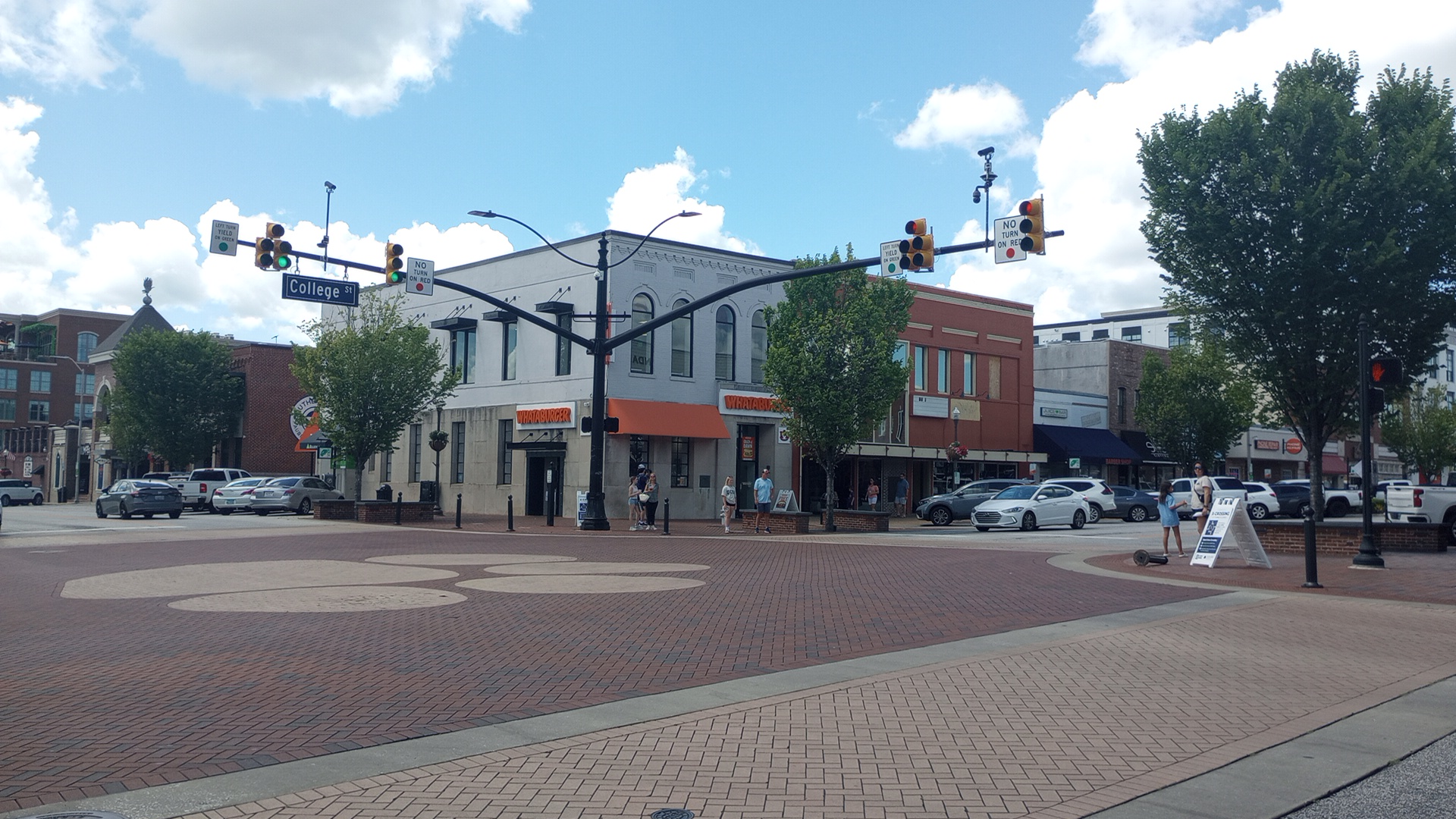
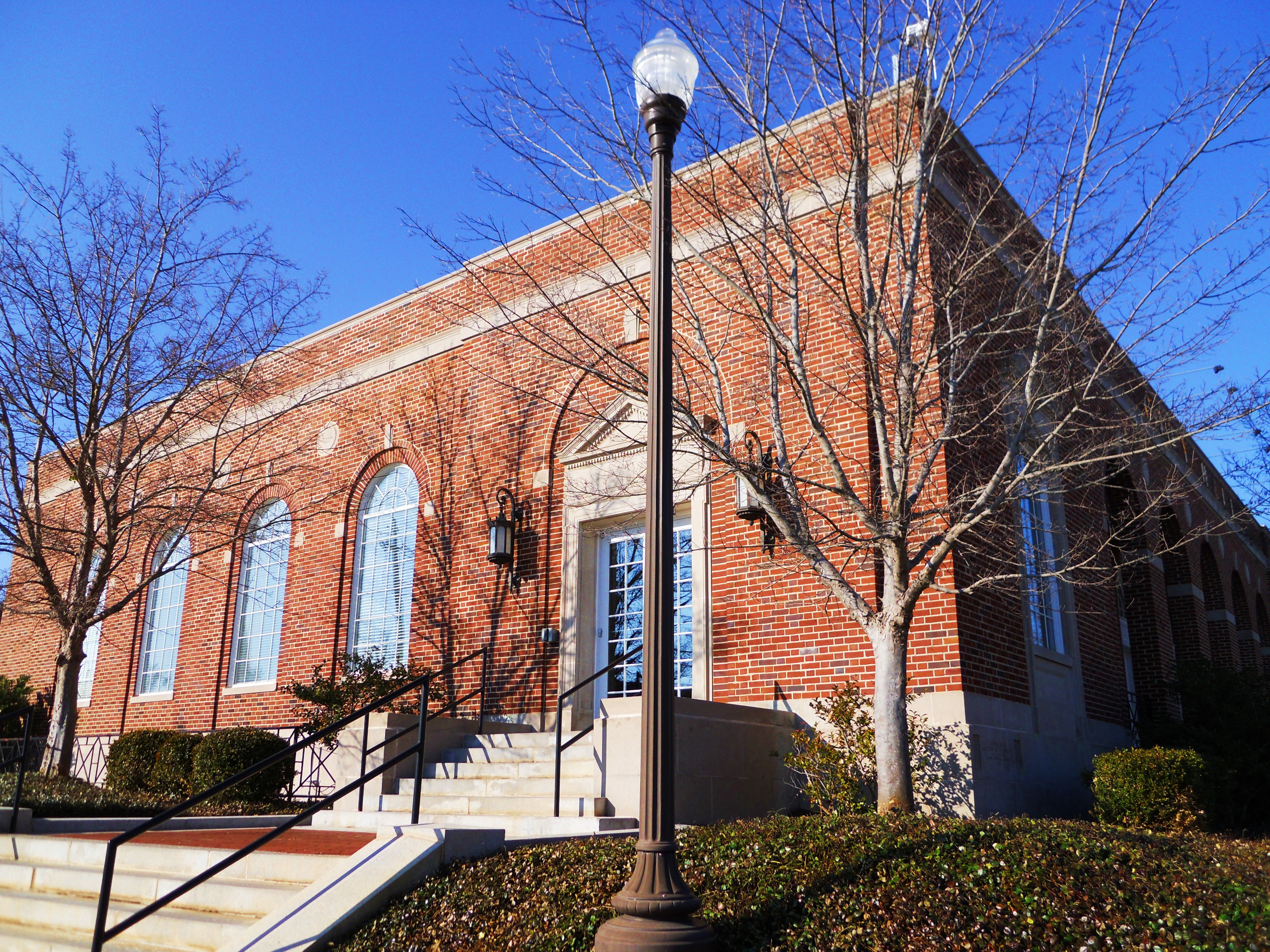
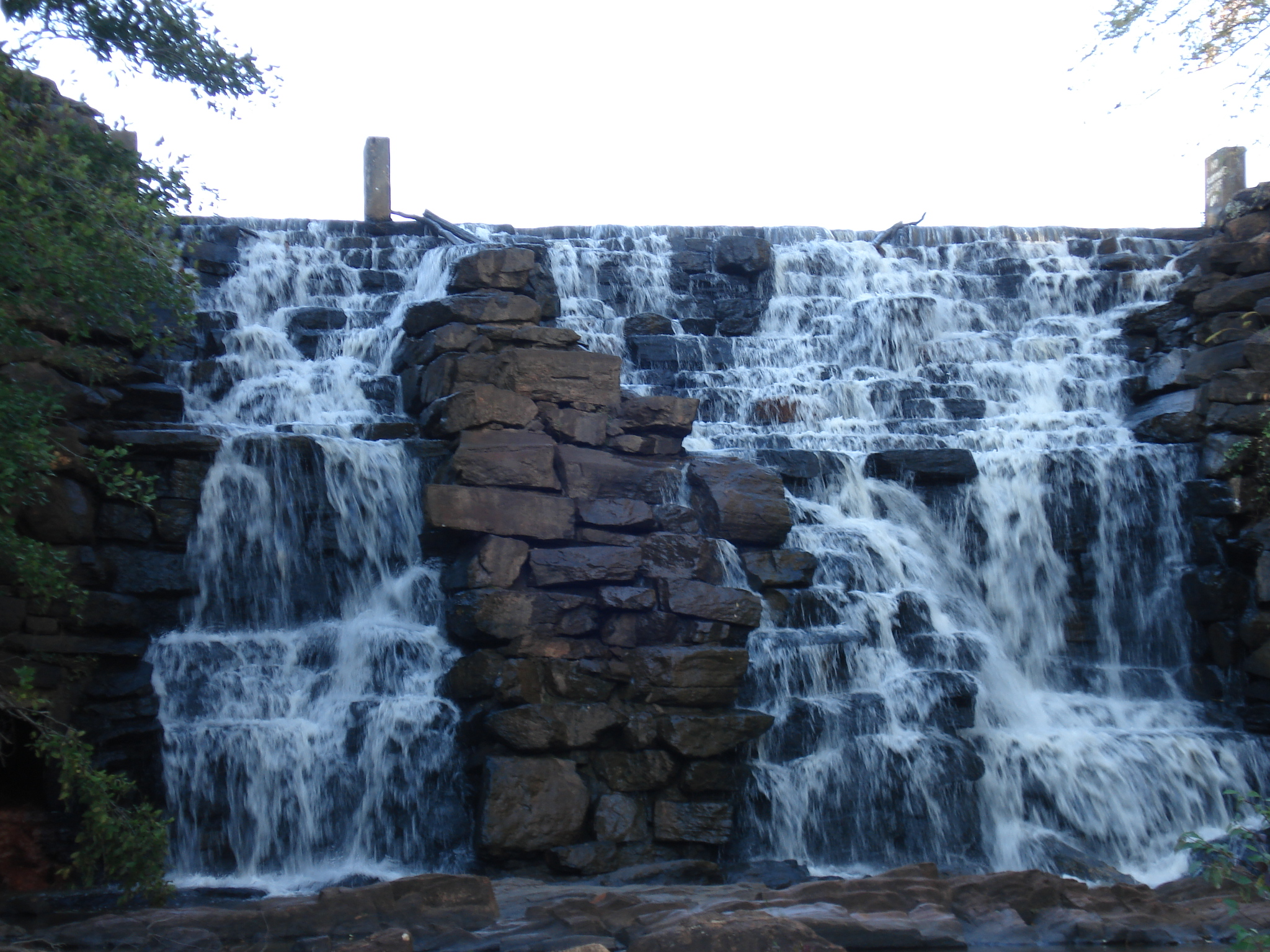
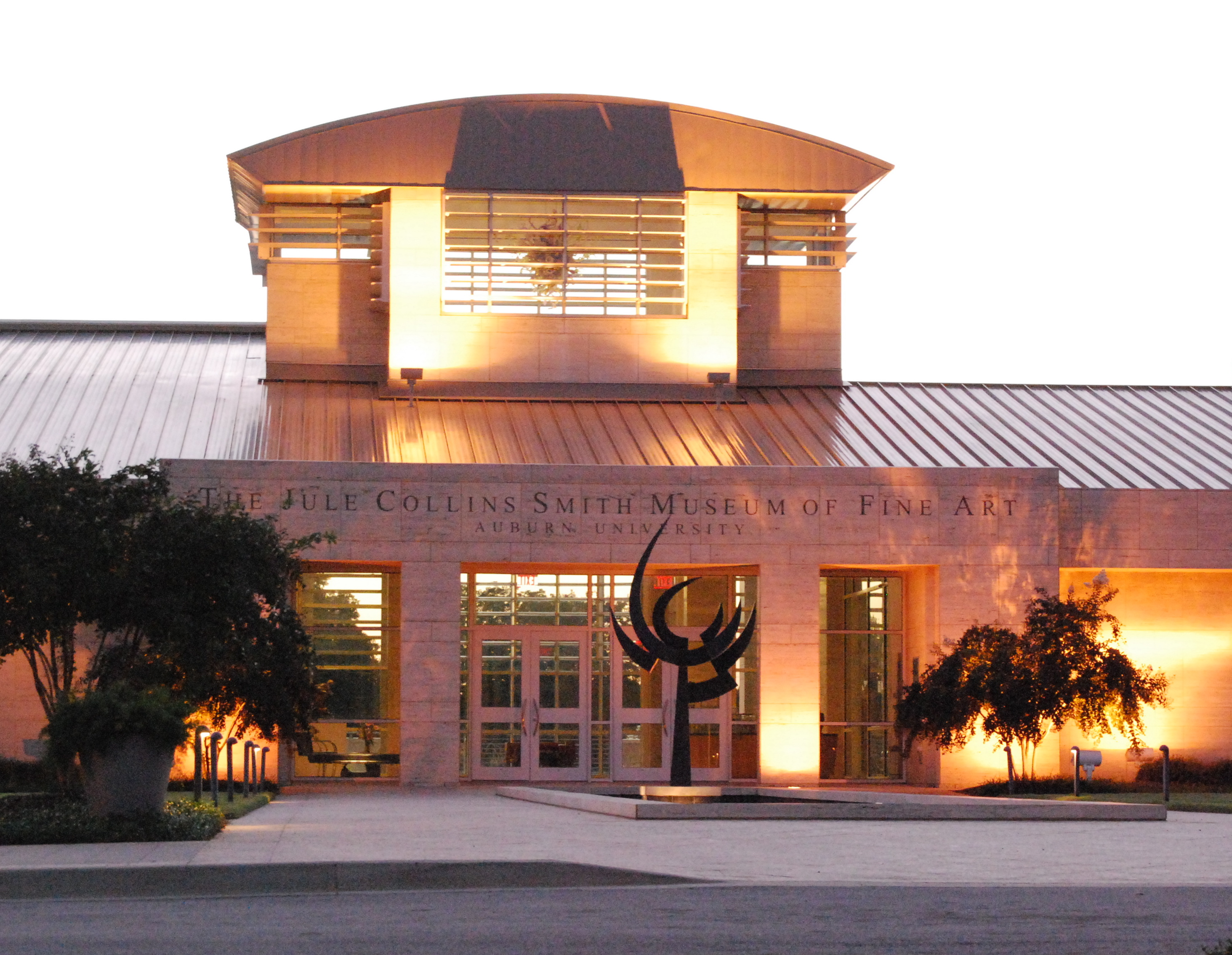
- Auburn University Downtown Auburn Auburn City Hall Chewacla State Park Jule Collins Smith Museum of Fine Art

- Seal
- Motto: "The Loveliest Village On The Plains"
- Interactive map of Auburn, Alabama
- Location within Alabama Location within the United States
- Coordinates: 32°36′30″N 85°30′05″W
- Country: United States
- State: Alabama
- County: Lee
- Founded: 1836
- Incorporated: February 2, 1839

Government
  - Mayor: Ron Anders Jr.

Area
  - City: 62.07 sq mi (160.77 km^{2})
  - Land: 61.04 sq mi (158.09 km^{2})
  - Water: 1.03 sq mi (2.67 km^{2})
- Elevation: 696 ft (212 m)

Population (2020)
  - City: 76,143
  - Estimate (2022): 80,006
  - Rank: US: 449th AL: 7th
  - Density: 1,247.4/sq mi (481.63/km^{2})
  - Urban: 100,842 (US: 310th)
  - Metro: 199,289 (US: 231st)
- Time zone: UTC-6 (Central (CST))
  - Summer (DST): UTC-5 (CDT)
- ZIP codes: 36830–36832, 36849
- Area code: 334
- FIPS code: 01-03076
- GNIS feature ID: 2403132
- Website: auburnal.gov

Auburn is a city in Lee County, Alabama, United States. The population was 76,143 at the 2020 census. It is the largest city in eastern Alabama and is the principal city of the Auburn metropolitan area, which had a population of 193,773 in 2020. It is also included in the greater Columbus–Auburn–Opelika combined statistical area, a region home to 563,967 residents as of 2020.

Auburn is a historic college town and home to Auburn University, the highest academically ranked university in the state. It is Alabama's fastest-growing metropolitan area and the 19th-fastest-growing metro area in the United States as measured since 1990. The city's unofficial nickname is "The Loveliest Village on the Plains", taken from a line in the poem The Deserted Village by Oliver Goldsmith: "Sweet Auburn! Loveliest village of the plain..."

== History ==
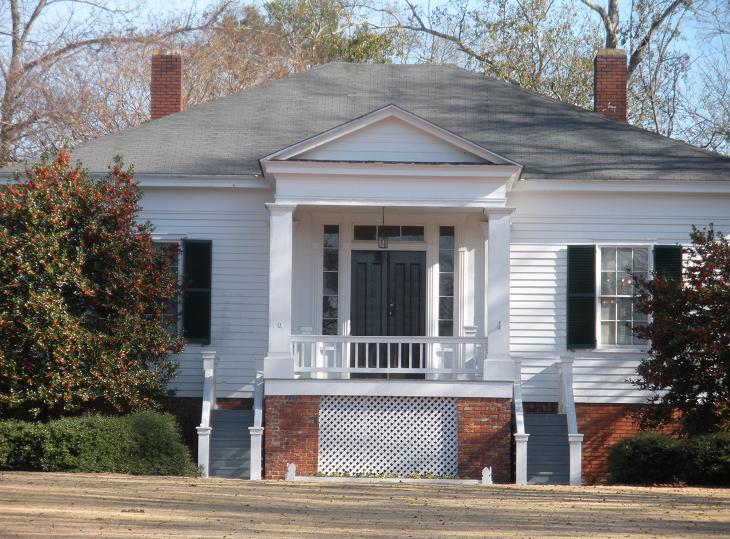
Pebble Hill, also known as the Scott-Yarbrough House, is an antebellum cottage built in 1847 on a plantation and now part of the Auburn University campus.

Inhabited in antiquity by the Creek, the land on which Auburn sits was opened to settlement in 1832 with the Treaty of Cusseta. The first settlers arrived in the winter of 1836 from Harris County, Georgia. These settlers, led by Judge John J. Harper, intended to build a town that would be the religious and educational center for the area. War soon broke out between treaty violators and the Creeks, which led to the Creeks being forcefully moved towards Oklahoma.

Auburn was incorporated on February 2, 1839, in what was then Macon County, covering an area of 2 square miles (5.2 km^{2}). By that time, Methodist and Baptist churches had been established, and a school had been built and had come into operation. In the mid-1840s, separate academies for boys and girls were established in addition to the primary school. This concentration of educational institutions led to a rapid influx of families from the planter class into Auburn in the 1840s and 1850s. By 1858, of the roughly 1,000 free residents of Auburn, some 500 were students.

In 1856, the state legislature chartered a Methodist college, the East Alabama Male College in Auburn. This college, now Auburn University, opened its doors in 1859, offering a classical and liberal education.

With the advent of the Civil War in 1861, Auburn quickly emptied. All of the schools closed, and most businesses shuttered. Auburn was the site of a hospital for Texan Confederate soldiers, but only saw direct combat with the raids of Rousseau in 1864 and Wilson in 1865.

After the Civil War, Auburn's economy entered a prolonged depression that would last the remainder of the century. Public schools did not reopen until the mid-1870s, and most businesses remained closed. A series of fires in the 1860s and 1870s gutted the downtown area. East Alabama Male College was turned over to the state in 1872, and with funds from the federal Morrill Act was renamed Alabama Agricultural and Mechanical College with a new mission as a land grant college. Passage of the Hatch Act in 1887 allowed for expansion of agricultural research facilities on campus.

In 1892, the college became the first four-year college in Alabama to admit women. This, combined with increased interest in scientific agriculture and engineering and new funding from business licenses, allowed the city to start expanding again. By 1910, Auburn's population had returned to its antebellum level. SIAA championships won by the football team of what was then officially Alabama Polytechnic Institute, but often called "Auburn" for short, brought attention and support to Auburn, and helped fill the city's coffers.

Fortunes were quickly reversed with the collapse of cotton prices in the early 1920s and the subsequent Great Depression a decade later. Due to these events, the state government became unable to fund the college. With Auburn's economy completely derived from the college, residents were forced into a barter economy to support themselves.

Money began to flow into Auburn again with America's entry into World War II. Auburn's campus was turned into a training ground for technical specialists in the armed forces. After the war, Auburn was flooded by soldiers returning to school on the G.I. Bill.

Primarily due to this influx of students, Auburn began a period of growth that lasted through the 1950s and 1960s. A considerable amount of residential and business construction pushed Auburn's growth outside of the original boundaries of the city, leading to a series of large annexations which expanded Auburn to nearly 24 square miles (62 km^{2}). Construction of Interstate 85 beginning in 1957 connected Auburn to the major cities of the state. This allowed for Auburn University (as it was renamed in 1960) to move more home football games to Auburn after years of playing "home" games in larger cities, creating a strong tourism component in Auburn's economy. Auburn Mall opened as "Village Mall" in 1973.

Growth slowed somewhat in the 1970s, and a se ries of budget cuts made it clear that Auburn's sole economic reliance on Auburn University put the city in a tenuous position. Backlash against what was seen as an ineffectual city council led to the election of Jan Dempsey as mayor in 1980 and the removal of the previous city government system in favor of a council-manager system. With a new government in place, the city began aggressively pursuing industry, leading to a nearly 1,200% increase in the number of industrial jobs over the next twenty years. As public satisfaction with the city administration reached record levels, Auburn began very rapid residential growth.

A series of reports in the 1980s and 1990s ranking the Auburn public school system among the top in the state and nation convinced thousands of new residents to move to Auburn over the past 25 years. Between 1980 and 2003, Auburn's population grew by 65%, and Auburn's economy expanded by 220%.

The population growth has only accelerated into the 21st century, both organically within the city and through annexation and incorporation of surrounding portions of Lee County. Auburn's population has grown over 77% from 2000 to the latest 2020 decennial census figures. With the continued rapid growth comes issues of urban sprawl and expansions to infrastructure, which have become two of Auburn's primary political issues.

== Geography ==
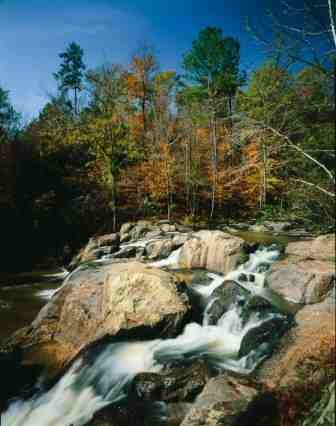
A creek flowing through Chewacla State Park in Auburn

The city of Auburn lies in western Lee County and is bordered by the city of Opelika to the northeast and by Chambers County to the north. The city stretches south to the Macon County line in the southwest.

Auburn sits on the Fall Line at the juncture of the Piedmont plateau and the coastal plain. Portions of Auburn also include the southernmost exposure of rocks indicating the Appalachian orogeny—as such, the last foothill of the Appalachian Mountains lies in Chewacla State Park in southern Auburn. As a result of these three varied physical environments, Auburn has an extremely diverse geology.

The southwest and west regions of the city on the plateau are marked by rolling plains and savannahs, with the undeveloped portion primarily being used for cattle grazing and ranching. South of this region sits the coastal plain, with sandy soil and pine forest. Parts of north Auburn have much more rugged topographies, with thick forests in high hills and deep hollows of the type common to parts of eastern Tennessee. The region surrounded by Chewacla Park in the south of the city contains sharp peaks and sudden drops of elevation as the 1.05 billion-year-old rock of the Appalachians meets the coastal plain.

Auburn sits near the divide between the Chattahoochee and Tallapoosa River watersheds, though the vast majority of the city resides in the latter. Auburn is drained by three main creek systems: in the south, by the Chewacla/Opintlocco Creek system; in the north, by the Saugahatchee Creek system; and in the extreme northern reaches of Auburn by Sandy Creek. The dividing line between the Chewacla and Saugahatchee watersheds roughly follows railroad line east–west through the center of town.

According to the United States Census Bureau in 2000, the city has a total area of 39.6 square miles (103 km^{2}), of which, 39.1 square miles (101 km^{2}) of it is land and 0.4 square miles (1.0 km^{2}) of it (1.11%) is water. The elevation of Auburn at City Hall is 709 ft (216 m) above sea level; though due to Auburn's diverse topography, elevation ranges from 386 ft (118 m) above sea level where Chewacla Creek crosses Sand Hill Road to 845 ft (258 m) above sea level in northern Auburn near the Chambers County line.

=== Climate ===
Typical of the Deep South, Auburn has a humid subtropical climate (Köppen Cfa), marked by mild winters, early springs, long, hot, muggy summers, and warm autumns. Due to its position near the Gulf of Mexico, the city receives a significant amount of rainfall—on average, 52.6 inches (1,340 mm) per year—though there is a distinct dry season in the late summer and early fall. Severe storm activity – thunderstorms producing damaging winds or large hail – is common from the late winter through early summer. There is the risk of tornadoes. Owing to its proximity to the Gulf, Auburn is also subject to fringe effects from tropical storms and hurricanes in the summer and fall. Hurricanes Opal in 1995 and Ivan in 2004 are among two of the most notable tropical systems to affect the Auburn area in recent memory, bringing torrential rains and high winds.

Winters are typically mild, with an average 0.7 inches (1.8 cm) of snowfall, though more than three-fourths of all seasons do not have any measurable snow. Most days have 50 °F (10 °C)+ highs, and from December to February, an average total of 10–11 days of 70 °F (21 °C)+ highs, while it rarely stays below freezing all day. However, the city straddles the border between USDA Plant Hardiness Zones 7B and 8A, and there are an average of 5.6 nights with sub-20 °F (−7 °C) lows. On the other end, summers are long, hot, and humid, with 57 days of 90 °F (32 °C)+ highs. Although the actual air temperature reaching 100 °F (38 °C) is uncommon (1.2 days annually), high humidity can push daytime heat indices over that mark.

Climate data for Auburn, Alabama (Auburn University)
Month	Jan	Feb	Mar	Apr	May	Jun	Jul	Aug	Sep	Oct	Nov	Dec	Year
Mean daily maximum °F (°C)	56.1 (13.4)	60.4 (15.8)	67.9 (19.9)	74.6 (23.7)	82.6 (28.1)	88.3 (31.3)	90.8 (32.7)	89.8 (32.1)	85.7 (29.8)	76.8 (24.9)	67.8 (19.9)	58.2 (14.6)	75.0 (23.9)
Mean daily minimum °F (°C)	33.8 (1.0)	37.3 (2.9)	44.2 (6.8)	51.3 (10.7)	60.2 (15.7)	67.0 (19.4)	70.3 (21.3)	70.5 (21.4)	64.6 (18.1)	54.8 (12.7)	45.0 (7.2)	36.3 (2.4)	53.0 (11.7)
Average precipitation inches (mm)	4.54 (115)	4.36 (111)	5.85 (149)	3.84 (98)	3.25 (83)	4.61 (117)	6.09 (155)	3.22 (82)	4.44 (113)	3.19 (81)	4.28 (109)	4.88 (124)	52.55 (1,337)
Average precipitation days (≥ 0.01 in)	10.8	9.7	9.5	8.6	8.3	10.1	12.8	10.2	8.0	6.8	8.5	9.7	113.0
Source: NOAA

== Demographics ==
Historical population
Census	Pop.	Note	%±
1870	1,018		—
1880	1,161		14.0%
1890	1,440		24.0%
1900	1,447		0.5%
1910	1,408		−2.7%
1920	2,143		52.2%
1930	2,800		30.7%
1940	4,652		66.1%
1950	12,939		178.1%
1960	16,261		25.7%
1970	22,767		40.0%
1980	28,471		25.1%
1990	33,830		18.8%
2000	42,987		27.1%
2010	53,380		24.2%
2020	76,143		42.6%
2023 (est.)	82,025	▲	7.7%
U.S. Decennial Census; 2020 Census

Auburn first appeared on the 1870 U.S. Census as an incorporated town.

=== Racial and ethnic composition ===
Auburn city, Alabama – Racial and ethnic composition Note: the US Census treats Hispanic/Latino as an ethnic category. This table excludes Latinos from the racial categories and assigns them to a separate category. Hispanics/Latinos may be of any race.
Race / Ethnicity (NH = Non-Hispanic)	Pop 1980	Pop 1990	Pop 2000	Pop 2010	Pop 2020	% 1980	% 1990	% 2000	% 2010	% 2020
White alone (NH)	23,284	26,803	33,188	39,255	48,132	81.78%	79.23%	77.20%	73.54%	63.21%
Black or African American alone (NH)	4,584	5,521	7,183	8,772	13,924	16.10%	16.32%	16.71%	16.43%	18.29%
Native American or Alaska Native alone (NH)	23	58	73	143	128	0.08%	0.17%	0.17%	0.27%	0.17%
Asian alone (NH)	318	1,123	1,418	2,817	7,397	1.12%	3.32%	3.30%	5.28%	9.71%
Native Hawaiian or Pacific Islander alone (NH)	x	x	13	12	31	x	x	0.03%	0.02%	0.04%
Other race alone (NH)	0	11	33	89	206	0.00%	0.03%	0.08%	0.17%	0.27%
Mixed race or Multiracial (NH)	x	x	413	741	2,706	x	x	0.96%	1.39%	3.55%
Hispanic or Latino (any race)	232	314	666	1,551	3,619	0.81%	0.93%	1.55%	2.91%	4.75%
Total	28,471	33,830	42,987	53,380	76,143	100.00%	100.00%	100.00%	100.00%	100.00%

=== Census divisions ===
Historical population
Census	Pop.	Note	%±
1870	3,822		—
1880	2,951		−22.8%
1890	3,001		1.7%
1900	3,615		20.5%
1910	3,381		−6.5%
1920	3,840		13.6%
1930	5,177		34.8%
1940	8,297		60.3%
1950	15,882		91.4%
1960	16,261		2.4%
1970	22,767		40.0%
1980	55,511		143.8%
1990	60,814		9.6%
2000	71,027		16.8%
2010	80,779		13.7%
2020	103,453		28.1%
U.S. Decennial Census

The Auburn Beat (Lee County 2nd Beat) first appeared on the 1870 U.S. Census. In 1890, "beat" was changed to "precinct". In 1870, 1930 and 1940 when racial demographics were reported, it showed a Black majority. In 1960, the precinct was changed to "census division" as part of a general reorganization of counties. The city boundaries and that of the census division were contiguous by that census. In 1980, the census divisions of Auburn and Opelika, along with parts of Loachapoka-Roxana, Opelika Rural-Pepperell were consolidated into the new division of Auburn-Opelika.

=== 2020 census ===
As of the 2020 census, Auburn had a population of 76,143. The median age was 24.6 years. 19.4% of residents were under the age of 18 and 8.9% of residents were 65 years of age or older. For every 100 females there were 97.0 males, and for every 100 females age 18 and over there were 94.5 males age 18 and over.

95.1% of residents lived in urban areas, while 4.9% lived in rural areas.

There were 30,233 households in Auburn, of which 26.7% had children under the age of 18 living in them. Of all households, 35.7% were married-couple households, 28.4% were households with a male householder and no spouse or partner present, and 31.9% were households with a female householder and no spouse or partner present. About 32.1% of all households were made up of individuals and 5.6% had someone living alone who was 65 years of age or older.

There were 33,209 housing units, of which 9.0% were vacant. The homeowner vacancy rate was 2.0% and the rental vacancy rate was 6.0%.

=== 2010 census ===
As of the census of 2010, there were 53,380 people, 22,111 households, and 9,939 families residing in the city. The population density was 919.3 inhabitants per square mile (354.9/km^{2}). There were 20,043 housing units at an average density of 512.2 per square mile (197.8/km^{2}). The racial makeup of the city was 75.1% White, 16.5% Black or African American, 0.3% Native American, 5.3% Asian, 0.00% Pacific Islander, 1.10% from other races, and 1.6% from two or more races. 2.9% of the population were Hispanic or Latino of any race.

There were 22,111 households, out of which 22.1% had children under the age of 18 living with them, 32.4% were married couples living together, 8.8% had a female householder with no husband present, and 55.2% were non-families. 33.8% of all households were made up of individuals, and 11.5% had someone living alone who was 65 years of age or older. The average household size was 2.24 and the average family size was 2.99.

In the city, the population was spread out, with 17.5% under the age of 18, 38.0% from 18 to 24, 23.1% from 25 to 44, 14.6% from 45 to 64, and 6.9% who were 65 years of age or older. The median age was 23.3 years. For every 100 females, there were 100.3 males. For every 100 females age 18 and over, there were 102.4 males.

The median income for a household in the city was $35,857, and the median income for a family was $72,771. Males had a median income of $51,644 versus $36,898 for females. The per capita income for the city was $24,656. About 9.2% of families and 25.2% of the population were below the poverty line, including 15.0% of those under age 18 and 3.6% of those age 65 or over. The reason for this enormous inequality between households and families is due to the large number of students living in the area.

== Economy ==
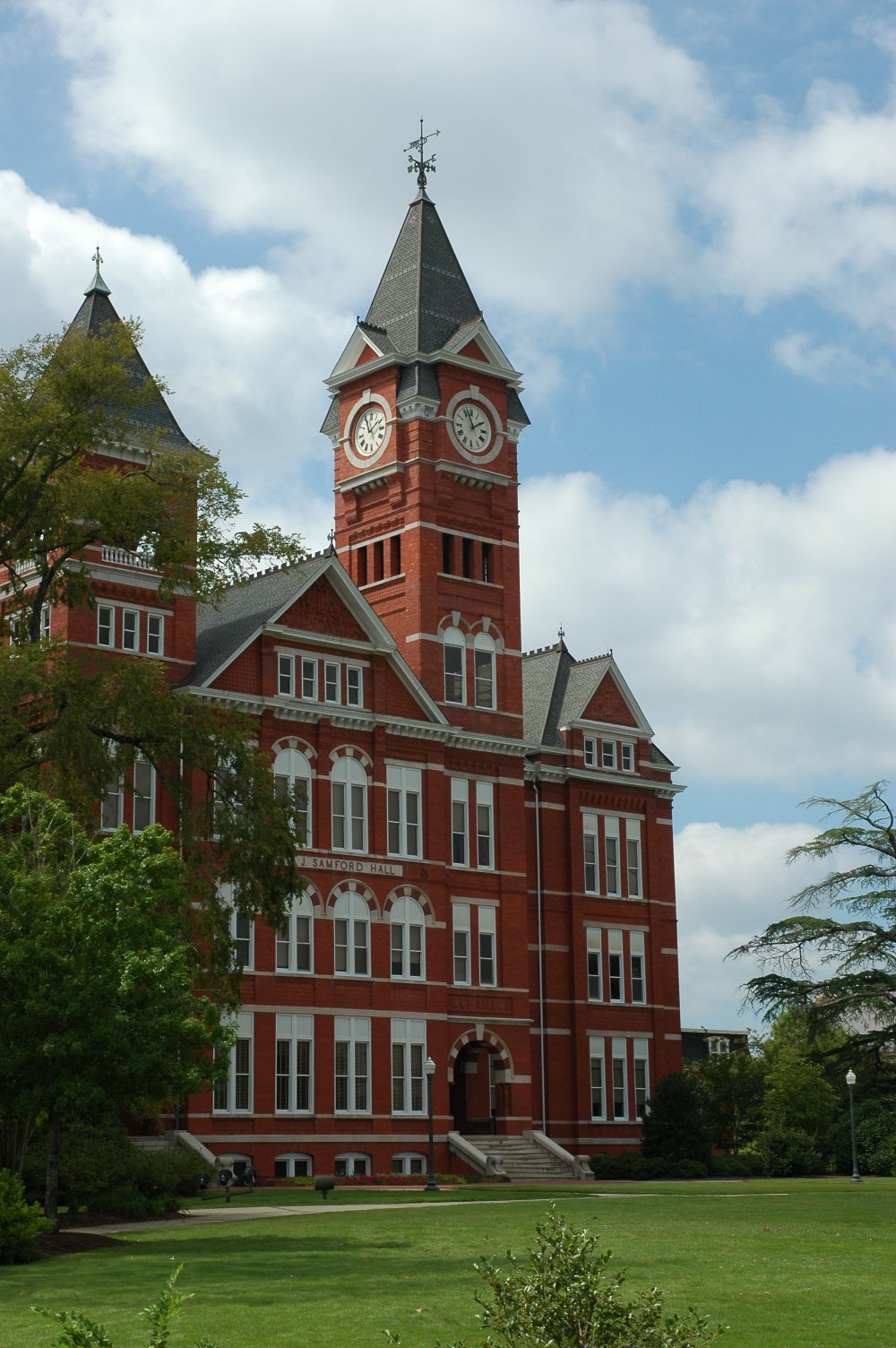
Samford Hall on the Auburn University campus

Auburn's economy is centered on Auburn University and providing university-affiliated services. Auburn University employs 13,545 people as of 2024. The Auburn-Opelika area has a 3.1 unemployment rate as of February 2025.

Auburn's industrial base is built around mid-sized, high tech manufacturing and research firms. Auburn has one industrial park and four technology parks where main areas of industrial focus are on the manufacture of small engines, automotive wheels, fuel cells, plastic injection technology, and vehicle armor. The 156-acre (0.63 km^{2}) Auburn Research Park opened in September 2008 and will be anchored by a firm which specializes in research in high-resolution, dark field optical microscopy. The Research Park includes several buildings housing research in many different specialties, including the MRI Research Center which features both a 3 tesla and a 7 tesla MRI scanner. Overall, the manufacturing sector accounts for some 5,000 jobs in Auburn.

Auburn is located between the Kia and Hyundai automobile manufacturing facilities with the Kia Motors manufacturing plant about 35 miles (56 km) east on I-85 and the Hyundai Motors manufacturing plant about 55 miles (89 km) west on I-85/I-65.

== Arts and culture ==
The Jule Collins Smith Museum of Fine Art

The Jule Collins Smith Museum of Fine Art maintains a collection of primarily 19th- and 20th-century American and European art. The museum's exhibits include works by Jacob Lawrence, Ben Shahn, and Georgia O'Keeffe, John James Audubon, Salvador Dalí, Marc Chagall, Renoir, Picasso, and Matisse. Sculptures include a collection of Tibetan bronzes.

The Jay and Susie Gogue Performing Arts Center hosts musical theatre, dance, and concerts. The 80,000 square foot building can hold up to 1,200 guests in the main performance venue, and the outdoor amphitheater has a capacity of 4,000.

The Telfair Peet Theatre performs a series of plays and musicals each year.

== Sports ==
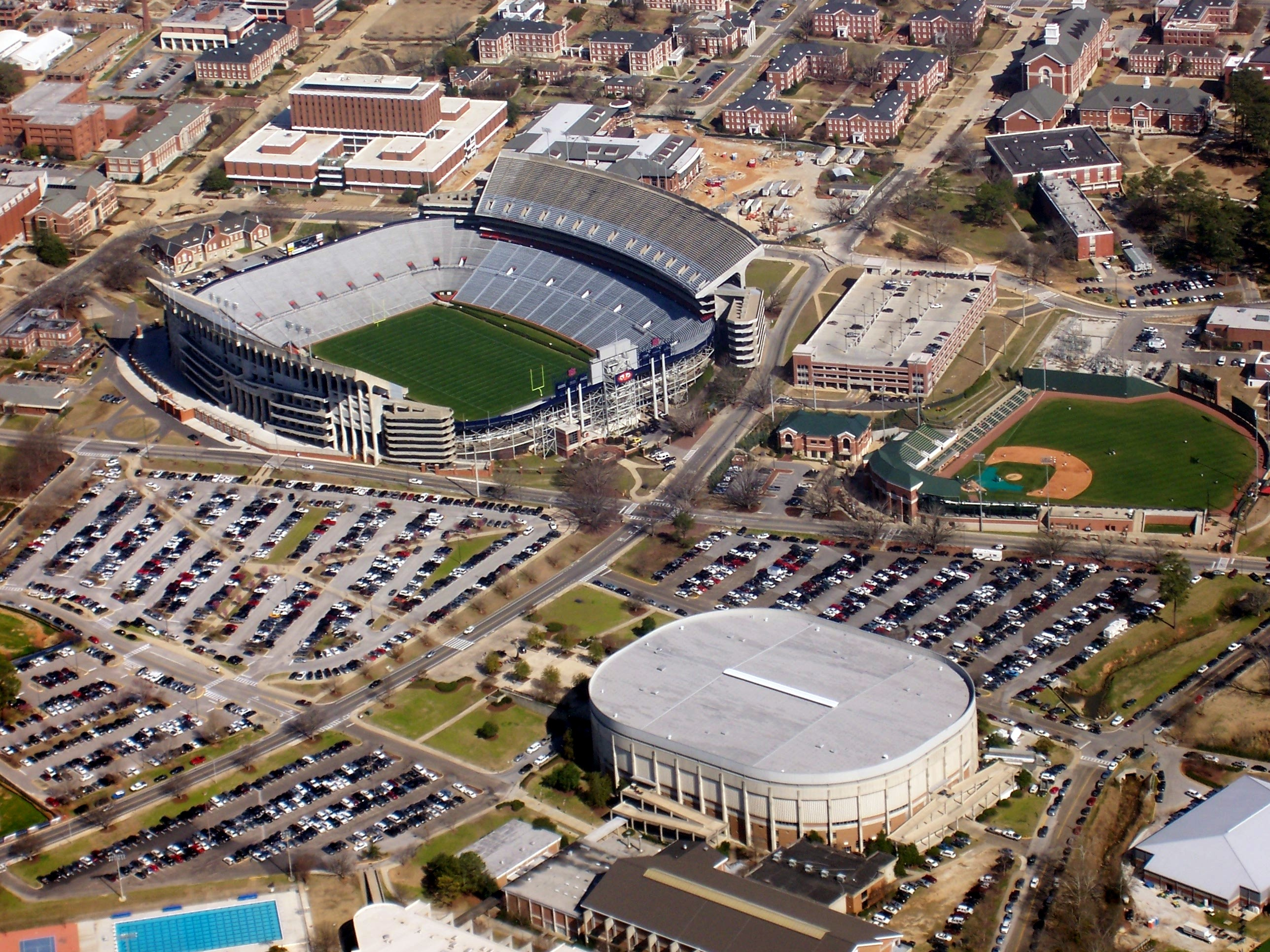
Jordan-Hare Stadium (top left), Beard-Eaves-Memorial Coliseum (bottom), and Samford Stadium-Hitchcock Field at Plainsman Park (top right)

Auburn has no professional sports teams, but nonetheless has a vibrant sports culture due to the presence of Auburn University's NCAA Division I athletic squads. Auburn University football in particular is a major force in Auburn's culture and economy. When Auburn University has home football games in the fall, the city often sees over 100,000 visitors, and the yearly economic impact is measured at nearly $100 million. While other sports do not attract as many tourists to Auburn, the university's 17 varsity sports offer citizens a variety of other opportunities for viewing competition.

Home football games particularly change the face of Auburn for several weekends a year. Tens of thousands of fans flood the campus hours—sometimes days—before the game to tailgate, creating a festival-like atmosphere throughout the weekend. Football games in Auburn are played in 87,451 seat Jordan–Hare Stadium, which sits on the main campus, just a few blocks from downtown.

Basketball is played at 9,121-seat Neville Arena, while baseball games are held at 6,300-seat Plainsman Park. Another one of Auburn's most competitive sports is the swimming program, which has won seven of the last nine NCAA national championships including the last five straight and 11 consecutive SEC men's championships. Also, the women's program have won five NCAA national titles and four SEC championships. The teams compete at the James E. Martin Aquatics Center. More Olympic swimmers have come from Auburn's swimming program than any other university swimming program.

The Auburn Metro Area is home to 146 holes of golf at six courses, and has played host to several professional and amateur golf tournaments. Auburn Links was rated as one of the top three new courses in the nation when it opened in 1996, and the Robert Trent Jones-designed Grand National course in the Auburn metro is often cited as one of the top public courses in the nation. Because of this, in 2005, the Auburn Metro Area was ranked number 1 in the United States for golf by Golf Digest.

== Parks and recreation ==
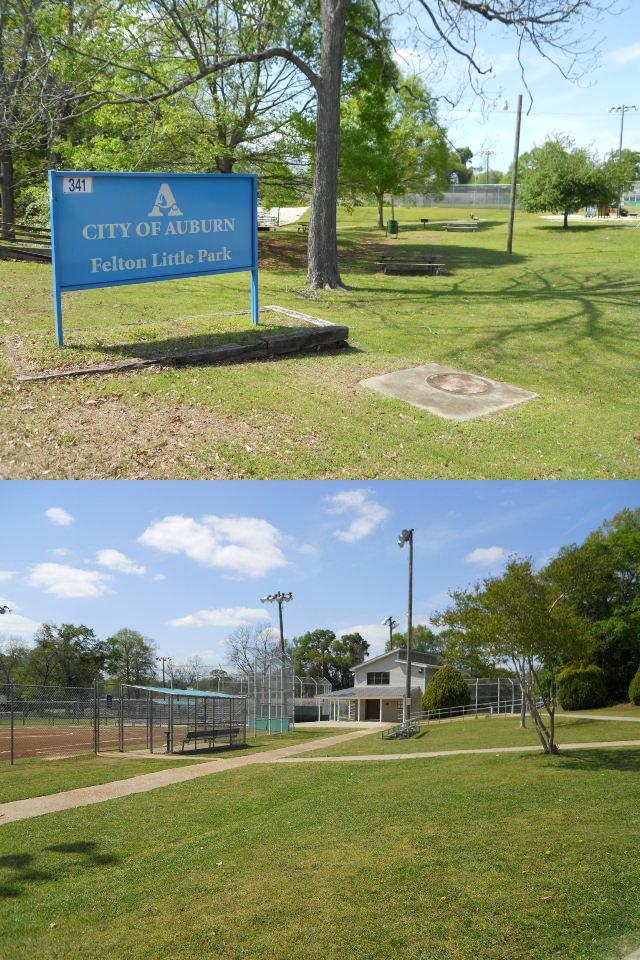
Felton Little Park

Recreational opportunities in Auburn include 16 parks, highlighted by Chewacla State Park, a 700-acre (2.8 km^{2}) park in the Appalachian foothills, Kiesel Park, a 200-acre (0.81 km^{2}) "passive" park with numerous trails, and the Louise Kreher Forest Ecology Preserve. The Donald E. Davis Arboretum showcases 150 different tree species native to Alabama and the Southeast. Auburn is also ringed by miles of multi-use trails and several lakes.

== Law and government ==
Auburn has a council-manager government led by an eight-member city council, a mayor, and an appointed city manager. The city council acts as a legislative body of the city, passing laws and regulations and appointing citizens to the city's various boards, including the Auburn City Board of Education. Each member of the city council is elected for a four-year term from one of eight geographic wards.

The mayor of Auburn is elected in the city at-large to a four-year term. The duties of the mayor are, per State Code: 1) ceremonial, 2) to serve as the Governor's contact in the event of an emergency and 3) to conduct Council meetings, and to be the tie breaking vote for the city council legislative body. The Mayor has no administrative duties, as the City Manager serves as the CEO. As such, the position of mayor in Auburn is primarily symbolic. The current mayor of Auburn is Ron Anders, elected in 2018 and re-elected in 2022.

The day-to-day operations of Auburn are run by the City Manager. The City Manager is appointed by and serves at the leisure of the City Council. The City Manager is responsible for the appointment and dismissal of all department heads, advises the council on policy matters, and creates and administers the city budget. The current City Manager of Auburn is Megan McGowen Crouch.

The United States Postal Service operates a post office at 300 Opelika Road, Auburn, Alabama.

== Education ==
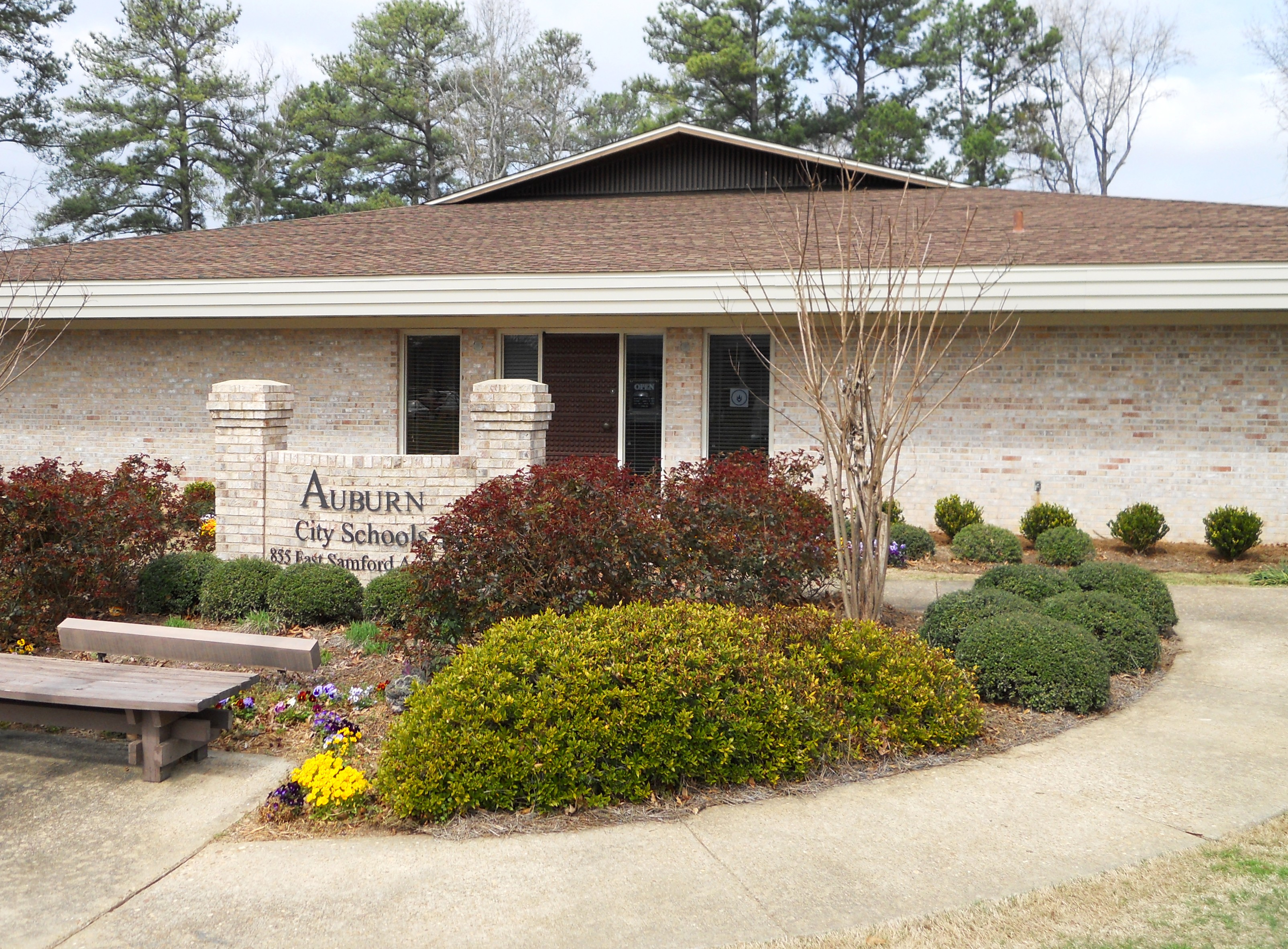
Auburn City Schools headquarters

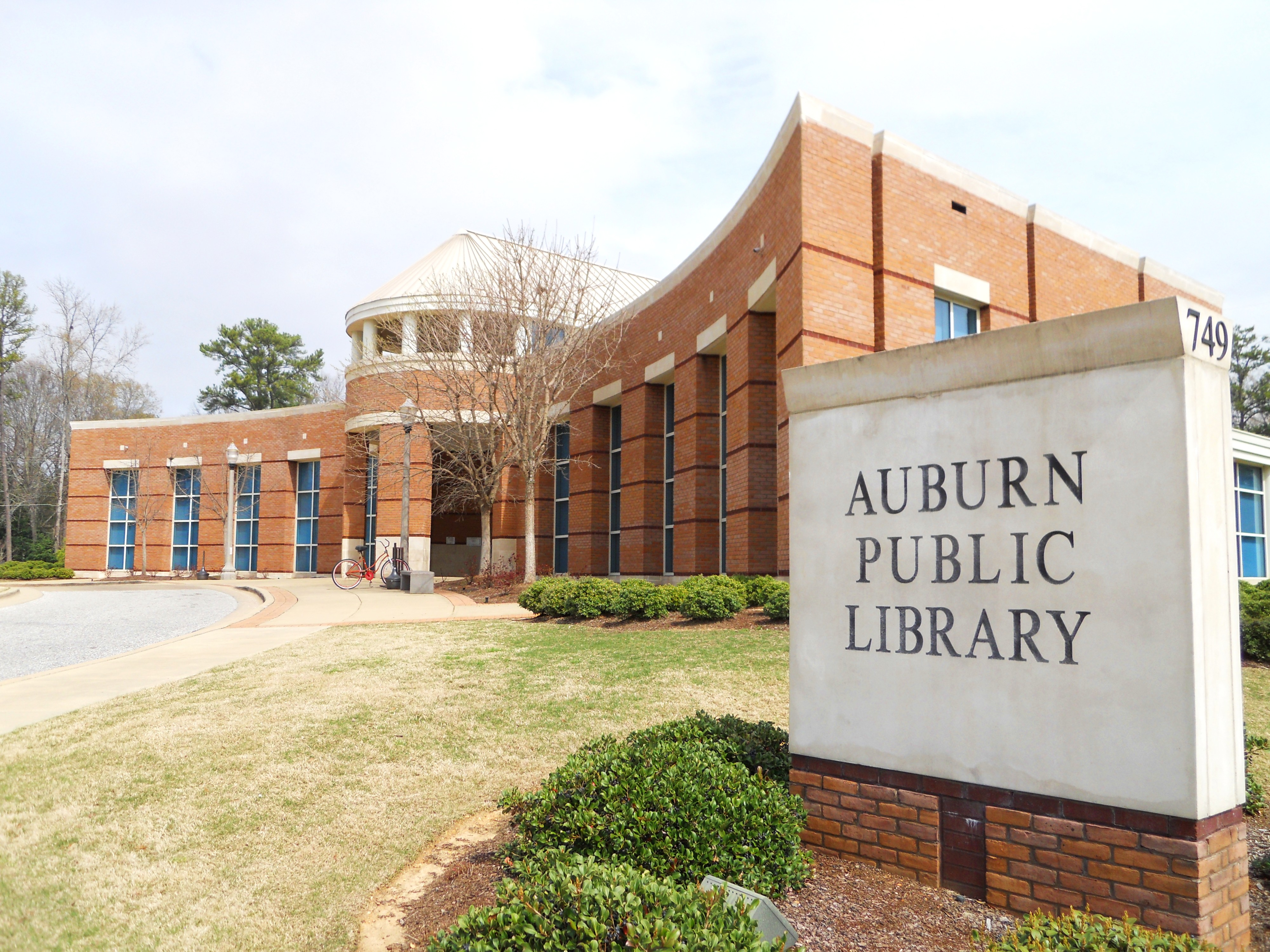
Auburn Public Library

Auburn, as a college town, is largely driven by the influence of education. Auburn has one post-secondary school, Auburn University, which has an enrollment of 31,526 as of 2021–2022. Auburn University is a land-grant university and a sea and space grant university with traditionally strong programs in business, engineering, agriculture, and veterinary medicine. The university is largely focused on undergraduate education, with a graduate program of 5,000. Auburn University is a research institution, with primary areas of research focus including wireless engineering, molecular biosciences, transportation, aquaculture, and forest sustainability. Auburn is also home to several research centers, including the Ludwig von Mises Institute.

Auburn's public school system, Auburn City Schools, has 14 campuses with over 9,400 students. This includes ten elementary schools, two middle schools, one junior high school, and one high school with a second planned for opening in August 2028. Auburn's school system has repeatedly been ranked among the top public school systems in the state and nation. Auburn City Schools has been ranked among the top 100 school districts in the United States by Parenting magazine and as the best educational value in the Southeast by The Wall Street Journal. Auburn's Early Education Center has specialized programs for autism education, has been recognized as a national Blue Ribbon school, and is an Intel and Scholastic School of Distinction. Wrights Mill Road Elementary School was recognized as a national Blue Ribbon school in 2009, while Auburn Junior High School is recognized nationally for its 21st Century Laptop Learning Initiative, which places laptops in the hands of students in grades 8 and 9. Auburn High School has strong International Baccalaureate, widely offered Advanced Placement, and renowned music programs, and was ranked in 2006 by Newsweek as the top non-magnet public high school in Alabama, and one of the top 30 in the United States. Auburn has the Auburn Public Library.

The Auburn City Schools public school system is currently served by one high school for the entire city, a 350,000 square-foot, $72 million facility that opened in 2017 and houses students in 10th through 12th grade. As of the 2021–22 school year, the student population at Auburn High is the most of any high school in the state of Alabama. After the completion of the new high school facility, the old Auburn High School site was converted into a Junior High School, serving students in 8th and 9th grade. The old Auburn Junior High School became East Samford School, a 7th grade school, while Drake Middle School hosts all 6th graders in the city school system. Elementary school zones are in pairs throughout the city; one school in the zone houses kindergarten through 2nd grade, while the other school serves grades 3 through 5.

== Media ==
Auburn is served by the Columbus, Georgia Television Designated Market Area (DMA). Some Montgomery, Alabama stations are carried on cable systems and WSFA is designated by the FCC as a significantly viewed station for the area. Charter Communications and W.O.W. (Wide Open West) provide cable television service. DirecTV and Dish Network provide direct broadcast satellite television including both local and national channels. The On-Campus television station, Eagle Eye TV, is broadcast twenty-four hours a day for residents living on-campus and the immediate surrounding areas.

Radio stations WEGL and WAUD are licensed to Auburn and broadcast from the city. Radio station WKKR is licensed to Auburn and broadcasts from nearby Opelika.

Newspapers serving the city include The Opelika-Auburn News, The Auburn Villager, and The Auburn Plainsman.

== Infrastructure ==
=== Transportation ===
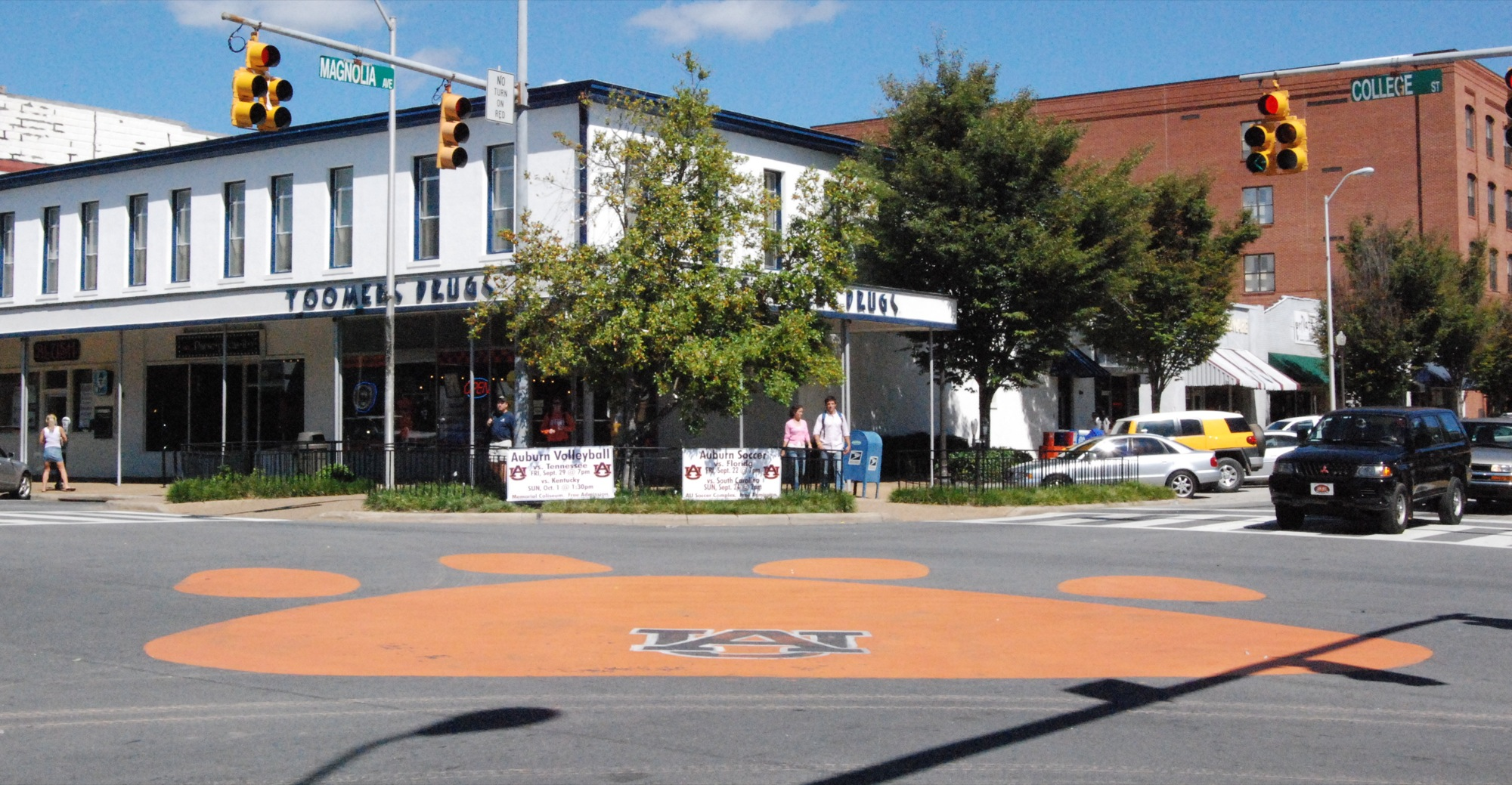
Toomer's Corner in downtown Auburn

Auburn is located in the southeastern part of Alabama and is accessible by Interstate 85, US 29, and US 280. The city also has a general aviation airport, the Auburn University Regional Airport (AUO) (formerly Auburn-Opelika Robert G. Pitts Airport), which is 2 miles (3.2 km) east of downtown Auburn. The major commercial airports closest to Auburn are the Hartsfield–Jackson Atlanta International Airport (ATL) (Atlanta) and the Birmingham–Shuttlesworth International Airport (BHM) (Birmingham). Each of these airports is within 2 hours driving distance from Auburn and together they offer air service to most of the world's major airports. There are also two regional airports close to Auburn: Montgomery Regional Airport (MGM) (Montgomery) and Columbus Airport (CSG) (Columbus). Until 1971, neighboring Opelika saw daily passenger train service on the City of Miami.

There is daily ground transportation between Auburn and the Atlanta airport. Tiger Taxi, Eagle Town Taxi, Spirit Town Taxi all provide both local taxi service and flat-rate transportation service to other cities. Auburn University provides the Tiger Transit bus system, which runs near the campus and to area apartment complexes part of the year. Lee-Russell Public Transit (LRPT) offers Dial-A-Ride services in Lee and Russell counties. Hail-a-ride apps available: Gata Hub.

There are few sidewalks and no city bus system in Auburn. It is a heavily car-dependent community. It has received an award for being a bike friendly town from the League of American Bicyclists. The Auburn Bike Committee posts a list of bike rides and events.

=== Public safety ===
The Public Safety Department has five divisions: Police, Fire, Communications, Codes Enforcement, and Administration. The department provides all law enforcement, public safety services, and emergency 911 response and dispatch services for the City of Auburn and the campus of Auburn University. Construction activities in the city are monitored and inspected by the Codes Enforcement Division. Ambulance services are provided via a contract with East Alabama Medical Center.

=== Utilities ===
The Water Works Board of Auburn provides water and sewer services to residents. Electricity is provided by Alabama Power. Auburn Environmental Services handles picking up trash and recycling. Depending on the location of the city, internet access is available from WOW! Internet, Spectrum, and AT&T Internet.

== Notable people ==
Auburn has had many notable citizens in its 170-year history, including Nobel Prize winners such as Frederick C. Robbins and George F. Smoot, world-class architects including Paul Rudolph and Samuel "Sambo" Mockbee, artists, governors, generals and admirals, and professional athletes. Robert Gibbs, the 28th White House Press Secretary and the first Press Secretary for President Barack Obama, is a graduate of Auburn High School.

== Sister cities ==
Since 1998, Blagoevgrad, Bulgaria has been a sister city of Auburn. In 2014, Auburn, Alabama and Auburn, New York became sister cities to celebrate January 6, 2014 "Auburn Tigers Day" in honor of the Auburn Tigers playing in the 2014 BCS National Championship Game.

== See also ==
- Kinnucan's
- Guthrie's
