= History of TBS (American TV channel) =

The American cable channel TBS originated as the superstation feed of what is now WPCH-TV (channel 17), a UHF television station in Atlanta, Georgia, United States. Known as WTCG when uplinked to satellite in 1976 and renamed WTBS in 1979, the feed was converted to a basic cable channel in 1998, with the local Atlanta station being spun off in 2007.

== Prehistory as an Atlanta UHF station ==
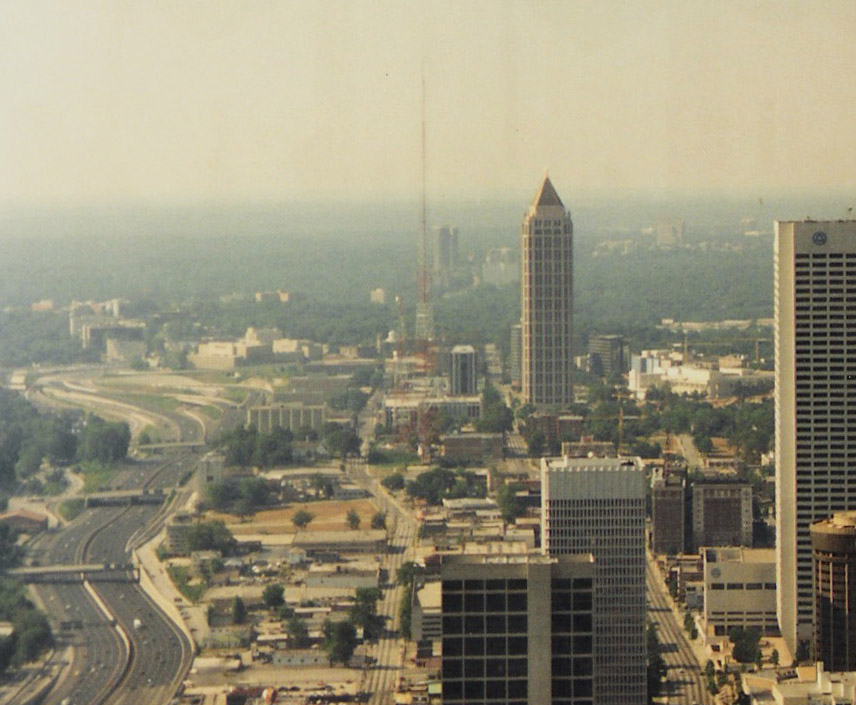
The former WJRJ/WTCG/WTBS lattice tower (center) with One Atlantic Center in the background, c. 1988

WJRJ-TV signed on at 4:00 p.m. on Friday, September 1, 1967. Owned by Atlanta businessman Jack M. Rice, the station's studios were located at 1018 West Peachtree Street N.E., the former home of WAGA-TV. A 1,049-foot-tall (320 m) steel lattice tower was erected next to the studios; the construction of which encountered several delays that caused WJRJ's sign-on date to be delayed three times. It was the first ultra high frequency (UHF) station in the market since WQXI-TV (channel 36) was taken dark in 1955. In addition to a schedule of reruns and feature films, WJRJ-TV carried network programming rejected by WAGA-TV (CBS), WAII-TV/WQXI-TV (ABC) and WSB-TV (NBC); this ranged from the NBC Tuesday Night at the Movies, the ABC Evening News, and National Hockey League telecasts from CBS. WJRJ also aired a local weekly country and western music show, J.R. Jamboree.

The station lost $305,000 during its first six months of operation. To secure additional funds, Rice issued an initial public offering of 130,000 shares of stock, 35 percent of Rice Broadcasting's outstanding stock, at $4.75 per share. The losses continued despite this, and by August 1969, WJRJ-TV lost a combined $800,000. During the spring of 1969, WJRJ-TV utilized billboards operated by Robert E. "Ted" Turner III, who was aggressively expanding his late father's advertising business throughout the southern United States and purchased a radio station in Chattanooga, Tennessee, using empty billboards to promote it. WJRJ's billboard usage caught Turner's attention, who theorized that he could use his billboards to promote the station and thus generate profits. Despite grave financial warnings from his advisors, Turner announced on March 3, 1969, a preliminary agreement to merge his Turner Communications Corporation into Rice Communications. While Rice was purchasing Turner, it was structured as a $2.5 million deal in stock, where Turner shareholders held 77 percent ownership of the new company, renamed Turner Communications Group. Ted Turner himself held a 48.2 percent stake in company stock while Jack Rice had 6.8 percent interest. The merger closed on January 26, 1970.

Under Turner management, the station began a total programming overhaul, dubbed "17 Changes on 17". The station added rock music showcase The Now Explosion in June 1970, picking it up from WATL, a UHF competitor that signed on during the Rice-Turner merger. Initially a weekend program, The Now Explosion expanded to weeknights within a month. The station's sign-on was moved to a daily 7 a.m. time, allowing for a morning block of cartoons. On July 27, 1970, the station was renamed WTCG, formally standing for "Turner Communications Group" but with a hidden second meaning of "Watch This Channel Grow". The station also began to call itself "Super 17" but as tongue-in-cheek, as financial losses continued despite the multiple changes. Turner lost $900,000 during his first year of owning channel 17. WATL suspended operations on March 31, 1971, due to low advertising revenue; believing this to be a great victory for WTCG, Turner hosted a two-hour special thanking viewers, with a band playing live music and featuring impromptu interviews with station staff. Georgia Championship Wrestling moved from WQXI-TV to WTCG on December 25, 1971, airing on Saturday evenings. By 1973, WTCG turned a profit for the first time.

In 1972, Turner was approached by Andy Goldman, marketing director for TelePrompTer's cable systems in Alabama, about distributing WTCG to their 200,000 subscribers. The station had added telecasts of the Atlanta Braves and Atlanta Hawks, and Goldman saw WTCG as "a product worth someone putting up $4.95 for". This occurred as the Federal Communications Commission (FCC) implemented a rules package for the cable industry, allowing as many as two out-of-market stations to be imported by systems in the top 100 markets. WTCG was not compensated for the carriage on cable but did benefit from direct response advertising, and was soon distributed to systems in Tennessee, North Carolina, South Carolina and Florida via microwave relay. By June 1976, WTCG was carried by 95 cable systems in six Southeastern states, reaching an estimated 440,000 households.

== Uplinking WTCG to satellite ==
Goldman, promoted to TelePrompTer's vice president of marketing, again approached Turner in 1975, this time to inform him of premium cable service Home Box Office (HBO)'s plans to transmit nationwide using communications satellites, elevating it from a regional channel. Concurrently, the FCC repealed "leapfrogging rules" limiting cable systems to select distant signals based on closeness to the system; the FCC's Cable Television Bureau argued superstations were unlikely to form due to a lack of evidence television stations economically benefited from being on cable. Distant signals were also allowed to be imported by cable systems during the overnight hours as a timeshare. Turner learned through research that WTCG could be uplinked via their transmitter to satellite and made available to cable and C-band satellite services across the country, providing cable operators desiring additional channels with his programming, all while being a cost-effective alternative from microwave and telephone landlines.

Ted [Turner] walked in here one day in 1976 and said, "Have you got an earth station?" I said, "Sure Ted, we'll work up some proposals...." And he said, "I want one right now -- tomorrow." And I said, "Tomorrow?" But the next day, we got a check.

— Sidney Topol, Scientific Atlanta president, 1979

HBO was uplinked to satellite for the first time to carry the "Thrilla in Manila" boxing match on October 1, 1975. The following month, at the 1975 Western Cable Show in Anaheim, California, Turner announced WTCG was looking at a satellite uplink of their own. After signing a deal with RCA American Communications for transponder space, Turner established Southern Satellite Systems (SSS) as a common carrier uplink provider to serve as WTCG's redistributor. Turner raised enough capital to support SSS through loans by First Chicago Bank, Chase Bank and Chemical Bank, and pension funds like TIAA. To bypass FCC rules requiring a common carrier need to be a middleman between WTCG and cable providers, Turner sold SSS in March 1976 to former Western Union vice president of marketing Edward L. Taylor for $1. After the deal closed, Turner and SSS signed an agreement to uplink WTCG to Satcom 1, while SSS leased a Series 8000 Satellite Earth Terminal from Scientific Atlanta.

While announcing the SSS distribution deal, Turner suggested WTCG could potentially become the impetus for a fourth television network, an idea he continued to hold into the early 1980s. Turner testified before the House Subcommittee on Communication in June 1976, and advocated for cable systems to be able to import additional signals to benefit the consumer, and saw WTCG as a safe, family-friendly alternative that leaned on classic movies and sports. The Copyright Act of 1976, passed by Congress in October 1976, contained a section granting cable systems a compulsory license allowing them to retransmit stations across the country regardless of consent, with the U.S. Copyright Office establishing the Copyright Royalty Tribunal (CRT) to administer royalty fees.

I don't think anybody understood what it meant at the time. It was one of those TV technical things. It was an unproven technology, and there was no guarantee he would ever make money from it. I mean, what the hell made him think 100 million people wanted to watch this little UHF station [when] no one was watching it in Atlanta?

— Joe Wheeler, WTCG field engineer, later Turner senior vice president of production

WTCG first used a satellite uplink on October 27, 1976, to feed an Atlanta Hawks–Los Angeles Lakers game back to the station. The FCC approved SSS's request to serve as a common carrier for WTCG on December 17, 1976, and praised the proposal as "an innovative combination of new technology and established practices". At 1 p.m. ET (12 p.m. CT) that afternoon, WTCG was uplinked and transmitted to cable systems in Grand Island, Nebraska, Newport News, Virginia, Troy, Alabama, and Newton, Kansas. WTCG's first national broadcast was the 1948 Dana Andrews–Cesar Romero film Deep Waters, which started 30 minutes earlier on channel 17. SSS initially charged cable systems 10 cents per subscriber to transmit WTCG full-time and 2 cents per subscriber to carry it as an overnight, post-sign-off timeshare, which WTCG itself did not earn any profit from. Turner spent about $6 million of WTCG's $14 million in annual gross revenue at the time on satellite transmission.

WTCG's growing availability on cable led the Motion Picture Association of America (MPAA), concerned about potential financial losses on programs distributed by MPAA members that aired on superstations, to petition the FCC in 1977 for an investigation. The MPAA was supported by the National Association of Broadcasters (NAB) along with Kelly Broadcasting, McGraw-Hill Broadcasting and Taft Television & Radio Company; WHIZ-TV in Zanesville, Ohio, considered superstations as "threatening" and the FCC's approval of them as "unconstitutional". The MPAA also lodged an effort to deny SSS's application to grant an expansion of WTCG's service to Puerto Rico, Alaska and Canada. In turn, Turner vowed to air increased amounts of highbrow and educational programming over WTCG and institute twice-hourly news updates beyond the bare minimum of news the station had been notorious for. Unlike other superstations that were uplinked to satellite (including WOR-TV in New York City, WGN-TV in Chicago and KTVU in Oakland–San Francisco) WTCG marketed itself to their cable audience, becoming an "active" superstation; WOR, WGN and KTVU were "passive" superstations that remained focused on their home markets. By June 1977, WTCG was available to 800,000 homes in 17 states, and available on TelePrompTer's New York City systems in October 1978, when their rate card was adjusted to better reflect the national cable audience.

== WTBS: centerpiece of the Turner networks ==
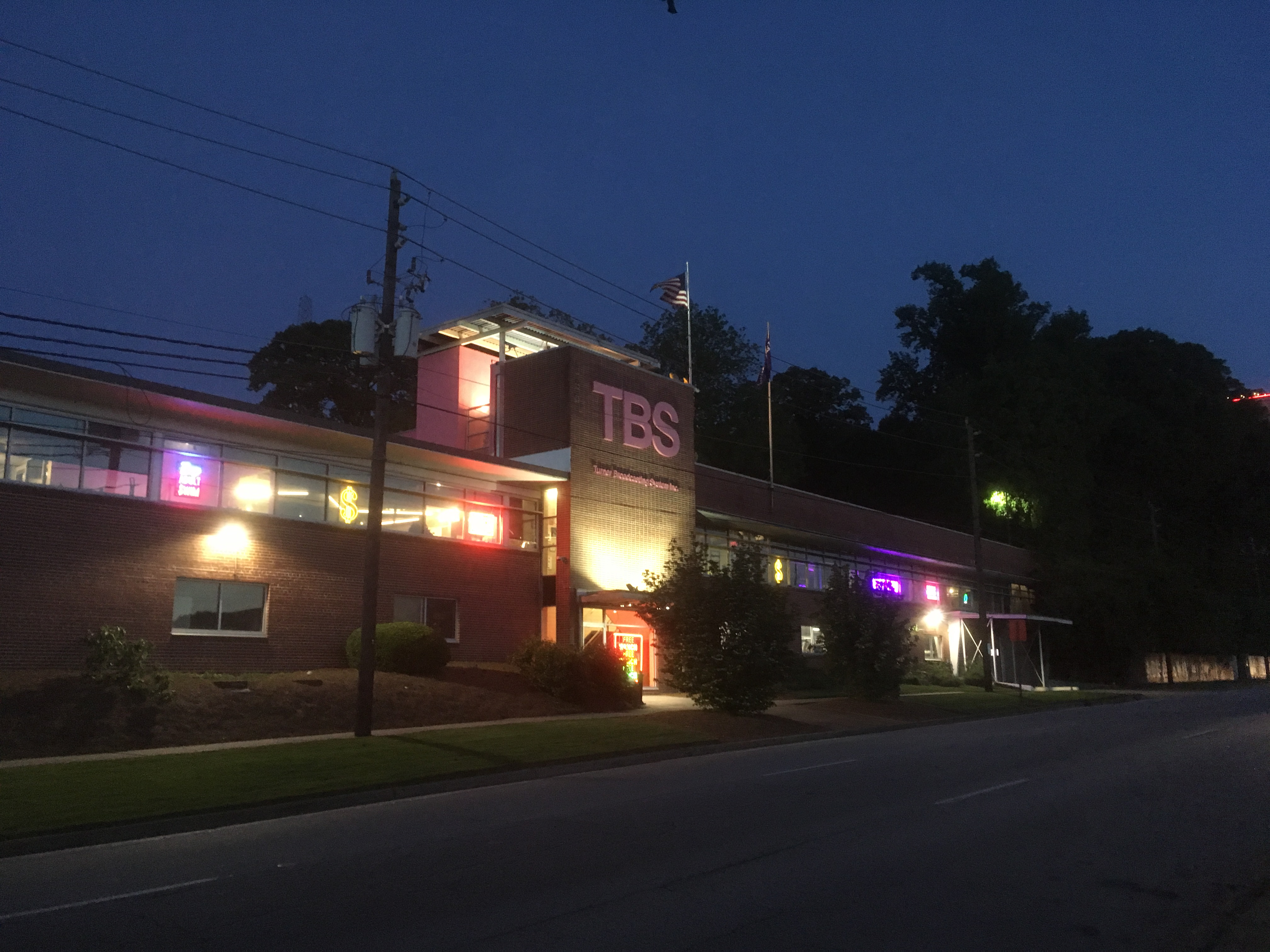
Auxiliary studios for WTBS/TBS, now home to the Williams Street studio

WTCG changed its call sign to WTBS on August 27, 1979, alongside with a corporate name change to Turner Broadcasting System. Turner also registered a trademark on "Superstation". The name change was possible after Turner donated $25,000 to the Massachusetts Institute of Technology, which held the WTBS calls for their student-run radio station, followed by another $25,000. When the switch happened, WTBS was available on 1,000 cable systems nationwide and 80 percent of the station's measured audience came from outside of Georgia, prompting the new corporate name. The initials "TBS" held a strong similarity to CBS, leading the Atlanta Journal's Jeff Denberg to suggest it was Turner's "... more grandiose scheme to rock the establishment CBS, ABC and NBC". Turner's previous pledge to upgrade the quality of channel 17's programming came with acquisitions of Upstairs, Downstairs, The Search for the Nile and The Ascent of Man, children's shows Romper Room and Gigglesnort Hotel (both without commercials) and various panel discussion shows in prime time.

With the renaming, reports surfaced that the personnel Turner hired to launch CNN in the summer of 1980 were also considering a nightly newscast over WTBS. Outside of short news bulletins, channel 17's previous efforts at news were limited to 17 Update Early in the Morning, a 3 a.m. ET newscast anchored by Bill Tush that bordered on satirical comedy with comedy skits intended to skirt around existing FCC public service regulations. 17 Update had a cult following; in 1979, the town of Valdez, Alaska, invited Tush to be the grand marshal of their annual winter parade. The development of CNN prompted Turner to urge Tush to present the news more seriously, and offered Tush a sketch comedy show Tush, which ran for 22 episodes on WTBS starting in 1980.

Turner acquired The Progressive Club, a former golf course at 1050 Techwood Drive, for $9.65 million in early 1980 and repurposed it for both CNN and WTBS; the site was chosen because of its closeness to the existing WTBS studios and tower. To help stimulate viewer demand for the new channel, WTBS simulcast CNN on July 31, 1980, for a 24-hour period. WTBS added a next-day rebroadcast of CNN's nightly talk show Freeman Reports, and the TBS Evening News, anchored by David Allan Jensen with meteorologist Dallas Raines, premiered on July 21, 1980. While the Evening News increased WTBS's news staff, the newscast was nationally-oriented with CNN-filed reports. On June 29, 1981, WTBS began starting programs at :05 and :35 past, a practice dubbed "Turner Time", intended to attract dissatisfied network viewers channel surfing during commercial breaks. A.C. Nielsen began measuring WTBS's audience starting in 1981, where it had an average of 1 million viewers and recorded a $17.9 million profit. When CNN2 launched on January 1, 1982, as a headline-driven channel patterned after all-news radio, CNN and WTBS simulcast CNN2's inaugural half-hour broadcast.

Starcade, which aired from 1982 to 1984, was a game show with contestants vying to win an arcade cabinet by playing various games, and was the first television show to spotlight gamer culture. The Catlins was a Dynasty-style prime time soap opera which ran from 1983 to 1985, and was the only Procter & Gamble serial to be produced for cable television. Sitcoms Down to Earth, Rocky Road, and Safe at Home were produced by Arthur Annecharico’s The Arthur Company, and formed a block of first-run comedy series aimed at a family audience. After The Disney Channel cancelled The New Leave It To Beaver in 1986, WTBS picked it up and produced 70 additional episodes, running it alongside reruns of the original Leave it to Beaver. Night Tracks, which debuted in 1983, featured music videos in the weekend overnight hours, aimed at the 18–34 demographic but excluded any videos with racy or violent content from airplay. Night Tracks was used as the basis for the Cable Music Channel, which operated for five weeks in 1984.

WTBS re-branded as "SuperStation TBS" on September 7, 1987, emphasizing the channel's national prominence. The name change came with a promotional campaign set to the Three Dog Night song "Celebrate", re-recorded by the band.

After a failed attempt to purchase CBS, Turner Broadcasting acquired Metro-Goldwyn-Mayer/United Artists from Kirk Kerkorian in August 1985, largely for MGM's 2,200 film library. UA was sold back to Kerkorian to help finance the $1.5 billion deal. Originally an all-cash purchase, Turner restructured the deal to be largely composed of junk bonds. The deal closed on March 26, 1986, but left Turner overleveraged with debt. By June 5, 1986, MGM was sold back to Kerkorian, the studio lot was divested to Lorimar-Telepictures, and Turner retained the MGM pre-1986 library. Turner lost $187.3 million in 1986, and held $1.34 billion in debt from the MGM purchase, prompting $550 million of company stock to be sold to Kerkorian and 14 different cable system operators but allowing Turner to retain control. One of these systems was Tele-Communications Inc. (TCI), which acquired a 22 percent stake; TCI chairman John C. Malone floated the idea of Turner operating a basic cable channel to address WTBS's compulsory license fees, either by launching a second channel or converting WTBS's superstation feed and surrendering the channel 17 license. Turner proposed a second channel, TNT, with the MGM library as its core, which launched in 1988.

The FCC re-enacted Syndication Exclusivity (syndex) rules on May 18, 1988, granting local stations the ability to claim exclusive rights to syndicated programs and compel cable systems to blackout any out-of-market stations, including superstations, that carried said programs. This was a reversal from when the FCC repealed syndication blackout rules in 1981. The law also closed a terrestrial loophole allowing superstations to pay local single market rates for programs while also selling their extended coverage to advertisers. With the new laws taking effect on January 1, 1990, multiple superstations sought indemnification against blackouts. While WGN-TV and distributor United Video jointly licensed as much shows as possible for WGN's superstation feed, and WWOR-TV's distributor created the WWOR EMI Service, WTBS and Turner licensed the majority of programming for both the Atlanta and superstation feeds and called themselves "100% blackout-free". Reruns of older shows like Little House on the Prairie, The Andy Griffith Show, Bonanza and The Brady Bunch continued to be among WTBS's most popular into the early 1990s.

SSS also used the WTBS signal for the national distribution of teletext. By 1982, SSS was distributing services from United Press International, Reuters, Dow Jones, and View Weather for extraction by cable operators to be displayed as their own channels. In 1982, Keyfax, a national teletext magazine from Field Enterprises, debuted on the WTBS vertical blanking interval (VBI) using the British teletext standard, World System Teletext. In 1985, SSS switched to offering Electra, a service of Taft Broadcasting. By 1992, TBS was available in 58 million households with cable and satellite television service, accounting for more than half of all homes in the United States, Puerto Rico and the U.S. Virgin Islands—and carried by 14,815 cable systems throughout the country.

Original animated programs such as Captain Planet and the Planeteers, 2 Stupid Dogs, and SWAT Kats: The Radical Squadron were also added as part of the "Sunday Morning In Front of the TV" block.

== Time Warner purchase; becoming a basic cable channel ==
Time Warner reached an agreement to buy Turner Broadcasting System for $7.5 billion on September 22, 1995. Turner said of the merger, "I'm tired of being small. I want to be big", while Time Warner CEO Gerald M. Levin called it a "dream deal". When the deal closed in October 1996, Turner held a 10 percent interest in Time Warner, oversaw all cable channel holdings and was named to the company's board of directors. It was at the time the largest media company in the world.

TBS, which heretofore continued to operate as the superstation feed of WTBS, was relaunched as a basic cable channel on January 1, 1998. This switch coincided with Time Warner acquiring SSS from Liberty Media for $213 million, giving Time Warner full control over the uplinking of TBS. Converting TBS to a basic cable channel required approval from MLB, ESPN and Fox Sports to retain the station's Braves contract, as the station no longer needed to pay superstation royalties. Fox's agreement came alongside a court settlement where Time Warner Cable agreed to carry Fox News on their cable systems. TBS agreed to carry 95 Braves games in 1998, down from 125 games in 1997. Turner sought to retain as many games as possible, but according to Porter Bibb, "practicality won out over his heart". As a contingency in the event no agreement was reached, Time Warner acquired the rights to multiple feature films for both TBS and TNT. The conversion also required renegotiations from cable providers, as TBS projected to collect $100 million in five year through subscriber fees, which Time Warner planned to use to pay down debt.

The change of TBS from a SuperStation to a basic cable network is not as dramatic as the destruction of the Omni or Atlanta–Fulton County Stadium. But it is yet another marker of a city, a company and a man that keep transforming, gaining much, maybe losing a little as well.

— Phil Kloer, The Atlanta Journal-Constitution

TBS started to refocus their programming in 1999 in favor of made-for-tv movies, reality show Ripley's Believe It or Not! and short-lived comedy series The Chimp Channel, while documentaries and National Geographic specials were shifted over to CNN. Professional wresting was dropped from TBS when WCW Saturday Night was cancelled in August 2000 and WCW Thunder (which debuted in 1998) in March 2001, the latter resulting in WCW's closure and sale to the WWF. All remaining non-sitcom programs, in particular Little House on the Prairie, were dropped in September 2003; by June 2004, the channel rebranded as "TBS: Very Funny", with an all-comedy focus intended to complement TNT, which was reoriented to scripted drama shows and feature films.

The changes coincided with Turner's withdrawal from the company and station he founded. Time Warner's 2001 purchase by American Online (AOL) closed right as the dot-com bubble burst, causing Turner to lose up to $7 billion in stock value. Turner resigned as vice chairman of AOL Time Warner in 2003 and from Time Warner's board by 2006. The Braves were then sold to Liberty Media in May 2007 through a cash-and-stock deal.

== Split from the Atlanta signal ==
In 2006, TBS acquired rights to a national MLB package of postseason games beginning in 2007 and 26 Sunday games in 2008; Braves telecasts would be moved from TBS to a regional platform. While TBS committed to running 70 Braves games in 2007, the channel was earning more revenue with popular reruns of Seinfeld and Friends. Turner Broadcasting announced in late June 2007 that WTBS would relaunch as WPCH-TV "Peachtree TV", programming specifically to an Atlanta audience and inheriting the Braves games. The split also resulted in TBS being available to Atlanta-area cable subscribers. Due to how the CRTC licensed WTBS to be uplinked, the license was reauthorized to uplink WPCH and not TBS, and the MLB on TBS was made available in Canada via Sportsnet. The Meredith Corporation, owner of CBS affiliate WGCL-TV, took over WPCH's operations in January 2011 by local marketing agreement, coinciding with Braves games moving from Turner Sports to Fox Sports South.

TBS ventured into airing late-night talk shows with Lopez Tonight (2009–2011), Conan (2010–2021) and The Pete Holmes Show (2013–2014), each with varying degrees of success. In 2011, TBS, TNT and TruTV obtained a portion of the television rights to the NCAA Men's Division I Basketball Championship alongside existing rights holder CBS. During the first quarter of 2012, TBS's viewership in the 18-49 adult demographic beat all other basic cable channels despite TBS not airing any original programming in prime time or having any show among the 50 highest-rated cable programs. During the 2015 Turner Upfront, TBS president Kevin Reilly announced the channel would have an expanded development slate focused on live-action comedies, animated series, late-night talk shows and "big unscripted ideas with attitude". One of the first greenlit shows from this effort was Full Frontal with Samantha Bee, created as a compliment to Conan but boasting a diverse writing staff.

AT&T announced their purchase of Time Warner on October 22, 2016, for $108.7 billion, including debt. Following shareholder approval, WPCH-TV was sold outright to the Meredith Corporation on February 20, 2017, for $70 million; this sale prompted FCC chair Ajit Pai to defer a review of the merger by the agency. The U.S. Justice Department sued AT&T and Time Warner to block the deal over antitrust concerns, but was already approved by regulatory authorities in Brazil, Chile, Mexico and the European Commission. District of Columbia U.S. District Court Judge Richard J. Leon dismissed the DOJ's lawsuit on June 12, 2018; two days later, Time Warner was renamed WarnerMedia. The Turner Broadcasting System name was retired on March 4, 2019, as part of a reorganization of WarnerMedia's broadcast assets. TBS was reassigned to the WarnerMedia Entertainment division alongside TBS, TNT, TruTV and HBO.

Discovery, Inc. merged with WarnerMedia on April 8, 2022, to form Warner Bros. Discovery (WBD), creating a series of executive changes at TBS, TNT and TruTV. WBD promptly suspended development on any future scripted programs over TBS and TNT; by then, only three original series still remained on TBS: American Dad!, Chad and Miracle Workers. Full Frontal was also cancelled while American Dad! continued to air new episodes over TBS until 2025, when the show was reacquired by Fox.

After a protracted bidding war, Netflix announced a $72 billion purchase of WBD on December 5, 2025; the deal was to exclude the linear networks (including TBS) and Discovery+, which were to have been spun off into a separate company. Said spin-off company attracted a $25 billion bid from Starz Entertainment, which previously made a bid to acquire A+E Global Media. Three days later, Paramount Skydance, which was formed by a merger in August 2025, attempted a $108.4 billion hostile takeover for the entirety of WBD. While initially rejected, Paramount Skydance's bid was accepted on February 26, 2026, after Netflix withdrew their bid. The deal was closed on October 6, 2026, and Warner Bros. Discovery Global Linear Networks was folded into Paramount Media Networks, which was renamed to Skydance Global Cable Media on November 17, 2026.

== Bibliography ==
- Auletta, Ken (2004). Media Man: Ted Turner's Improbable Empire (1st ed.). New York: W. W. Norton & Company. ISBN 978-0393327496.
- Bibb, Porter (1993). Ted Turner: It Ain't As Easy as It Looks: The Amazing Story of CNN (1st ed.). New York: Crown Publishers. ISBN 978-1555662035.
- Goldberg, Robert; Goldberg, Gerald Jay (1995). Citizen Turner: The Wild Rise of an American Tycoon. New York: Harcourt Brace & Company. ISBN 0-15-118008-3.
- Tigerman, Stephen M. (Fall 1982). "The Growing Problem of Involuntary Superstations". The Journal of Arts, Management and Law. 12 (3). Heldref Publications: 51–66. doi:10.1080/07335113.1982.9942057. ProQuest 1300534009.
- Williams, Christian (1981). Lead, Follow or Get Out of the Way: The Story of Ted Turner. New York: Times Books. ISBN 978-0812910049.
