= WQXI =

WQXI may refer to:

- WQXI (AM), a radio station (790 AM) licensed to Atlanta, Georgia, United States
- WATL (TV), a television station (channel 36 analog/25 digital) licensed to Atlanta, Georgia, United States, which formerly used the call sign WQXI-TV
- WXIA-TV, a television station (channel 11 analog/10 digital) licensed to Atlanta, Georgia, United States, which formerly used the call sign WQXI-TV
- WSTR (FM), a radio station (94.1 FM) licensed to Smyrna, Georgia, United States, which used the call sign WQXI-FM from December 1978 to November 1989
