= WPCH-TV =

Television station in Atlanta

ATSC 3.0 station
- Atlanta, Georgia; United States
- Channels: Digital: 31 (UHF); Virtual: 17
- Branding: Peachtree TV, Atlanta's CW

Programming
- Affiliations: 17.1: The CW; for others, see § Subchannels

Ownership
- Owner: Gray Media; (Gray Television Licensee, LLC)
- Sister stations: WANF, WKTB-CD

History
- First air date: September 1, 1967
- Former call signs: WJRJ-TV (1967–1970); WTCG (1970–1979); WTBS (1979–2007)
- Former channel numbers: Analog: 17 (UHF, 1967–2009); Digital: 20 (UHF, 2002–2019)
- Former affiliations: Independent (1967–1998, 2007–2023); TBS (1998–2007)
- Call sign meaning: "Peachtree"

Technical information
- Licensing authority: FCC
- Facility ID: 64033
- ERP: 805 kW
- HAAT: 329 m (1,079 ft)
- Transmitter coordinates: 33°48′26.4″N 84°20′21.5″W

Links
- Public license information: Public file; LMS
- Website: peachtreetv.com

WPCH-TV (channel 17), branded as Peachtree TV, is a television station in Atlanta, Georgia, United States, affiliated with The CW. It is owned by Gray Media alongside independent station and company flagship WANF (channel 46), and low-power, Class A Telemundo affiliate WKTB-CD (channel 47). WPCH-TV and WANF share studios on 14th Street Northwest in Atlanta's Home Park neighborhood; WPCH-TV's transmitter is located in the Woodland Hills section of northeastern Atlanta.

Atlanta's channel 17 was put on the air by local businessman Jack Rice and began broadcasting as WJRJ-TV on September 1, 1967. At the time the only ultra high frequency (UHF) station serving Atlanta, it was an independent station reliant on programming not carried by the local network affiliates. The money-losing venture found a new investor as Ted Turner, owner of an outdoor advertising firm and radio stations elsewhere in the South, acquired majority control in 1970. Renamed WTCG, the station continued to lose money as it dealt with poor technical facilities and a challenge to its broadcast license. Between 1972 and 1973, channel 17 took over rights to telecast Atlanta Braves baseball (the team later being bought by Turner), Atlanta Hawks basketball, and Atlanta Flames hockey. It became a desirable station for cable television operators in the Southeast and by 1976 was seen by viewers in six states.

Turner believed that there would be a market for WTCG nationally if it were distributed by satellite, a new idea at the time. In cooperation with Southern Satellite Systems (SSS), an independent company set up for the purpose, WTCG began broadcasting to cable systems beyond the Southeast on December 17, 1976. With its lineup of sports coverage, professional wrestling, an extensive film library, and classic TV series, WTCG became the first superstation, ushering in a new era for the cable industry. Within three years, WTCG was distributed by satellite to 4.8 million households. WTCG became WTBS, for Turner Broadcasting System, in 1979. In the years that followed, WTBS added original programming, including national rights to college football and NBA basketball as well as series such as Captain Planet and the Planeteers. A limited amount of public affairs programming for the Atlanta area was seen only on channel 17 and not via satellite. The channel rebranded as TBS in 1987.

As a superstation, WTBS commanded substantial reach; by 1992, it was available in more than half of all households in the United States. It made Turner a household name and served as the cornerstone of a media empire that grew to include CNN and Turner Network Television (TNT). The Braves gained a national fandom from their superstation telecasts. However, Turner could not charge cable operators directly to carry WTBS; instead, they paid SSS, while Turner was able to charge for national advertising. This changed when TBS became a basic cable channel on January 1, 1998, after Turner Broadcasting System was purchased by Time Warner. WTBS continued to be broadcast over-the-air in Atlanta, offering a reduced number of Braves games to local and national viewers under new contracts with Major League Baseball (MLB).

As part of a new national rights contract with MLB, TBS Braves coverage ceased at the end of the 2007 season, and on October 1, channel 17 became a local independent station as WPCH-TV, Peachtree TV. It offered sitcom reruns and feature films to Atlanta-area viewers as well as those in Canada, who continued to receive the WPCH feed for regulatory reasons. In 2011, the Meredith Corporation, then-owner of channel 46 (as WGCL-TV), assumed operational control of WPCH-TV under a local marketing agreement; the Braves moved all games to cable the next season. Meredith acquired WPCH-TV outright in 2017 as Time Warner sought to facilitate regulatory approval for its acquisition by AT&T; after the transaction, channel 17 began airing a 9 p.m. local newscast produced by WGCL-TV.

Gray acquired Meredith in 2021, bringing channel 17 back under local ownership. The new ownership expanded local news and entertainment programming. In 2023, WPCH-TV took over from WUPA (channel 69) as Atlanta's CW affiliate. WPCH-TV broadcasts as Atlanta's ATSC 3.0 (NextGen TV) lighthouse station.

== WJRJ-TV: The Jack Rice years ==
=== Construction and sign-on ===
Interest in a new commercial television station serving Atlanta heightened in 1965 when the Federal Communications Commission (FCC) first overhauled its television Table of Assignments that June, using a UNIVAC III computer to create an efficient table that minimized impact on other potential nearby channels. Prior to the overhaul, there had been only one commercial ultra high frequency (UHF) allocation for Atlanta, channel 36, which had been previously used by WQXI-TV, owned by Robert Rounsaville as a sister to WQXI radio. WQXI-TV lasted only five months before going dark in May 1955, although Rounsaville held on to the construction permit, later renamed WATL-TV, until May 1965 when he sold the permit to warehouse mogul Daniel H. Overmyer of Toledo, Ohio, for $100,000.

The June 1965 overhaul added two new commercial UHF channels, 46 and 66, after which two firms sought the two different allocations. First to apply for one of the new channels was Rice Broadcasting Inc., owned by Atlanta businessman Jack M. Rice, filing an application for channel 46 on July 15, 1965. Among Rice's vast portfolio at the time was Rice Coal Co., a dealer in coal produced in Kentucky and Tennessee, which he founded in 1950; the Hotel Bel Air in Atlanta, restored from the Colonial Terrace Hotel in 1952; and Atlanta Telemeter, the local franchisee of International Telemeter, Paramount Pictures's pay television subsidiary, through its Home Theaters of Georgia holding company. Rice Broadcasting's board of directors included Georgia Tech head football coach and athletic director Bobby Dodd and Atlanta Telemeter president W. Robert McKinsey. Three months later, on September 28, Alpha Television Corp., owned by former WPIX program manager Albert G. Hartigan, applied for channel 66. On October 20, Rice was granted a construction permit for channel 46 by the FCC.

On February 9, 1966, the FCC released a revised Table of Assignments due to an error in the computer program, causing it to incorrectly register high impact numbers for lower channels; (Note: The computer program examined each of the ten lowest available channels in a community and how it affected the availability of nearby channels, with each of the newly-eliminated channels counted as an "impact." The channel with the least impact was typically selected for the table.) as a result, channel 17 was substituted for channel 66 in Atlanta. Almost immediately—five days after the FCC adopted the new table—Rice undercut Hartigan, filing an amendment to their construction permit, specifying channel 17. The new station, assigned the call letters WJRJ-TV on March 3, was given approval to move to channel 17 on March 29. Rice announced it would operate from the former studios of WAGA-TV, which had moved to its new studios on Briarcliff Road that May; a 1,049-foot-tall (320 m) self-supporting tower was to be erected on-site, bearing a weather sign similar to the one that had been used by WAGA-TV.

McKinsey, named president and general manager of WJRJ-TV, emphasized an "adult", "selective" programming strategy leading up to the station's debut, de-emphasizing sitcoms and children's programming in favor of dramas, anthology series, sporting events, variety shows, public affairs programs, documentaries, and a nightly movie. An hour-long "kaleidoscope" with news capsules was also planned, but was scrapped prior to sign-on.

By the time WJRJ-TV had begun work on their tower in June 1967, they had missed two projected sign-on dates—autumn 1966 and early spring 1967—and were about to miss their third. The following month, WJRJ-TV set another date—September 1—and this time, everything was complete: WJRJ-TV debuted at 4 p.m. on Friday, September 1, 1967, from studios and a transmitter at 1018 West Peachtree Street NE, the former home of WAGA-TV, operating with 832,000 watts of visual effective radiated power; the first program broadcast on channel 17 was the 1964 made-for-TV movie Della starring Joan Crawford. Other first-night programs included two recently-concluded network shows, The Flintstones and The Rogues; a double-feature of Universal Pictures's Sherlock Holmes film series; travelogues and a film on sports; Alfred Hitchcock Presents; and a five-minute news capsule before sign-off at 11:35 p.m.

"Yes, Atlanta, There Is a Channel 17": print advertisement from December 25, 1967, instructing viewers on how to tune to WJRJ-TV

=== A network dumping-ground and J.R. Jamboree ===
Channel 17 was heavily reliant in its early years on carrying programs rejected by Atlanta's network affiliates—WSB-TV (NBC), WAGA-TV (CBS), and WAII-TV/WQXI-TV (ABC); indeed, the following Friday, one Sherlock Holmes movie was replaced with The Wild Wild West, passed up by WAGA-TV in favor of reruns of the 1961–65 CBS legal drama The Defenders. Another major acquisition for WJRJ-TV prior to sign-on was NBC Tuesday Night at the Movies from WSB-TV; WSB-TV general manager Don Heald told The Atlanta Journal they had chosen to air their own movie package in order to attract local advertisers, and that they could find no other place to air them due to an NBC schedule that "simply does not have two adjacent bad hours in it." The long-running religious program Lamp Unto My Feet (from WAGA-TV) and the ABC talk show Issues and Answers (from WAII-TV) aired on Sunday afternoons. Two local programs were added months later: Topic, a public-affairs program, debuted in November; and J.R. Jamboree, a country-western music show, followed the next month.

Hosted by Jim Smart and featuring performances from regulars David Rogers, Carolyn Carl, and house band Dude King and the Cherokees, J.R. Jamboree featured many notable country music stars as guests: Bill Anderson, Bobby Bare, Little Jimmy Dickens, Webb Pierce, Del Reeves, Conway Twitty, Buck Owens, Johnny Paycheck, Mel Tillis, and Dottie West. The program had a more formal approach to country music performances, with guests more inclined to wear sweaters or suits; other forms of music were featured on the program, although country music remained its primary focus. Airing Sundays at 7 p.m., J.R. Jamboree broadcast its final program on October 20, 1968.

1968 saw more notable programming acquisitions by WJRJ-TV from Atlanta's "Big Three" network affiliates. Channel 17 became the home of CBS's National Hockey League telecasts for the 1967–68 season. In February, WJRJ-TV aired the ABC Evening News when WAII-TV dropped the newscast in order to air a Dialing for Dollars movie; that same month, WJRJ-TV picked up three early Sunday evening NBC programs turned down by WSB-TV, including The Frank McGee Report and reruns of Flipper. WJRJ-TV expanded their broadcast day on September 2, 1968, signing on at noon on weekdays to accommodate the addition of four pre-empted daytime game shows: Jeopardy!, Eye Guess, Let's Make a Deal (all from WSB-TV), and Dream House (from WQXI-TV). (Note: Call sign changed from WAII-TV on March 23, 1968.) One Life to Live, a soap opera not seen on WQXI-TV due to a programming conflict, was picked up by channel 17; the soap moved back to channel 11 on January 27, 1969, after a re-shuffling of their afternoon schedule. More reruns, cartoons and movies were added to the lineup, as was a talk show hosted by actor and dancer Donald O'Connor.

Despite the reliance on network rejects, WJRJ-TV quickly hemorrhaged money, losing $305,000 during its first six months of operation. In search of funds, Rice filed with the Securities and Exchange Commission an initial public offering of 130,000 shares of stock—35 percent of Rice Broadcasting's outstanding stock—at $4.75 per share; this deal was approved by the FCC on September 9. $200,000 of the raised funds were for the repayment of short-term loans, with the rest going toward operating expenses. Coupled with the conversion of $220,000 in debentures, the original investors' ownership stake decreased to 65.2 percent. The losses continued into 1969, despite optimism regarding an increase of UHF-capable television sets in Atlanta and increased advertising rates; by the autumn of 1968, WJRJ-TV's accumulated losses totaled over $800,000.

"Good Looking Channel 17": January 27, 1969, print advertisement from WJRJ-TV, branded as "Atlanta 17"

=== Ted Turner's gambit ===
Atlanta businessman Robert Edward "Ted" Turner III had inherited Turner Advertising Company, a successful outdoor advertising firm, following his father's suicide in March 1963; the young Turner proceeded to further build upon his father's past successes, buying out competitors in cities such as Knoxville, Tennessee; Chattanooga, Tennessee; and Greenville, South Carolina, to the point where Turner now owned the largest outdoor advertising company in the Southern United States, and the fifth-largest in the nation. Eager to branch out into other fields of business, Turner soon turned to radio, where he purchased station WAPO in Chattanooga in 1968, switching it to a Top 40 format under the call sign WGOW on January 1, 1969; there he was able to turn a profit by utilizing empty billboards to promote his station. (Note: By the end of 1969, Turner had added to his broadcasting portfolio radio stations in Jacksonville, Florida (WMBR) and Charleston, South Carolina (WTMA-AM-FM); Turner later purchased WLOM in Chattanooga in March 1973.)

Soon bored with the day-to-day operation of radio, Turner went from firm to firm trying to obtain financing for his next venture. One day, Turner met Lee McClurkin, an old acquaintance, by then an executive at Atlanta investment bank Robinson-Humphrey; McClurkin had brokered the Rice stock offering the year before and was quickly coming to regret it, with the firm looking to become a serious loser in the deal. When McClurkin acquainted Turner with an opportunity to purchase a television station in Atlanta, Turner immediately expressed interest. That station was WJRJ-TV, described to Turner as an "underground UHF station"; Turner knew nothing of the abbreviation "UHF", nor could he pick up channel 17 on his television set, if Turner watched television at all during that period. Rice Broadcasting happened to be one of Turner's outdoor advertising clients, having purchased billboards to promote WJRJ-TV, including the "$50,000 Goodlookers' Sweepstakes", held in February 1969 in a desperate attempt to attract viewers. Contestants won prizes by identifying the prize being displayed on WJRJ-TV when their telephone number was called; at least 17 prizes were offered each day during the promotion. All Turner had learned about WJRJ-TV up to that point was what he had read on his own billboards; Turner, however, reasoned that television was a rapidly growing medium that would soon cut into his outdoor advertising profits, and that the use of his own billboards to promote the station, as he had done before with WGOW, would help generate profits for WJRJ-TV.

The guy's really got balls. If you were given the opportunity to mortgage your house with a 25-percent second mortgage to make a payroll offer on a TV station you didn't need, would you do it? Ted didn't blink an eye.

— Lee McClurkin

Despite grave warnings from his advisors, including from one colleague who informed Turner he stood to lose $700,000 per year for the first two years of operation, Turner went through with the idea, and on March 3, 1969, Rice Broadcasting and what had now been called Turner Communications Corporation reached a preliminary agreement in principle to merge; in late June, a definitive agreement was reached between the parties, subject to regulatory and shareholder approval. The merger involved an exchange of stock: Rice would issue around 1.2 million shares of Rice Broadcasting stock to Turner shareholders at the rate of 3.7 Rice shares to one Turner share, thereby giving the Turner shareholders 77-percent ownership of the surviving company; Rice Broadcasting would then change its name to Turner Communications. Ted Turner's ownership in the new company would be 48.2 percent, while Jack M. Rice would end up with a 6.8-percent interest. The value of the stock involved totaled about $2.5 million, plus $150,000 for the tower in a separate deal with a real estate partnership controlled by Rice's former owners.

Before the merger could be approved, Rice first had to clear a regulatory hurdle: in 1962, to curb an increase in license "trafficking" around that time, the FCC adopted a rule requiring television and radio station owners who sought to transfer stations owned for less than three years to undergo a hearing, unless a case was successfully made to the FCC of "unforseen changed circumstances and of hardship". Rice was granted a waiver after demonstrating to the FCC WJRJ-TV's enormous losses since sign-on; although revenues had shot up to over $586,000 during the first nine months of 1969, Rice nevertheless lost over $303,000. On December 10, 1969, the FCC approved the transfer to Turner, and on January 26, 1970, the merger closed, giving Turner his first television property.

== WTCG: Ted Turner in the 1970s ==
=== New regime, new schedule, new challenges ===
When Ted Turner moved into the ownership role of WJRJ-TV in January 1970, the Atlanta broadcasting landscape had changed: channel 17 now had to deal with UHF competition in WATL-TV (channel 36), which had begun broadcasting on August 16, 1969, with a lineup that included Lost in Space, Star Trek, a block of early prime-time game shows, and The Joey Bishop Show. Turner had also inherited problems from within: WJRJ-TV was in total shambles. The generator was rusty; there was no de-icer on the transmitter tower, causing chunks of ice to dangerously fall onto the employee parking lot; hard hats were furnished for those who chose not to park several blocks away from the tower. One night, after a few drinks, Turner scaled the tower on a dare; two-and-a-half hours later, Turner came back down, claiming to his friend, Turner president and chief operating officer Jim Roddey, that he had made it to the top. Turnover in the station was high; Turner recalled a small group of about two to three dozen workers, "mainly hippies" and inexperienced college-aged engineers, when he came to channel 17. Technical problems under Rice, and in the early Turner period, were many: the transmitter cut off whenever a heavy wind blew in Atlanta; inside the control room there was only one switcher, leaving WJRJ-TV unable to broadcast and make their own commercials at the same time, forcing them to make commercials while the station was off the air in the early hours of the morning. One time, Turner could not even afford blank videotape to make commercials, instead reusing old videotapes of Divorce Court left behind by WAGA-TV. Gene Wright, chief engineer of channel 17, said that the operators "would sit around playing banjos and smoking pot while the movie would run out."

It was shortly into his tenure, however, that Turner was suddenly dumped in front of a regulatory challenge: in January, WJRJ-TV was listed among many Atlanta-area television and radio stations charged by Lonnie C. King Jr. of the Atlanta chapter of the NAACP with failing to implement equal opportunity programs, as recently required by the FCC of broadcast stations with at least five employees; King sought to challenge their licenses if they did not comply with the new requirement. WJRJ-TV refused to submit an agreement that was deemed satisfactory, and on March 30, WJRJ-TV and four radio stations—WGUN, WAVO-AM-FM, and WTJH—had petitions filed against them by the Community Coalition on Broadcasting, of which the Atlanta NAACP and the Southern Christian Leadership Conference were a part, asking the FCC to either deny their license renewals or grant probationary licenses.

One of the first things I learned is that outside of New York and Los Angeles, there's no way two indies in the same market can make money. Especially 2 [UHFs]. I knew when they [WATL-TV] came on that one of us would be off the air before too long. And I was going to be damn certain it wasn't us.

— Ted Turner

Undeterred by these challenges, Turner set to work on improving channel 17's image. In February, WJRJ-TV added hours of new programming to their schedule while shifting other programs to different time slots in what WJRJ-TV called "17 Changes on 17"; their weekday sign-on shifted further back to 10:30 a.m. with a new acquisition, The Steve Allen Show. Elsewhere, more sitcoms and children's programs were added in the weekday afternoon hours, while Batman aired in a one-hour block on Sundays to allow both parts of a two-part story to air back-to-back. WJRJ-TV, for a time, continued Rice's programming philosophy of picking up programs pre-empted by other stations. Among the station's "17 changes" was ABC's The Dick Cavett Show; originally airing on WATL-TV when it premiered in December, WJRJ-TV acquired the rights to the series over one month later. On April 19, channel 17 picked up NBC's telecast of the 24th Tony Awards ceremony so that WSB-TV could air an NBA match between the Atlanta Hawks and Los Angeles Lakers.

July 25, 1970, print advertisement announcing call sign change to WTCG

Turner made three crucial changes heading into the summer of 1970. The Now Explosion, a television program combining contemporary rock music with dancing and colorful visual effects, had been a considerable success for WATL-TV since its debut on March 14, airing for 15 consecutive hours on Saturdays and 13 consecutive hours on Sundays. Turner picked up the rights from channel 36 in June and aired it in four-hour blocks every weekend afternoon and evening from June 13, except for a six-hour block on Saturday nights; the show expanded to late weeknights after The Dick Cavett Show returned to WQXI-TV in July 1970, but was replaced in that time slot by The Merv Griffin Show, pre-empted by WAGA-TV, that September. The second change, effective two days later, involved a further push-back of the sign-on time to 7 a.m. seven days a week, with 3 1/2 hours of cartoons every morning. Finally, WJRJ-TV started carrying the CBS series Medical Center on July 8; WAGA-TV had pre-empted Medical Center and Hawaii Five-O—the latter relegated to a Saturday afternoon spot—in favor of their own movies. Channel 17 aired the complete 1970–71 season while the show was at the peak of its popularity; it was the eighth-highest Nielsen-rated program on television. (Note: Hawaii Five-O was ranked #7 for the 1970–71 season.) On April 21, 1971, WAGA-TV moved both shows back to their proper time slots. On July 27, 1970, in the midst of Turner's complete overhaul of the channel 17 schedule and its expanded broadcast week, Turner relaunched channel 17 as WTCG, (Note: Although announced on July 27, the FCC granted the call sign change on July 1.) standing for "Turner Communications Group"; behind the call letters, however, was a second meaning, promoted by Turner: "Watch This Channel Grow".

At the suggestion of a woman who had briefly worked in WTCG's promotion department, Turner began branding WTCG as "Super 17"—a tongue-in-cheek concept, as financial losses had continued to pile up month after month despite technical and programming upgrades; by the end of their first year of owning WTCG, Turner had lost $900,000. Later that year, Turner purchased WCTU-TV in Charlotte, North Carolina, from its original owners; originally intending to acquire its equipment and parts for WTCG, Turner wanted to operate it as well. As Turner's board rejected the sale, Turner instead paid for WCTU-TV with his own cash. The recurring losses from WTCG and purchase of the Charlotte station, coupled with an overestimation of his outdoor advertising profits, caused Turner to enter 1971 in dire financial straits. For the Charlotte station, by then renamed WRET-TV, Turner held a telethon to raise the funds necessary to keep going; elsewhere, Turner sold off his outdoor advertising companies in several major Southern cities.

We had nothing to put on. Nothing. Zip. Zero. I just put my audio man in command and took off. It was really embarrassing. Here another station had gone out of business, and Ted goes on the air to thank Atlanta. You got to have brass when you do that.

— R.T. Williams

There was one moment of great fortune for WTCG in 1971: its main UHF competitor, WATL-TV, had gone off the air on March 31, citing low advertising revenues for its failure. Turner, believing WATL-TV's demise to be a "victory over superior forces with bottomless pockets", hosted a two-hour "Thank You, Atlanta" special the evening after WATL-TV's sign-off in a studio filled with balloons and accompanied by a live band. Turner made the entire staff come to the televised party, engaging in impromptu interviews with the employees. The party proved to be incredibly embarrassing for the employees present, with staffers reportedly smoking marijuana while waiting to come on; producer R.T. Williams walked out on the production with ten minutes left in the program. New competition was to come a few months later, though, when WHAE-TV (channel 46), owned by the Christian Broadcasting Network, began broadcasting on June 6, 1971, primarily airing religious programming.

WTCG temporarily went off the air in late October 1971 in order to install a new 65-foot (20 m) antenna that would improve the station's signal. The following month, Turner Communications Corporation reported their first profit since the acquisition of channel 17, with earnings of $836,000 on revenues of over $6.1 million over the first nine months of 1971; WTCG, however, continued to lose money, although not at the rate of the year before: the station lost $490,000 over that same period. Later that month, WTCG formally petitioned ABC to take the affiliation from WQXI-TV, and was rumored to ask the same of NBC and WSB-TV; Robert Goldberg and Gerald Jay Goldberg wrote in Citizen Turner: The Wild Rise of an American Tycoon that Turner's repeated acquisition of programs rejected by channel 2 led him to announce over his own billboards, "The NBC Network Moves to Channel 17", much to the displeasure of Cox Broadcasting Corporation brass and lawyers.

In 1972, the FCC issued WTCG a short-term, one-year renewal of its broadcast license in a response to the 1970 petition to deny by the Community Coalition on Broadcasting. The group had further charged that WTCG had failed to meet the needs of Atlanta's Black community in addition to their previous charges of discrimination. The FCC found WTCG's program proposals "adequate" given its past financial performance. In the years that followed, WTCG produced several series of interest to the Black community, including the Black teen dance show Party. From 1975 to 1977, it produced Future Shock, a syndicated series hosted by R&B singer James Brown.

=== Sports acquisitions and regional carriage ===
Turner continued his aggressive programming overtures during the latter part of 1971 and into 1972, especially in the realm of sports. The first major sporting acquisition occurred on December 25, 1971, through an old girlfriend of Turner's, by then married to the promoter of Georgia Championship Wrestling; she successfully persuaded him to move the weekly program to channel 17 from WQXI-TV, which had been airing the promotion since 1954. Wrestling was held three days a week from WTCG's studios, with a two-hour program airing on Saturday evenings.

The greatest acquisition, and one with which Turner would eventually enjoy an association of over three decades, happened the following year. WSB-TV had been the television home of Major League Baseball (MLB)'s Atlanta Braves since their relocation from Milwaukee in 1966; they had paid the franchise $200,000 per year to air 20 away games. Turner approached the Braves in the late spring of 1972, offering $600,000 annually to air an average of 50 road games per season; despite concerns about overexposure on television, especially on what Braves' director of promotion Bob Hope referred to as a "Mickey Mouse station", management agreed to the deal. Turner then formed the Braves Television Network, composed of 24 affiliated stations in Georgia, Alabama, Florida, North Carolina, South Carolina, and Tennessee, with WTCG as its flagship.

In 1972, WQXI-TV decided to get out of its contract to telecast Atlanta Hawks basketball to reduce the amount of network programming it preempted. WTCG became the broadcaster of 25 road games. In 1975, WTCG became the broadcaster of Atlanta Flames hockey, airing 22 road games in its first season with the team. The acquisition of Braves, Hawks, and Flames rights fulfilled a multiple-year wish of Turner to have the rights to all three teams. WTCG also frequently picked up network sports telecasts preempted by the Atlanta affiliates and syndicated coverage of events such as the World Football League. Turner bought the Braves in 1976 and a majority stake in the Hawks in 1977.

This heavy sports programming, as well as the station's 24-hour schedule, made WTCG a desirable station outside of Atlanta. Later in 1972, Turner was approached by Andy Goldman, marketing director for TelePrompTer's cable systems in Alabama, about distributing WTCG to their 200,000 subscribers. With WTCG's lineup of classic movies, sitcoms and cartoons, and now live sports coverage, Goldman saw WTCG as "a product worth someone putting up $4.95 for". This occurred as the FCC implemented a rules package for the cable industry, allowing as many as two out-of-market stations to be imported by systems in the top 100 markets. WTCG was not compensated for the carriage on cable but did benefit from direct response advertising. It was soon distributed to systems in Tennessee, North Carolina, South Carolina and Florida via microwave relay. By June 1976, WTCG was carried by 95 cable systems in six Southeastern states, reaching an estimated 440,000 households.

=== Bill Tush and 17 Update Early in the Morning ===
One weekend I was watching this local television station that ran all these great movies but they were in such bad shape—they were scratchy, I remember—but they were all the old great black-and-white films that I've always loved. I was hooked on this television station. But the station was so bad I thought I could get a job there.

— Bill Tush

In 1974, Bill Tush, a recently-hired disc jockey working at WGST in Atlanta after stints at several radio stations in his native Pittsburgh, visited WTCG's offices in search of work, having grown tired of working in radio. The first person he met, R.T. Williams, told Tush the station had an opening for a booth announcer, the previous announcer having quit the day before. Tush was hired by channel 17, working part-time for $50 per week. Tush's duties were soon expanded to reading newscasts, including a twenty-minute early-morning newscast following the station's late movie, as well as hosting several movie programs on WTCG; later, he became anchor of a half-hour morning newscast and host of a talk show, Open Up.

However, it was the early-morning newscast, 17 Update Early in the Morning, for which Tush received a devoted fan following. The first sign of the newscast's irreverent nature occurred when Tush yelled back at the director after being ordered to straighten his tie in the middle of the newscast. Tush soon parodied WXIA-TV's (Note: Call sign changed from WQXI-TV on December 24, 1973.) Pro News newscasts as "Dull News"; Turner stopped Tush in the hallway one day, complimenting Tush for the send-up. "I figured," Tush told The Atlanta Journal, "that was the go-ahead."

Tush continued to develop the series over the years. One night, Tush dressed a dog in a shirt and tie, fed it peanut butter to get its lips moving, and passed it off as "Rex the Wonder Dog", his co-anchor; another night, the station staged a parody of WSB-TV's Independence Day festivities using cardboard cut-outs; a report on a rocket launch was depicted with a paper airplane set on fire. At the first mention of Turner's name during a report on Turner's participation in the America's Cup, the camera cut to a picture of Turner in a mock-heroic pose, complete with an accompanying fanfare, before Tush resumed the report exactly where it had been. Reports on consumer affairs were conducted by the "News Chicken", a reporter dressed up in feathers.

In 1979, prior to the launch of Turner's Cable News Network (CNN), Tush was asked by Turner to curb the satirical nature of 17 Update Early in the Morning; Turner feared viewers would not take CNN seriously beside a comedy news show on WTCG. Turner later offered Tush an hour-long comedy-variety series, Tush; Tush later joined CNN, primarily as an entertainment correspondent, until his retirement in 2003.

== Going satellite ==
Turner announced to cable operators in Alabama in October 1975 that it intended to distribute programming either from WTCG or WRET-TV to cable systems nationwide, beyond the feasible reach of microwave networks. In December, Turner ordered an earth station from Scientific Atlanta to uplink the programming. While Turner preferred to uplink the Atlanta station, WRET-TV was a backup in the event that the FCC did not relax rules that prevented the importation of stations located in top-25 television markets into other, more distant top markets, "leapfrogging" closer stations. Under FCC rules of the time, a program originator could not also be a common carrier of telecommunications signals. To remedy this, Turner sold the related assets to Edward R. Taylor, who formed Southern Satellite Systems (SSS) to lease the earth station and a transponder on the new Satcom communications satellite, which already was used to distribute HBO. In turn, cable companies would pay a monthly per-subscriber tariff to SSS. Turner did not receive direct revenue but instead aimed to rely on the national advertising an increased audience would attract.

At 1 p.m. Eastern Time on December 17, 1976, WTCG was uplinked to four cable television providers in the Midwestern and Southeastern United States: Multi-Vue TV's Grand Island, Nebraska, system; Hampton Roads Cablevision in Newport News, Virginia; Troy Cablevision in Troy, Alabama; and Newton Cable TV in Newton, Kansas. All four cable systems started receiving the 1948 film Deep Waters, which was already airing in progress for 30 minutes on channel 17 in Atlanta. By launch, SSS had signed up 60 systems with some 500,000 subscribers. Each system paid 10 cents per subscriber a month for full-day carriage and 2 cents for partial, midnight–morning programming.

In addition to the sports and 24-hour schedule, WTCG aired classic TV series such as I Love Lucy and Gilligan's Island and boasted a film library of more than 3,000 titles. Turner noted in a 1978 interview that the sports-and-movies emphasis "[had] more appeal to upper-income audiences than this idiot network stuff, like The Gong Show". The question of film rights had irked the Motion Picture Association of America, which in 1977 unsuccessfully urged the FCC to put restrictions on superstations. The group expressed concern over loss of revenue from local stations that bought movie packages and over superstations crowding out local stations in the programming and advertising markets.

WTCG was in 787,000 cable homes by November 1977; by May 1978, the station was available full-time in 1.81 million cable homes and at night in 580,000 more, with higher densities in the South and Southwest. Turner TV Sales, a national sales operation, opened its own offices in New York and Chicago, and WTCG revised its advertising rate card effective January 1, 1979, to reflect higher prices for the larger audiences it now reached. SSS signed its 1,000th system on July 10, 1979, bringing WTCG's cable audience via satellite to 4.8 million households plus another 556,000 receiving the station by microwave or over-the-air.

The superstation era began with WTCG and soon took flight with large-market independents from other cities after the FCC opened the doors for other common carriers to uplink independent stations, with applications already at the commission for five of them. WGN-TV in Chicago was uplinked by United Video on November 9, 1978, and WOR-TV in New York City by Eastern Microwave in April 1979. Turner hailed the uplinking of the Chicago station, telling major advertisers, "Hallelujah, I'm looking for them." Unlike other superstations, WTCG was a so-called "active" superstation, the only one with a national rate card and actively promoting itself as a national entity. The other major superstations did not do this so as not to incur the wrath of program suppliers, who could charge much higher national rates to WGN or WOR.

=== Call sign change to WTBS ===
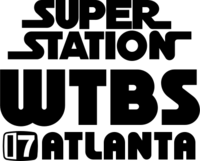
Late 70s/early 80s logo as WTBS

In May 1979, Turner reached an agreement to acquire the call sign WTBS, which then belonged to the FM radio station at the Massachusetts Institute of Technology (MIT), for use by channel 17. At the time, the MIT station needed a new transmitter. Turner agreed to pay $25,000 in exchange for the radio station changing its call sign (it became WMBR) and another $25,000 if Turner successfully obtained WTBS for his use. On August 27, 1979, WTCG became WTBS, for Turner Broadcasting System. The letters were cited by operations director Sidney Pike as easier to pronounce but noted for their similarity to CBS.

After Turner launched CNN on June 1, 1980, WTBS served as a promotional vehicle for the new cable service. On July 21, the station began airing a nightly 10 p.m. newscast, the TBS Evening News, anchored by David Jensen, Ann Butler, Kevin Christopher, and meteorologist Dallas Raines. The program was a national newscast with a style more characteristic of a local newscast. To expose the new CNN to WTBS's 5 million cable homes and generate demand for the new channel, the superstation simulcast CNN for 24 hours on July 31. At the start, profits from WTBS helped to offset losses from CNN.

A. C. Nielsen began measuring WTBS in February 1981, making it the first non-network national service to qualify for the company's continuous ratings. On June 29 of that year, the channel began airing all programs at times starting 5 or 35 minutes past the hour, a practice called "Turner Time", in hopes of catching viewers who would be seeing commercials on other channels.

The early 1980s also brought some original first-run programming to WTBS, including the comedy series Tush, Nice People, the variety show Atlantic City Alive, and a series of specials on the U.S. states titled States of the Union. The station was briefly run by sportscaster Bob Neal from September to November 1981.

=== National sports rights ===
In 1982, WTBS acquired the first-ever national cable television rights to live college football. Turner beat out USA Network and ESPN for a $17.6 million deal with the National Collegiate Athletic Association (NCAA) for games not already aired under the association's pacts with ABC and CBS. By that time, WTBS was in nearly 20 million cable homes. Ahead of the 1984 landmark decision in NCAA v. Board of Regents of the University of Oklahoma, in which the U.S. Supreme Court broke up the NCAA's control of broadcast contracts including the one with Turner, WTBS entered into discussions with three conferences and three independent schools, reaching a deal with the Southeastern Conference (SEC) to telecast games with early Saturday kickoffs. After the 1991 season, the SEC signed an agreement with Jefferson-Pilot Sports to syndicate telecasts, trading national coverage for regional availability on broadcast stations.

In 1984, the NBA signed a two-year national cable deal with WTBS, replacing USA Network and ESPN. The arrangement, which provided for 55 regular-season and 20 playoff games a year, included blackout restrictions within 35 miles (56 km) of the home team's arena. The move helped the NBA consolidate its cable rights and reduce the number of telecasts (there had been 120 under the previous deal) and thus audience fragmentation. WTBS games aired on Tuesday and Friday nights. The new deal blocked WTBS from carrying a package of just Hawks games and limited the national package to 10 Hawks appearances a year; carriage of Hawks games was subsequently acquired by WVEU (channel 69). Between 1984 and 1987, ratings for the average NBA telecast increased 20 percent.

In December 1988, Turner started Turner Network Television (TNT). A clause in Turner's NBA contract allowed it to move NBA games to that channel once it crossed 30 million subscribers, which assumed the NBA package from TBS ahead of the 1989–90 NBA season as a way to grow that channel's subscriber base. TBS continued to show basketball with a package of 25 Hawks games. Because TNT was structured as a typical ad-supported cable channel and not a superstation, Turner received the subscriber fees from that channel.

== TBS in the 1980s and 1990s ==
In the early 1980s, various cable and satellite providers in Canada, mainly in rural areas, started offering American superstations despite the Canadian Radio-television and Telecommunications Commission (CRTC) openly discouraging the practice. In one instance, WTBS was imported to a Geraldton, Ontario, system as early as 1979, with Turner's approval. The CRTC authorized WTBS to be uplinked to satellite on April 4, 1985, along with WOR-TV, WPIX and WGN-TV. Per the authorization, the local Atlanta signal was allowed to be uplinked and not the satellite feed.

WTBS re-branded as "SuperStation TBS" on September 7, 1987, emphasizing the channel's national prominence. The name change came with a promotional campaign set to the Three Dog Night song "Celebrate", re-recorded by the band. By 1992, WTBS was available in 58 million households with cable and satellite television service, accounting for more than half of all homes in the United States, Puerto Rico and the U.S. Virgin Islands—and carried by 14,815 cable systems throughout the country. In the summer of 1994, CBS considered moving its Atlanta affiliation to WTBS: after Fox won the rights to the NFL's National Football Conference, it signed an affiliation deal with New World Communications, owner of longtime Atlanta CBS affiliate WAGA-TV. After being rebuffed by WSB-TV and WXIA, CBS approached WTBS and actually considered buying the station. However, talks broke down when Turner demanded that CBS sell itself to him.

=== Original programming ===
In addition to reruns, movies and sports, WTBS began to offer more original shows. Starcade, which aired from 1982 to 1984, was a game show with contestants vying to win an arcade cabinet by playing various games, and was the first television show to spotlight gamer culture. The Catlins was a Dynasty-style prime time soap opera which ran from 1983 to 1985, and was the only Procter & Gamble serial to be produced for cable television. Sitcoms Down to Earth, Rocky Road, and Safe at Home were produced by Arthur Annecharico's The Arthur Company, and formed a block of first-run comedy series aimed at a family audience. After The Disney Channel cancelled The New Leave It To Beaver in 1986, WTBS picked it up and produced 70 additional episodes, running it alongside reruns of the original Leave it to Beaver.

Night Tracks, which debuted in 1983, featured music videos in the weekend overnight hours, aimed at the 18–34 demographic but excluded any videos with racy or violent content from airplay. Night Tracks was used as the basis for the Cable Music Channel, which operated for five weeks in 1984.

WTBS began airing environmentally-focused programming through a documentary unit established in response to the Carter administration's Global 2000 Report. A Finite World, a five-part series on human overpopulation, aired on WTBS in September 1983. In January 1985, WTBS screened the BBC drama Threads after NBC, ABC and CBS each deferred. Turner stated in a press release, "it's my intention to increase the public's consciousness of the potential dangers of nuclear proliferation. I dream of a future when our children will be freed from the fear of world destruction". The same week, WTBS aired the seventh installment of the Jacques Cousteau Amazon series, "Snowstorm in the Jungle", about cocaine trafficking in Colombia, and was part of a multi-year development deal between Turner and the Cousteau family. Cousteau's "Amazon" series earned WTBS its second Peabody Award in 1985; (Note: This award was credited by the Peabody Awards to Turner Broadcasting System.) the previous year, WTBS won a Peabody for its Portrait of America series.

In 1990, Turner commissioned Captain Planet and the Planeteers, starring the eponymous superhero, for both TBS and syndication. Featuring the voices of LeVar Burton, Richard Gere and Tom Cruise, Captain Planet paralleled Turner's devotion to environmental causes later in life.

=== Professional wrestling ===
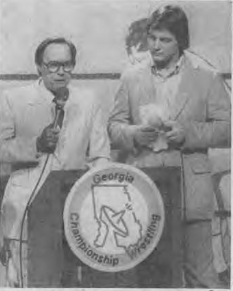
Gordon Solie and Roddy Piper at a Georgia Championship Wrestling taping, c. 1982

If you lived in Georgia in the 1980s, you likely watched TBS more than a network affiliate. It had three things on TV people loved around here — The Andy Griffith Show, the Braves and wrestling. Yeah, I know, it's really rasslin', but my editors won't like that used in a column more than once or twice.

— Bill Shanks, The Macon Telegraph

Professional wrestling debuted on channel 17 on December 25, 1971, when Georgia Championship Wrestling (GCW) moved their weekly tapings from WQXI-TV to WTCG, airing on Saturday evenings. GCW became the first wrestling promotion to have a national audience when WTCG was uplinked and became seen as the flagship of the National Wrestling Alliance (NWA). Taped at the channel 17 studios, Georgia Championship Wrestling had a nationwide audience of 10 million viewers weekly by 1981 and was WTBS's most popular show locally and nationally, with lead announcer Gordon Solie a breakout star. GCW's WTBS show was renamed World Championship Wrestling by 1982 at the request of Turner but continued to be associated with Georgia-style "rasslin'" and had a territorial reach into Ohio, Michigan and West Virginia. It was by 1981 the highest-rated program on cable television.

An internal fight for control of GCW between owner Jim Barnett and booker Ole Anderson resulted in Barnett, Jack Brisco and Jerry Brisco selling their stakes to the World Wrestling Federation (WWF), giving owner Vince McMahon control of the promotion and the WTBS timeslot. On July 14, 1984, World Championship Wrestling was relaunched as a WWF-produced program with no advance notice, featuring taped matches outside of Atlanta and without Solie's involvement. Turner personally received a large volume of protest phone calls, prompting WTBS to pick up a new NWA program Anderson launched, Championship Wrestling from Georgia, at 7:35 a.m. ET Saturdays. WTBS also added Bill Watts' Mid-South Wrestling for Sunday evenings in March 1985, and after two weeks, outdrew the WWF program in the ratings. McMahon sold the remainder of the WWF's WTBS timeslot to Jim Crockett Promotions (JCP) for $1 million, which relaunched World Championship Wrestling as an NWA program in April 1985. JCP gained exclusivity with the timeslot purchase and assumed production of Championship Wrestling from Georgia, while Mid-South Wrestling was dropped.

Between 1987 and 1988, JCP entered into a bitter scheduling rivalry with the WWF, culminating with JCP airing three Clash of the Champions specials for free over WTBS, the first directly opposite the WWF's WrestleMania IV pay-per-view. JCP sold itself and all contracts to Turner Broadcasting in November 1988: the promotion became financially overextended and threatened with bankruptcy, and Turner bought it to keep wrestling on WTBS. After the sale closed, JCP was renamed World Championship Wrestling (WCW). The Saturday show, retitled WCW Saturday Night in 1992, served as the WCW's flagship program but had its influence eroded by Monday Nitro on TNT and WCW Thunder, which TBS debuted in 1998. Facing declining ratings, Saturday Night was converted to a highlights show in April 2000, moved to mornings by July and cancelled the following month. Thunder was dropped in March 2001 alongside the promotion's closure and sale to the WWF; Thunder's cancellation came despite it being TBS's highest-rated show at the time.

=== The MGM library and syndex rules ===
After a failed attempt to purchase CBS, Turner Broadcasting acquired Metro-Goldwyn-Mayer/United Artists from Kirk Kerkorian in August 1985, largely for MGM's 2,200 film library. UA was sold back to Kerkorian to help finance the $1.5 billion deal. Originally an all-cash purchase, Turner restructured the deal to be largely composed of junk bonds. The deal closed on March 26, 1986, but left Turner overleveraged with debt. By June 5, 1986, MGM was sold back to Kerkorian, the studio lot was divested to Lorimar-Telepictures, and Turner retained MGM's pre-1986 library. Turner lost $187.3 million in 1986, and held $1.34 billion in debt from the MGM purchase, prompting $550 million of company stock to be sold to Kerkorian and 14 different cable system operators but allowing Turner to retain control. One of these systems was Tele-Communications Inc. (TCI), which acquired a 22 percent stake; TCI chairman John C. Malone floated the idea of Turner operating a basic cable channel to address WTBS's compulsory license fees, either by launching a second channel or converting WTBS's superstation feed and surrendering the channel 17 license. Turner proposed a second channel, TNT, with the MGM library as its core, which launched in 1988.

The FCC re-enacted Syndication Exclusivity (syndex) rules on May 18, 1988, granting local stations the ability to claim exclusive rights to syndicated programs and compel cable systems to blackout any out-of-market stations, including superstations, that carried said programs. This was a reversal from when the FCC repealed syndication blackout rules in 1981. The law also closed a terrestrial loophole allowing superstations to pay local single market rates for programs while also selling their extended coverage to advertisers. With the new laws taking effect on January 1, 1990, multiple superstations sought indemnification against blackouts. While WGN-TV and distributor United Video jointly licensed as much shows as possible for WGN's superstation feed, and WWOR-TV's distributor created the WWOR EMI Service, WTBS and Turner licensed the majority of programming for both the Atlanta and superstation feeds and called themselves "100% blackout-free". Reruns of older shows like Little House on the Prairie, The Andy Griffith Show, Bonanza and The Brady Bunch continued to be among WTBS's most popular into the early 1990s.

== Time Warner purchase; becoming a basic cable channel ==
Time Warner reached an agreement to buy Turner Broadcasting System for $7.5 billion on September 22, 1995. Turner said of the merger, "I'm tired of being small. I want to be big", while Time Warner CEO Gerald M. Levin called it a "dream deal". When the deal closed in October 1996, Turner held a 10 percent interest in Time Warner, oversaw all cable channel holdings and was named to the company's board of directors. It was at the time the largest media company in the world.

TBS, which heretofore continued to operate as the superstation feed of WTBS, was relaunched as a basic cable channel on January 1, 1998. This switch coincided with Time Warner acquiring SSS from Liberty Media for $213 million, giving Time Warner full control over the uplinking of TBS. Converting TBS to a basic cable channel required approval from MLB, ESPN and Fox Sports to retain the station's Braves contract, as the station no longer needed to pay superstation royalties. Fox's agreement came alongside a court settlement where Time Warner Cable agreed to carry Fox News on their cable systems. TBS agreed to carry 95 Braves games in 1998, down from 125 games in 1997. Turner sought to retain as many games as possible, but according to Porter Bibb, "practicality won out over his heart". As a contingency in the event no agreement was reached, Time Warner acquired the rights to multiple feature films for both TBS and TNT. The conversion also required renegotiations from cable providers, as TBS projected to collect $100 million in five years through subscriber fees, which Time Warner planned to use to pay down debt.

The change of TBS from a SuperStation to a basic cable network is not as dramatic as the destruction of the Omni or Atlanta–Fulton County Stadium. But it is yet another marker of a city, a company and a man that keep transforming, gaining much, maybe losing a little as well.

— Phil Kloer, The Atlanta Journal-Constitution

TBS started to refocus their programming in 1999 in favor of made-for-TV movies, reality show Ripley's Believe It or Not! and short-lived comedy series The Chimp Channel, while documentaries and National Geographic specials were shifted over to CNN. All remaining non-sitcom programs, in particular Little House on the Prairie, were dropped in September 2003; by June 2004, the channel rebranded as "TBS: Very Funny", with an all-comedy focus intended to complement TNT, which was reoriented to scripted drama shows and feature films.

The changes coincided with Turner's withdrawal from the company and station he founded. Time Warner's 2001 purchase by America Online closed right as the dot-com bubble burst, causing Turner to lose up to $7 billion in stock value. After the merger closed, Turner was replaced as head of Turner Broadcasting by The WB president Jamie Kellner. Turner resigned as vice chairman of AOL Time Warner in 2003 and from Time Warner's board by 2006. The Braves were then sold to Liberty Media in May 2007 through a cash-and-stock deal.

Outside of Braves baseball, the only Atlanta-centric programming seen on WTBS by 2002 was a pair of weekend morning public affairs shows. The over-the-air signal was referred to as a "relic" within Time Warner, with viewers noticing little difference, if any, between it and TBS.

== WPCH: Transition to Peachtree TV ==
In 2006, TBS acquired rights to a national package of MLB postseason games beginning in 2007 and 26 Sunday games in 2008; Braves telecasts would also be moved from TBS to a regional platform. While TBS committed to running 70 Braves games in 2007, the channel earned more revenue airing reruns of Seinfeld and Friends, and Braves telecasts suffered ratings declines outside of the team's Southeastern U.S. fanbase. Turner Broadcasting announced in late June 2007 that WTBS would be relaunched as WPCH-TV "Peachtree TV", programming specifically to an Atlanta audience and inheriting the Braves games. The WPCH calls were previously used by an Atlanta FM station for over 30 years; Turner acquired the rights to the call sign after paying a nominal fee to Clear Channel Broadcasting.

The renaming to WPCH and split from TBS took place on October 1, 2007, the day after the 2007 Atlanta Braves season ended. Like TBS, WPCH boasted a heavy emphasis on sitcom reruns during the daytime, but now as counterprogramming against talk shows, courtroom shows and soap operas on competing stations. WPCH also aired blockbuster feature films every weeknight. The split also resulted in TBS being available to Atlanta-area cable subscribers for the first time. Turner did not plan a local newscast for WPCH but hired veteran Charlotte broadcaster Jeff Johnson to be executive director of community affairs and for on-air continuity.

Due to how the CRTC licensed WTBS to be uplinked, the license was reauthorized to uplink WPCH and not TBS, and the MLB on TBS was made available in Canada via Sportsnet. Confusion between TBS and WPCH in Canada persisted years after the split; when TBS hired Conan O'Brien for a late-night talk show in 2010, the Vancouver Sun erroneously reported WPCH would carry the show in Canada.

=== Meredith and Gray ownership ===
The Meredith Corporation, then the owner of WGCL-TV, took over WPCH's operations by a local marketing agreement (LMA) announced on January 18, 2011. The LMA coincided with production of Braves telecasts moving from Turner Sports to Fox Sports South. WPCH relocated to WGCL's studios in Atlanta's Atlantic Station district. Turner Broadcasting withdrew WPCH's yearly sponsorship of Piedmont Park's "Screen on the Green", a move attributed to the LMA. WPCH continued to carry Braves games through the 2012 season, when Fox Sports South and SportSouth assumed all local telecast rights. In 2016, it became the broadcaster of a package of Kennesaw State Owls college football games beginning with the 2016 season.

On February 20, 2017, Meredith bought WPCH outright for $70 million. The purchase was made to help facilitate regulatory approval for AT&T's purchase of Time Warner. FCC chair Ajit Pai consequently deferred a review of the merger by his agency. After the deal closed, WPCH launched a 9 p.m. local newscast produced and anchored by WGCL staff. In 2021, wrestling returned to WPCH with Championship Wrestling from Atlanta, an offshoot of the United Wrestling Network's Championship Wrestling from Hollywood.

Meredith's television station group, Meredith Local Media, was sold to Gray Television on May 3, 2021, for $2.7 billion. Gray was headquartered in Atlanta, and WGCL was regarded as the company's new flagship. The deal coincided with Gray acquiring Third Rail Studios, a film and television production facility located on the site of the former General Motors Doraville Assembly plant in Doraville. Gray then announced a partnership with NBCUniversal to run Third Rail and a major expansion of the Assembly complex slated to be completed in 2023. WKTB-CD, Atlanta's Telemundo affiliate, was then purchased for $30 million; the deal also included boutique digital advertising agency Surge Digital Media.

Modified Peachtree TV logo with slogan, used from March to September 2023.

After assuming control, Gray began a significant expansion of WGCL's news operation, which had a reputation of having the lowest-rated local newscasts in the market with continual executive turnover. WPCH debuted a 7–9 a.m. morning newscast alongside additional newscasts launching on WGCL; by September 2022, WGCL was renamed WANF and all newscasts were rebranded Atlanta News First. WPCH's 9 p.m. news was also expanded to an 8 p.m. start time. As part of a broader brand refresh, general manager Erik Schrader announced the 8 p.m. hour on WPCH would be home to locally-produced programming starting in March 2023, hosted by Atlanta-area creators and influencers.

As part of a larger groupwide contract reached between Gray and Nexstar Media Group, majority owner of The CW, WPCH was announced as the new Atlanta CW affiliate starting September 1, 2023. The switch was necessitated after CBS News and Stations, owner of outgoing CW affiliate WUPA, ended their CW affiliations groupwide following Nexstar's takeover of the network.

On October 1, 2023, Gray launched Peachtree Sports Network (PSN), a regional sports network hosted on digital subchannels of WPCH and other Gray stations across Georgia. By that December, Gray and the Atlanta Hawks agreed to broadcast 10 games during the 2023–24 season over WPCH, primarily on Friday nights; the deal came amid the bankruptcy of rightsholder Bally Sports Southeast's parent company. WPCH had already been carrying games from the College Park Skyhawks, the Hawks' NBA G League affiliate, since 2019. WPCH also simulcast five Hawks games with FanDuel Sports Network Southeast (Note: Renamed from Bally Sports Southeast in October 2024.) during the 2024–25 season. The Braves agreed to a multi-year sublicensing deal with Gray to simulcast 15 regular season games on WPCH and FanDuel Sports Network South starting with the 2025 season; WPCH would also exclusively air 10 spring training games. When the Braves terminated their contract with FanDuel South in January 2026, the team and Gray's Raycom Sports unit partnered to launch BravesVision, with WANF and PSN simulcasting regular season games.

== Technical information ==
=== Subchannels ===
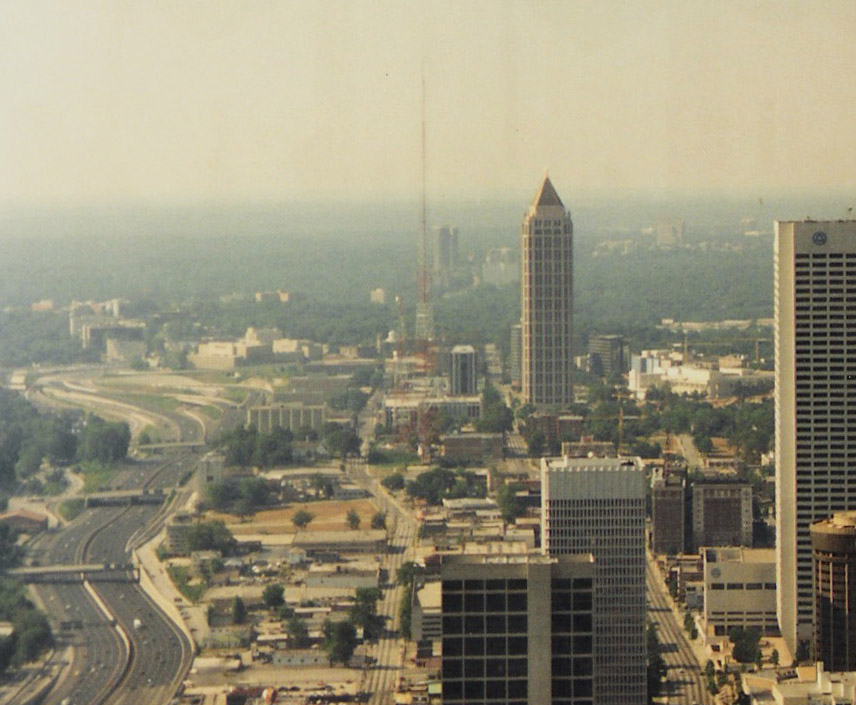
The former WJRJ/WTCG/WTBS lattice tower (center) with One Atlantic Center in the background, c. 1988

WPCH-TV broadcasts from a tower in northeastern Atlanta, near North Druid Hills. The station's ATSC 1.0 channels are carried on the multiplexed signals of other Atlanta television stations:

Subchannels provided by WPCH-TV (ATSC 1.0)
Subchannel	Res.	Short name	Programming	ATSC 1.0 host
17.1	1080i	WPCH-TV	The CW	WANF
17.2	720p	PSN	Peachtree Sports Network	WXIA-TV
17.3	480i	CourtTV	Court TV	WSB-TV
17.4	480i	WPCH-SD	Peachtree TV Canadian feed	WANF

=== Analog-to-digital conversion ===
WPCH-TV shut down its analog signal, over UHF channel 17, on June 12, 2009, as part of the federally mandated transition from analog to digital television. The station's digital signal remained on its pre-transition UHF channel 20, using virtual channel 17. The digital signal has transmitted from North Druid Hills since it launched in 2002; the lattice tower on West Peachtree that housed channel 17's analog transmitter from the beginning was dismantled in November 2010.

WPCH relocated its digital signal from channel 20 to channel 31 on September 6, 2019, as a result of the 2016 United States wireless spectrum auction.

=== ATSC 3.0 lighthouse ===
WPCH-TV converted to the ATSC 3.0 (NextGen TV) standard on August 19, 2021, becoming the ATSC 3.0 host station for itself, WSB-TV, WAGA-TV, WXIA-TV and WGCL-TV.

Subchannels of WPCH-TV (ATSC 3.0)
Subchannel	Res.	Short name	Programming
2.1	1080p	WSB HD	ABC (WSB-TV)
5.1	1080p	WAGA HD	Fox (WAGA-TV)
11.1	1080p	WXIA-TV	NBC (WXIA-TV)
17.1	1080p	WPCH-TV	The CW
46.1	1080p	WANF	Independent (WANF)
46.20	1080p		GameLoop (WANF)

Subchannel broadcast with digital rights management
Subchannel streamed via the Internet

== Bibliography ==
- Bibb, Porter (1993). Ted Turner: It Ain't As Easy as It Looks: The Amazing Story of CNN (1st ed.). New York: Crown Publishers. ISBN 978-1555662035.
- Goldberg, Robert; Goldberg, Gerald Jay (1995). Citizen Turner: The Wild Rise of an American Tycoon. New York: Harcourt Brace & Company. ISBN 0-15-118008-3.
- Williams, Christian (1981). Lead, Follow or Get Out of the Way: The Story of Ted Turner. New York: Times Books. ISBN 978-0812910049.
