= Future Shock (TV series) =

- The Future Shock logo
- Also known as: James Brown's Future Shock
- Genre: Musical variety
- Created by: James Brown
- Directed by: Mike Allen
- Presented by: James Brown
- Theme music composer: James Brown
- Opening theme: "Future Shock (Dance Your Pants Off)"
- Country of origin: United States

Production
- Executive producer: James Brown
- Producers: Al Garner; Fred Daviss
- Production locations: WTCG Studios, Atlanta, Georgia
- Cinematography: Craig Marlowe
- Camera setup: Ron Kirk; Tom Smith; Gary Donatelli; Christ Rehkopf; Ben Butin; Lynn Bateman
- Running time: 44-48 minutes
- Production company: Third World Enterprises

Original release
- Network: WTCG
- Release: September 18, 1975 – September 1, 1979

Future Shock is a television variety show produced and hosted by James Brown from 1975 to 1979. Shot in Augusta and Atlanta, Georgia and broadcast late on Friday nights on the Ted Turner-owned UHF station WTCG, it featured local amateurs performing a variety of popular and emerging dance styles, including disco, locking and popping, and early breakdancing, to prerecorded music. Brown and his musical guests also performed briefly. Other regular features included dance contests, interviews, and segments on African-American history. "Future Shock (Dance Your Pants Off)", a song written by Brown and recorded by Maceo Parker with The J.B.'s, served as the show's nominal theme music, though it was not consistently used.

Following the example of Soul Train, Future Shock was syndicated nationwide in the United States, but it failed to attract sponsors and ceased production within three years. It has not been officially released on recorded media, and with the exception of a handful of episodes recordings of the show have long been presumed lost.
