= Lisa Robinson =

American journalist, author and broadcaster

Lisa Robinson is an American journalist, author and broadcaster. She is currently a contributing editor for Vanity Fair.

== Early life ==
Robinson was born and raised on the Upper West Side of Manhattan and attended the Bronx High School of Science and Syracuse University.

== Career ==
Robinson began her journalism career in 1969 at the suggestion of her husband, who asked her to take over a column he wrote for a British paper. Together, they founded the music magazine Rock Scene in 1973. Robinson went on to write for a variety of publications, including Interview, Creem, Rock Video, the New York Post, and the New Musical Express. She covered various popular artists and bands, including the Rolling Stones, Led Zeppelin, John Lennon, Queen, Michael Jackson, Duran Duran, U2, David Bowie, Chrissie Hynde, the Clash, the Cure and the Who. She also had a syndicated newspaper column, Rock Talk. Robinson heavily covered the punk rock acts playing at the New York City music clubs Max's Kansas City and CBGB in the 1970s, including Iggy Pop and the Stooges, Patti Smith, the Ramones, Television and the New York Dolls. While touring with the Rolling Stones in 1975, Robinson also acted as their press liaison. She hosted the USA Network's Radio 1990 television series (1983—86) and conducted an interview with Freddie Mercury in 1984.

In 1982, Robinson published the novel Walk on Glass. She is also the author of a memoir, There Goes Gravity (2014), about her life as a music journalist, and Nobody Ever Asked Me About the Girls (2020), a book about women in the music industry. Robinson is currently a contributing editor for Vanity Fair.

== Personal life ==
Robinson was married to the late music producer and radio host Richard Robinson.

== Works ==
- Walk on Glass (1982). ISBN 9780517479025
- There Goes Gravity: A Life in Rock and Roll (2014). ISBN 9781594487149
- Nobody Ever Asked Me about the Girls: Women, Music and Fame (2020). ISBN 9781627794909
