= Robert Wussler =

American journalist

Robert J. Wussler
- Born: September 8, 1936; Newark, New Jersey
- Died: June 5, 2010 (aged 73); Westport, Connecticut
- Occupations: Journalist, Executive
- Known for: Executive Producer of CBS News Mercury and Apollo coverage. Executive Producer of Super Bowl X and XII

Robert J. Wussler (September 8, 1936 – June 5, 2010) was a journalist, executive, and co-founder of CNN.

== Early life and education ==
Wussler was born in Newark, New Jersey and attended Seton Hall Preparatory School, then Seton Hall University.

== Career ==
Wussler began his career at CBS in 1957, working in the mailroom. He rose through the ranks to become the youngest president of the network at the age of 40.

Within weeks after joining CBS in 1957, Wussler became a production assistant, eventually rising to be an executive producer and a director of special events. From 1972 until 1974, Wussler served as the general manager of CBS-owned WBBM-TV in Chicago. He returned to CBS headquarters in New York in 1974 as vice president of CBS Sports. He then became the head of the network in 1976. He was forced to leave CBS on the eve of a Federal Communications Commission (FCC) meeting to determine whether to penalize the network for its series of specially promoted tennis matches billed as "winner take all" when, in fact, the players had been paid large fees whether they won or lost. The FCC went on to find that CBS had deliberately misled the public in connection with the players' fees. In July 1978, the FCC announced that it would punish the network by shortening the length of a license renewal for one of the five television stations that CBS owned. Wussler denied having any specific knowledge of the financial arrangements for the tennis series. When he resigned from CBS, he said his departure was unrelated to the inquiry. But in an interview with United Press International in 1986, he said: "There were some people in Washington with the FCC who wanted to get at CBS, and there I was caught in the middle. So I was the fall guy."

In 1978, Wussler formed his own production company, Pyramid Enterprises. Two years later, he joined Ted Turner at Turner Broadcasting in Atlanta, eventually going on to co-found Cable News Network. He also was Executive Producer of Night Tracks from 1983 to 1989 and President of Cable Music Channel in 1984.

From 1989 until 1992, Wussler was Chief Executive Officer of Comsat Video Enterprises, Inc., where he joined with the Metromedia Company as initial investors in a company that eventually became Metromedia International Telecommunications, Inc., developing independent cable television and cellular telephone systems in the former Soviet Union.

From 1992 until his death, Wussler ran the Wussler Group, a consulting company.
