= Radio 1990 =

Music television program

Radio 1990 is a thirty-minute music video showcase program that ran during primetime on weekdays on USA Network. It was intended to compete directly with the NBC program Friday Night Videos, as well as MTV and other cable channel shows such as TBS's Night Tracks. It was a companion to another USA Network program, Night Flight, which featured a combination of music videos, interviews, standup comedy and other performances.

The program ran from March 1983 until September 1986, and was hosted by music journalist Lisa Robinson and Kathryn Kinley. It also featured celebrity musical guest co-hosts. In August 1985, Paul Stanley of Kiss co-hosted for a week and Frank Zappa co-hosted during the week of Halloween 1985.
