= The Now Explosion =

American television series

The Now Explosion was an early experiment in music video produced in Atlanta, Georgia in 1970, more than a decade before MTV was launched. The program was televised in Atlanta on WATL-TV and, later, WTCG-TV (now WPCH-TV).

== History ==
In 1968 and 1969, veteran broadcaster Bob Whitney experimented with a new concept in television programming, in which the hit Top 40 songs of the day were coupled with the latest in the era's videotaping and filming techniques. The resulting pilot enlisted the studio facilities of several stations: WFAA-TV in Dallas, Texas, WHBQ-TV Memphis, Tennessee, WKBS-TV Philadelphia and KMBC-TV in Kansas City. Location scenes were filmed at station studios or at locations within a short distance from these facilities.

Whitney's aim was to create a cost-effective television program that would emulate the success of Top 40 radio, all the way down to the use of an unseen disk jockey. The concept was born about ten years before the arrival of MTV.

In 1970, The Now Explosion began its first regular broadcasts on Atlanta's WATL-TV, where it aired 28 hours each weekend. By this time, the show was produced at WATL's studios.

Programs were bicycled to stations on 2 inch videotape and played back for extended periods from one to six hours. WPIX-TV in New York played five hours of The Now Explosion surrounding telecasts of New York Yankees baseball games in 1970. Stations in Philadelphia, Washington, D.C., San Francisco, Sacramento and Boston had also picked up The Now Explosion.

After 13 weeks at WATL, Ted Turner contracted to carry the program for a television station he had recently acquired, WTCG-TV. WATL closed down shortly afterward. While it was unclear whether or not the show contributed to WATL's viewership, it has been said by some that many of their viewers only watched WATL for The Now Explosion. The move had also shifted production of The Now Explosion to Fort Lauderdale, Florida, where Whitney established a new home production base. Program segments were produced at Miami Teleproductions in Miami and 2 inch video editing was undertaken at Videotape Associates in Ft. Lauderdale (now VTA of Atlanta).

After 26 weeks in syndication in early 1971, Whitney cancelled The Now Explosion, when the high costs of production and distribution outpaced the commercial revenue.

Turner would once again enter the music video television business with the debut of Night Tracks in 1983 which lasted nine years and Cable Music Channel (albeit for only a month) in 1984.

== Special effects ==
The special effects used in The Now Explosion seem crude in later years but they were state of the art for the early 1970s era. Video was shot with heavy, non portable studio cameras on large rolling tripods. The music videos were recorded on two inch magnetic tape. The video editing required the use of three massive and costly "quad" tape recorders allowing only simple transitions such as cuts and dissolves.

Most performers were young amateurs recruited from the Atlanta audience. Many appeared with home-grown costumes - often after midnight when station facilities became available - and were recorded dancing extemporaneously as rock rhythms were piped into an almost bare and darkened studio. The lighting often placed performers "in limbo" so that only the illuminated dancers were seen against darkened studio walls. Extensive special effects were added in post production as images were combined and distorted to form what production people often called "eye candy."

Common special effects included aiming the camera into a monitor that said camera is connected to - a technique called "video feedback." The original video and the newly captured pictures from the monitor were combined with a video switcher to create an "infinity" effect as same video repeated itself in a seemingly endless visual loop. Changes in position or angle of the cameras were used to create trails of light which seemed to spill off dancers in a manner interpreted by many as "psychedelic." Producers felt the distorted video of moving bodies, often seeming to float in space, and moving "in tune" to pop songs, created enhanced enjoyment for viewers.

Other images and effects came from an Atlanta 1960's style light show venture called the "Electric Collage." The Electric Collage production company was popular at major rock concerts and rock festivals. The producers of the Electric Collage visual music were able to produce complex lighting effects with projectors that were not possible using the video technology of the day.

== Archive recovery ==
In 2000, The Walter J. Brown Media Archives and Peabody Awards Archives at University of Georgia in Athens located and recovered significant amounts of this video which had been stored for 3 1/2 decades in south Florida. These segments were remastered to contemporary technical standards by the university archives where the video is stored and is available for public viewing and academic study.

== Sources ==
- Atlanta Journal-Constitution: "Years before MTV, an Atlanta TV show created its own music videos. It was psychedelic. It was far out. It was the. . .'Now Explosion'", August 3, 2000, page F1
- Atlanta Journal-Constitution: "Totally Cool Update: Far-out archives unearthed amid 'Now' reunion", March 30, 2001, page E1
