= Dallas Raines =

American meteorologist

- Born: 1954 (age 71–72)
- Education: Florida State University
- Occupation: Television journalist

Dallas Raines is an American chief meteorologist at KABC-TV in Los Angeles and was also certified by the American Meteorological Society (AMS).

== Biography ==
He received his Bachelor of Science degree from Florida State University where he studied broadcast journalism and earth science with an emphasis on meteorology. Later, Raines taught classes about the weather in the geography department at California State University, Northridge.

Some of his awards include the Daily News People's Choice Award for Best Weatherperson, Man of the Year by the American Cancer Society, Golden Mike Award for Best Weathercast, and Associated Press Award for Best Weather Segment.

Raines was the chief meteorologist for television stations WBRZ-TV in Baton Rouge and at WDSU in New Orleans, Louisiana before moving to CNN to run its national weather coverage. During this time, he also appeared as the weathercaster for the CNN-produced TBS Evening News on what was then SuperStation WTBS (now WPCH-TV). He left CNN to join KABC-TV in 1984 as a meteorologist and then became a weekend evening anchor. Years later, he was shifted to weekday afternoons 4, 5, 6 and 11PM along with David Ono, Ellen Leyva, Marc Brown and (until 2020) Michelle Tuzee.

Dallas and his wife Dannie Raines published a children's weather adventure book titled, "Chester and the Hot Air Balloon," in September 2021.

Raines is popular for his moves during his forecast, such as the "Dallas dip", the swirl, the fist pump and the golf swing.
