= Cable Music Channel =

American television music channel (1984)

- Country: United States
- Broadcast area: Nationwide
- Headquarters: Los Angeles, California

Programming
- Language: English
- Picture format: 480i (SDTV)

Ownership
- Owner: Turner Broadcasting System (1984); Warner-Amex Satellite Entertainment (1984–1985)

History
- Launched: October 26, 1984
- Closed: November 30, 1984 (1 month and 4 days)
- Replaced by: VH1

The Cable Music Channel (CMC) was an American basic cable channel that was owned by the Turner Broadcasting System. The all-music video channel was created by Ted Turner and launched on October 26, 1984, providing the first national competition to MTV.

Turner later stated that the channel was created for the cable industry as an alternative channel airing against MTV's unsuccessful attempts to increase the fees that cable providers paid to carry the channel by twofold; Turner offered the channel without any carriage fees.

After realizing the channel did not have enough cable providers, the channel was sold to Warner-Amex Satellite Entertainment on November 29, 1984, and shut down the following day, making it the shortest lived cable channels to broadcast. Its channel space was then used for relaunch as VH1 in 1985.

== Launch ==
The idea of music on television was nothing new for Ted Turner. In 1970, Turner's Atlanta independent station WTCG-TV (channel 17), aired an all-music program called The Now Explosion at night and on weekends, airing up to 28 hours a week. In 1983, Turner's superstation, which was known as WTBS at the time, launched a late night weekend music video block called Night Tracks. The success of Night Tracks led Turner to create an all-music television channel and complete with MTV called the Cable Music Channel.

CMC launched at 12:00 p.m. Eastern Time on October 26, 1984, with network president Robert Wussler at a lectern in CMC's studios in Los Angeles introducing the network; "The Star-Spangled Banner" was then played (which was a tradition whenever a new Turner-owned network launched; that tradition would eventually be broken when Cartoon Network launched in 1992). Afterwards, Wussler introduced CMC Vice-President and General Manager Scott Sassa to the podium. Sassa greeted the crowd and then introduced 13th District Councilwoman Peggy Stevenson to the podium. Stevenson presented Ted Turner a proclamation from the City of Los Angeles signed by Mayor of Los Angeles Tom Bradley and Stevenson declaring October 26, 1984 as "Cable Music Channel Day." Turner then gave a brief speech stating that the network would "play a wide arrangement of music" and avoid airing videos that feature violence and sexual content towards women that he claimed MTV frequently ran, he then pushed a big red button on the wall behind him and said, "Take that, MTV!". The channel then began programming where CMC VJs Jeff Gonzer and Raechel Donahue introduced the Randy Newman music video "I Love L.A.".

== Differences to MTV ==
MTV focused on album-oriented rock and the VJ segments were pre-recorded; CMC, however, focused on contemporary hit music (which enabled the channel to play soft rock, crossover country, dance, pop, and urban hits) and broadcast live VJ segments. CMC also provided news, sports and weather reports. Another difference between Cable Music Channel and its main competitor was that MTV's video jockeys were seen on-air; whereas CMC's video jockeys were only heard via voiceover. MTV's studios and offices were based in a New York apartment; while CMC's studios were located at The Production Group and offices were located in a Los Angeles house just down the street (as opposed to Atlanta, where the headquarters of Turner Broadcasting System were located).

CMC promoted itself as avoiding sexually and violently explicit music videos to capitalize on the perception that MTV actually played those types of videos. In fact, MTV had strict guidelines about the types of behavior that could be shown in videos and frequently returned clips to record labels for re-editing.

== Sale to Warner-Amex and closure ==
Within several weeks after the channel's launch, it became clear that CMC was losing money quickly, due to an inability to reach agreements with cable providers (many of which did not have the space necessary to carry another all-music channel, and some of which had organized an unofficial boycott at the Western Cable Show in retaliation for Turner's strong-arm tactics in the battle between CNN and the Satellite News Channel) or acquire the rights to play top videos (MTV was accused of pressuring artists not to sell to CMC, citing "exclusivity" agreements). Despite an estimated audience of 2.5 million, on November 29, 1984, Turner decided to sell the assets of Cable Music Channel to MTV's parent company Warner-Amex Satellite Entertainment for $1 million, with Warner-Amex agreeing to buy $500,000 worth of advertising for MTV on Turner's other channels (including CNN). WASEC used the channel (and its space on the Satcom satellite) to help form a new adult contemporary-focused sister network to MTV, VH1 (originally known as Video Hits One, which featured a similar format as CMC), which launched just over a month later on January 1, 1985. VH1, throughout the years, has since shifted towards programming targeting African Americans and aligned with its sister channel BET.

Cable Music Channel officially shut down just before midnight Eastern Time on November 30, 1984; the last chyroned video aired was "Take Me to Heart" by Quarterflash, followed by a sign-off listing the entire crew of CMC interspersed through the video that first launched the network one month earlier, "I Love L.A." by Randy Newman. As the screen faded to black, CMC VJ Raechel Donahue said, "Well, it's not really goodbye, you know, darlings. We'll always be there somewhere, so watch this space. Say 'Goodbye, y'all' now." A male voice (allegedly belonging to a Turner executive sent to ensure CMC signed off as ordered) replied, "Goodbye, y'all." Three seconds later, the satellite uplink was disconnected.

CMC's five-week run made it one of the shortest-lived channels in American cable television history. It was also the shortest-lived service under the umbrella of Turner Broadcasting System until the company's eventual successor, Warner Bros. Discovery, shut down the streaming service CNN+, which lasted five days fewer than CMC, on April 28, 2022. CMC's background graphics were recycled for use on Night Tracks for five years after the channel's closure.

== See also ==
- MTV
- MOR Music TV
- Night Tracks
- Ted Turner
- The Tube Music Network
- VH1
