= The Catlins (TV series) =

- Country of origin: United States
- No. of episodes: 555

Production
- Production company: Procter & Gamble Productions

Original release
- Network: Superstation TBS
- Release: April 4, 1983 – May 31, 1985

The Catlins is an American prime-time soap opera on Superstation TBS that ran from April 4, 1983, to May 31, 1985.

Created by Chris McIntyre, it focuses on the lives of two wealthy and feuding families; the Catlin family and the Quinn family. The show is set in Atlanta, Georgia.

== Overview ==
Catlin family matriarch, Catherine (Mary Nell Santacroce) was widowed. Her son T.J., the head of Catlin Industries, a diversified corporation based in Atlanta and his wife, Annabelle, had five children: sons Matthew, Jonathan and Beau and daughters Jennifer and Maggie. The Quinns were a somewhat evil banking family. Creepy Medgar Quinn had two sons, Seth and Cullen, who were just as bad as their father, and a less evil daughter Eleanor, who was married into the Catlin family, which only served to inflame the rivalry between the families. Her murder only served to cause more trouble between the two families.

The show ended in 1985, after 555 episodes. One of the show's more famous alumni was Lisby Larson (she played villainous Vanessa Crane) who went on to play Calla Matthews on Guiding Light not long after The Catlins ended its run in 1985. Actress Dana Ivey is the daughter of the show's star, Mary Nell Santacroce (Catherine Catlin).
