= Night Tracks =

American music television program

- Genre: Music program
- Created by: Thomas W. Lynch; Gary P. Biller
- Narrated by: (see article)
- Theme music composer: Jerry Kaywell (1983–85); Dale Herigstad (1983–85); Michael Cruz (1985–92)
- Country of origin: United States
- Original language: English
- No. of seasons: 12

Production
- Executive producers: Robert Wussler (1983–89); Thomas W. Lynch (1989–92); Gary P. Biller (1989–92)
- Producers: Thomas W. Lynch (1983–89); Gary P. Biller (1983–89); H.B. Barnum, III (1989–91); Heath Adams (1991–92)
- Running time: ~3 hours (1983–89); ~2½ hours (1989–90); ~90 minutes (1990–92)
- Production companies: Night Tracks, Inc.; Lynch/Biller Productions (1983–91); Lynch Entertainment (1991–92)

Original release
- Network: TBS / WTBS
- Release: June 3, 1983 – May 30, 1992

Night Tracks is an American music video television program that aired on TBS in late night on Fridays and Saturdays from June 3, 1983 to May 30, 1992. Created and produced by Thomas W. Lynch and Gary Biller through Night Tracks, Inc. (a production label of Lynch/Biller Productions until 1991, and successor Lynch Entertainment thereafter) and distributed by Turner Program Services, the program was developed to capitalize on the burgeoning popularity of the music video medium after MTV helped bring it into the mainstream following its launch in August 1981.

The series was one of several music video showcase programs that made their debut on American broadcast and cable television during the 1980s in the wake of MTV's rise into the pop culture zeitgeist, including two others that premiered in 1983: NBC's Friday Night Videos and USA Network's Radio 1990.

== Programming ==
Night Tracks produced shows were (in chronological order):

=== Night Tracks (1983–1992) ===
Night Tracks was the main program, composed (until 1989) of two three-hour blocks of music videos. The first music video aired on the program was for Hall & Oates's "Family Man" (from their H2O album) during the inaugural Friday night edition on June 3, 1983. On Fridays, the program normally began at 12:05 a.m. Eastern Time/9:05 p.m. Pacific Time and ran through the night until 6:00 a.m. ET/3:00 a.m. PT. On Saturdays, the two blocks were repeated, but in reverse order. (This was done partly to accommodate Atlanta Braves baseball and NBA basketball games that often overran into the Night Tracks timeslot; on those nights, Night Tracks would end before the entirety of the second block had been aired.)

Interest in music videos began to wane in the late 1980s. USA Network cancelled its Radio 1990 video program in 1986; MTV suffered a ratings slump that same year that led it to replace its original crew of video jockeys and begin creating non-music programs; and in the summer of 1987, Friday Night Videos was pushed back an hour to accommodate the addition of a Friday episode of the higher-rated Late Night with David Letterman. In 1989, TBS began cutting back the amount of airtime devoted to music videos; that March, the Friday night schedule comprised one hour of Power Play (see below) and one three-hour block of videos, beginning at 1:00 a.m. ET/10:00 p.m. PT. TBS assigned the three hours cut from the video block to live sports events on Friday evenings and reruns of Hogan's Heroes and Gomer Pyle, U.S.M.C. early Saturday mornings. That August, TBS reduced Night Tracks to 2½ hours on Fridays, and Chartbusters (see below) plus two two-hour-long blocks on Saturdays, while the remaining hours each night were repurposed for Night Flicks (which were simply a double-feature presentation of movies, standard TBS evening fare, with the Night Tracks theme music and announcer introducing the commercial breaks). In the spring of 1990, it was further reduced to two 90-minute blocks. (This meant that it was possible to see the first 90-minute block again—albeit in abbreviated form just before the cut-off time—on the same night.)

In the spring of 1991, Night Tracks introduced "College Crush Groove", two 30-minute blocks of alternative music videos in addition to two one-hour blocks of the customary top 40 videos. The next August, Night Tracks became wholly devoted to alternative and rap, adopting the slogan "The Music That Matters". However, the ratings did not significantly improve. TBS replaced more of Night Tracks' airtime with the now-renamed Nite Flix on May 15, 1992 and eventually cancelled Night Tracks altogether. The final episode of the main show aired on Friday, May 29, 1992, albeit in an abbreviated 40-minute airing that had its originally scheduled timeslot overrun into by an Atlanta Braves–New York Mets baseball telecast, while the only program that aired on the night of Saturday, May 30, 1992 was New Alternative Express.

=== America's Music Tracks (1983–1984) ===
Following Night Tracks' success, WTBS launched a one-hour, country music-oriented version with different voiceover announcers (though the same chyron font for music video identification was used). It premiered on Sunday, October 2, 1983 at 8:05 p.m. ET/5:05 p.m. PT. The show ran for 15 weeks before it was canceled in February 1984.

=== Chartbusters (1984–1991) ===
Chartbusters was an hour-long Top 10 (changed to Top 20 in 1990) music video countdown show airing Saturday nights preceding Night Tracks. It premiered on May 19, 1984, and its chart listing was provided by Kal Rudman's Friday Morning Quarterback. It also aired an additional BREAKER video that was predicted to hit the charts in the following weeks.

=== Power Play (1985–1988) ===
Power Play was an hour of top-ranking music videos airing Friday nights preceding Night Tracks. It premiered on October 4, 1985, and brought in a peak of 14 hours of music videos that aired each weekend.

=== Power Play Dancin' (1988–1989) ===
Power Play Dancin' was an hour-long Top 10 dance video block which replaced Power Play.

=== Power Hits (1989–1990) ===
Power Hits was an hour of hard rock music videos which replaced Power Play Dancin'. It was canceled in February 1990, and nothing music-related was put in its place.

=== Night Flicks (1989–1991) ===
Night Flicks was a two-hour movie presentation (a different movie on Friday and Saturday) that used the Night Tracks theme music. The name Night Flicks had originated on Night Tracks as a movie trailer commercial segment. Over time, it replaced most of Night Tracks, and the title was changed to Nite Flix in 1991; under this name, it lasted into 1994.

=== New Alternative Express (1991–1992) ===
New Alternative Express was an hour-long Top 10 alternative video block, replacing Chartbusters. Its final episode aired on Saturday, May 30, 1992 (early morning Sunday, May 31 in most time zones) and officially signaled the end of the Night Tracks franchise.

== Night Tracks DJs ==
This list includes permanent announcers, a.k.a. the DJs of Night Tracks only, and not fill-in announcers such as Bill Brummel and others.

- Bob Coburn (1983–1986): later hosted the national call-in radio show Rockline and also at KLOS; died on December 17, 2016
- Joanne Ehrhart (Kreindel) (1983–1989)
- Frazer Smith (1986–1988, 1989–1991)
- Mike Carruthers (1988–1989): currently hosting Something You Should Know
- Cynthia Fox (1989–1991): formerly at KSWD
- Phillip Philistine (1991–1992)
- Nile Fair (1991–1992)
- Heath Adams (1992)

The announcers' faces were never seen except during a special year-end show in 1991. During a typical edition, they would mention artists and music videos that would be aired within the hour. They would also mention facts and information about the artists just before the videos were aired. The announcers were also heard in these segments during the show:

- "The Night Tracks' New Music Video of the Week"
- "The Night Tracks' New Music Spotlight" (changed to "The Night Tracks' New Music Preview" in 1989) – Highlighting a new artist to Night Tracks just before that artist's debut video is aired.
- "The Night Tracks' Original Classic" – A classic music video is aired with info on that artist.
- "The Night Tracks' World Premiere" – Occasionally Night Tracks would have the privilege of being the first to air a particular music video. The announcers would thank the people at the record company for the arrangement.
- "The Night Tracks' Inside Track" – A short one-question interview segment just before that artist's video is aired.

=== Celebrity guest Night Tracks VJs ===
- Pet Shop Boys (November 1988)
- Taylor Dayne (December 1988)

== See also ==
- Cable Music Channel
- The Tube Music Network
