= WXIA-TV =

Television station in Atlanta

- Atlanta, Georgia; United States
- Channels: Digital: 10 (VHF); Virtual: 11
- Branding: 11 Alive

Programming
- Affiliations: 11.1: NBC; for others, see § Subchannels

Ownership
- Owner: Tegna Inc., a subsidiary of Nexstar Media Group; (Pacific and Southern, LLC)
- Sister stations: WATL

History
- First air date: September 30, 1951
- Former call signs: WLTV (1951–1953); WLWA (1953–1962); WAII-TV (1962–1968); WQXI-TV (1968–1973)
- Former channel number: Analog: 8 (VHF, 1951–1953), 11 (VHF, 1953–2009)
- Former affiliations: ABC (1951–1980)
- Call sign meaning: "XI" is the Roman numeral for "11"; Atlanta

Technical information
- Licensing authority: FCC
- Facility ID: 51163
- ERP: 80 kW
- HAAT: 303 m (994 ft)
- Transmitter coordinates: 33°45′24″N 84°19′55″W
- Translator(s): WATL 11.11 Atlanta

Links
- Public license information: Public file; LMS
- Website: www.11alive.com

WXIA-TV (channel 11) is a television station in Atlanta, Georgia, United States, affiliated with NBC. It is owned by the Tegna subsidiary of Nexstar Media Group alongside WATL (channel 36), an independent station with MyNetworkTV. The two stations share studios at One Monroe Place on the north end of midtown Atlanta; WXIA-TV's transmitter is located in the city's east section, near Kirkwood. Atlanta is the second largest television market (after KPRC-TV in Houston) where the NBC station is not owned and operated by the network.

WXIA-TV is popularly known within the Atlanta metropolitan area by its longtime on-air brand, 11 Alive, which the station has used since 1976.

== History ==
What is known today as WXIA-TV originally signed on the air September 30, 1951, at 5 p.m., as WLTV on VHF channel 8. It was the first full time ABC affiliate for Atlanta, taking it over from WSB-TV and WAGA-TV (channel 5), both originally primary NBC and CBS affiliates respectively that previously shared ABC programming as a secondary affiliation. It was the third Atlanta television station to sign-on after WSB-TV and WAGA, all signing on within a three-year time frame.

Owned and operated by a group of Atlanta businessmen organized as Broadcasting, Inc., WLTV was indirectly born from the 1950 merger of Atlanta's two newspapers. The Atlanta Journal had originally owned channel 8 as WSB-TV, while The Atlanta Constitution held a construction permit for channel 2 as WCON-TV. Construction had already begun on the WCON-TV facilities when the Howell family, longtime owners of the Constitution, sold their paper to Cox Enterprises, owners of the Journal. However, Cox had a problem. At the time, the Federal Communications Commission (FCC) did not permit the sale of television station construction permits, considering it "trafficking". Cox had little option but to keep the WCON-TV construction permit rather than the already-operating WSB-TV. As such, it announced plans to move the WSB-TV intellectual unit to the stronger channel 2 facility when it was completed and sell its channel 8 license, which was acquired by Broadcasting, Inc., for $525,000. The sale was challenged by applicants for additional stations that were affected by the then-ongoing freeze on new construction permits, including Georgia Tech (owners of WGST radio) and Decatur radio station owner E.D. Rivers, in part because planned allocation changes meant that there would be no further commercial VHF stations for Atlanta, and they sought to operate the channel as well.

The FCC dismissed the complaints and approved the sale of the channel 8 license to Broadcasting, Inc., in August 1951. Testing for the new channel 2 began on September 25, 1951, and WSB-TV moved there on September 30. Channel 8 returned at 5 p.m. that day as WLTV. Due to the way the transfer was structured legally, WXIA operates under the license originally granted to WSB-TV, while the current WSB-TV license dates from 1951. Thus, the present-day channel 11 is the second-oldest broadcasting facility in the South; WSB-TV signed on in 1948, four months after WTVR-TV in Richmond, Virginia.

Several more large changes would come for WLTV in the years that followed. When the FCC lifted its freeze on new TV stations with the Sixth Report and Order in April 1952, it made several changes to television allocations and substituted channel 11 for 8 at Atlanta, modifying WLTV's license to specify channel 11. The change coincided with the reallocation of channel 8 to non-commercial educational use at Athens and mitigated interference with channel 9 at Rome. The station would not change channels until September 1953, by which time Broadcasting, Inc., had sold WLTV to Cincinnati-based Crosley Broadcasting Corporation for $1.5 million. In line with its other television stations, Crosley changed the call letters to WLWA (often rendered as "WLW-A") on March 3, 1953.

In 1962, WLWA was purchased by Indianapolis businessman Richard Fairbanks, via his WIBC, Inc., as part of a settlement between Crosley and Fairbanks. Crosley had started WLWI (now WTHR) in Indianapolis in 1957, but Fairbanks insisted that the last VHF allocation in Indianapolis should go to a local owner. Eventually, the two companies agreed to what amounted to a trade, in which Crosley kept WLWI while Fairbanks bought WLWA. The Atlanta station's call sign then became WAII-TV, using the slogan "The Eyes of Atlanta" and the calls standing for "Atlanta's 11" (II). The station was sold to Pacific & Southern Broadcasting in 1968 and on March 23 became known as WQXI-TV, aligning it with WQXI AM and FM (the calls had originally been used on channel 36, currently WATL, from 1954 to 1955). Pacific & Southern later merged with Combined Communications Corporation; the merged company could not purchase both WQXI radio and television, as the FCC had barred new radio-television combinations in top 50 markets. The radio stations were sold to Jefferson-Pilot Broadcasting; as a result of the split, the station assumed the WXIA-TV call letters on December 24, 1973.

On September 20, 1976, WXIA first adopted "11 Alive" as its on-air branding, as part of Combined's practice of using the word "Alive" as part of the brand of most of their stations (two stations not owned by Combined also adopted the "11 Alive" branding that same year, then-independent station WPIX (now a CW affiliate) in New York City—which used the brand until 1986, and NBC affiliate WIIC in Pittsburgh, now WPXI—which used it until 1979). In 1979, Combined merged with the Gannett Company in what became the largest media merger in history up to that time. Following the acquisition, most of the former Combined stations stopped using the "Alive" brand, though WXIA continued to call itself "11 Alive".

On September 1, 1980, WXIA swapped affiliations with WSB-TV and became an NBC affiliate. This move could be traced to ratings: NBC slid to a very poor third place; meanwhile, ABC was in first place for most of the late 1970s and was seeking out affiliates with higher viewership in many markets, including Atlanta. ABC thus jumped at the chance to affiliate with longtime market leader WSB-TV. Some network daytime programs switched stations in August, before the full affiliation switch occurred. In 1993, Gannett dropped the "11 Alive" moniker as part of the introduction of new on-air graphics for its newscasts and promos; however, the brand was so well established in Atlanta that viewer outcry forced Gannett to restore it after only a month; even so, the "11 Alive" brand was not fully restored until 1996, when the 11 Alive News title was restored for its newscasts (which were retitled 11 News with the removal of the "11 Alive" brand).

On June 5, 2006, Gannett entered into an agreement to purchase WATL from the Tribune Company for $180 million, creating Atlanta's first television duopoly; the sale was finalized on August 7, 2006. WATL occasionally airs NBC programs when WXIA is not able due to extended breaking news and severe weather coverage, or special programming. As a result of the WATL acquisition, WXIA management decided to house the combined operation at WATL's facility at One Monroe Place, leaving WXIA's longtime studios at 1611 West Peachtree Street; WXIA and WATL began broadcasting from the new studios on July 27, 2008.

On June 29, 2015, the Gannett Company split in two, with one side specializing in print media and the other side specializing in broadcast and digital media. WXIA and WATL were retained by the latter company, named Tegna.

On January 24, 2019, WXIA debuted a new station logo for the first time in 26 years; the "11" in the new logo is similar to Louisville sister station WHAS-TV.

Nexstar Media Group acquired Tegna in a deal announced in August 2025 and completed on March 19, 2026.

== Programming ==
The station previously aired a program called Noonday for many years, beginning with the news at noon and at 12:30 continuing on for the rest of the hour with features, akin somewhat to the Today Show. This program was canceled in 1997, but the half-hour noon newscast was preceded by the hour-long Atlanta & Company, a program which has some similar features, but is partly paid for by the companies featured on it, until 2015, when the noon newscast was canceled. The program then expanded to 90 minutes, currently running from 11 to 12:30 p.m.

=== Sports programming ===
Owing to NBC's longstanding contract with the International Olympic Committee, WXIA was the local broadcaster for the 1996 Summer Olympics held in Atlanta. It also carried the Atlanta Braves' World Series victory the previous year (coverage alternated between NBC and ABC as part of The Baseball Network, so WSB had Games 1, 4 and 5, while WXIA received Games 2, 3 and the clinching sixth game; all Braves games on NBC's MLB broadcast contract from 1981 to 1989 (and before that, from 1976 to 1980 with ABC's broadcast contract) and postseason games in select years from 1996 to 2000 were also broadcast on WXIA which include their 1999 World Series appearance). WXIA also aired a Braves game in 2023 as part of a simulcast between NBC and Peacock's MLB Sunday Leadoff package. From its switch to NBC in 1980 up to 1997, all Atlanta Falcons involving them playing an AFC team at home were aired on WXIA. Today, the station airs any Falcons contests under NBC's Sunday Night Football banner (afternoon games air either on WAGA or WUPA). The station also provided local coverage of Super Bowl XXVIII, which was hosted at the Georgia Dome. WXIA also aired all Atlanta Hawks games carried through NBC's NBA coverage from 1990 to 2002, and from 2025 onward.

=== News operation ===
WXIA presently broadcasts 41 hours, 55 minutes of locally produced newscasts each week (with 7 hours, 5 minutes each weekday; 3 1/2 hours on Saturdays and three hours on Sundays). It also produces a half-hour prime time newscast at 10 p.m. and morning newscasts for sister station WATL; the 10 p.m. show competes with the longer-running hour-long newscast on Fox-owned WAGA-TV. The station's Doppler weather radar site is located west of Atlanta in far southern Cobb County, south-southwest of Mableton, on the south side of Interstate 20 not far west of Six Flags Over Georgia.

The station began calling its newscasts News Watch in 1963 and began broadcasting news in color for the first time on March 20, 1967. From the early 1970s onward, channel 11's newscasts waged a spirited battle with WAGA for second place behind long-dominant WSB-TV. When WAGA switched to Fox in 1994, WXIA surged to become a solid runner-up, usually finishing well ahead of perennial third-place finisher WGCL-TV; however, by May 2009, WXIA's ratings had been surpassed by WGCL at noon and 11 p.m. The morning news program Today in Atlanta had experienced a 40% ratings drop, leaving them a very distant third behind the local morning shows on WSB and WAGA, and sometimes fourth behind WGCL.

WXIA formerly had a partnership with The Weather Channel to use their weather forecasters and provide local weather forecasts (incidentally, NBCUniversal—which owns NBC through parent company Comcast, Atlanta's primary cable television provider—held a majority ownership stake in The Weather Channel until 2018). WXIA became the first Atlanta station to begin broadcasting its local newscasts in high definition on February 2, 2006. As part of the conversion to HD, a new HD-ready news set from Production Design Group, Ltd. was built and the station began using a new graphics package from Giant Octopus.

In February 2010, WXIA began a nightly news segment, "Bull Fighters", which consists of eight reporters/anchors; the segment is usually provided by former WAGA sports reporter Jeff Hullinger. On April 28, 2010, a new 4:30 a.m. newscast called Wake Up with Chesley debuted, featuring meteorologist Chesley McNeil and travel producer Matt Holmes; in addition to news updates throughout the show, McNeil primarily gives weather updates while Holmes gives travel delays and information. On January 29, 2013, on the noon broadcast, WXIA debuted the new Gannett standardized graphics and music ("This is Home" by Gari Media Group); their renovated studio debuted on February 12, 2013.

On January 29, 2015, WXIA announced that the 5 p.m. newscast would return for the first time since 2003, when Dr. Phil took over that time slot; that show moved to the 3 p.m. timeslot. However, the new newscast came at the cost of ending its noon and 7 p.m. newscasts, which were replaced by an extension of Atlanta & Company and Wheel of Fortune, respectively (the latter reversing its 2007 move from WXIA to WATL). These changes went into effect on March 2, 2015.

Between July 31 and August 28, 2017, WXIA underwent a significant relaunch of its news department, mirroring a similar move that was made by Tampa Bay sister station WTSP in April of that same year. The station renamed its morning and late-night newscasts as Morning Rush ATL and The Late Feed, respectively. Shiba Russell, who came over from NBC O&O station WNBC the previous year, became the solo anchor of Morning Rush ATL, while Vinnie Politan became the anchor of The Late Feed.

In March 2020, WXIA relaunched its noon newscast; however, it was meant to be temporary due to the COVID-19 pandemic.

In June 2021, WXIA re-titled its morning and late-night newscasts once again; the former is now titled 11 Alive Morning News and the latter, which had been renamed from The Late Feed to Up Late following Vinnie Politan's departure from the station in November 2018, returned to the previous 11 Alive News at 11 title.

==== Notable former on-air staff ====
- Roz Abrams – anchor/reporter (1972–1980)
- Renee Chenault-Fattah – anchor/reporter (1989–1991)
- Jim Huber – weekend sports anchor (1970s–1984)
- Jeff Hullinger – co-anchor and sports director (2010–2023)
- Walt Maciborski – anchor/reporter
- Steve McCoy – Noonday co-host (1990–1992)
- Steen Miles – reporter
- Demarco Morgan – anchor/reporter (2012–2015)
- Stone Phillips – reporter (1978–1979)
- Vinnie Politan – The Late Feed anchor (August 28, 2017–November 2, 2018)
- Del Rodgers – sports anchor/reporter (1986–1997)
- Steve Somers – sports anchor/reporter (1976–1978)
- Tom Sullivan – Atlanta & Company co-host (2007–2009)
- Harmon Wages – sports anchor/reporter (1979–1984)

== Technical information ==
=== Subchannels ===
The station's signal is multiplexed:

Subchannels of WXIA-TV
Subchannel	Res.	Short name	Programming
11.1	1080i	WXIA-TV	NBC
11.3	480i	Crime	True Crime Network
11.4	480i	NEST	The Nest
11.5	480i	OXYGEN	Oxygen
11.7	480i	GetTV	Great
17.2	720p	PSN	Peachtree Sports Network (WPCH-TV)

Broadcast on behalf of another station

The NBC Weather Plus service was discontinued on December 1, 2008; however, some stations, including WXIA, continued to air national and local radar with Weather Plus branding, supplied by The Weather Channel through the end of December. In January, WXIA rebranded the channel "11Alive Weather" and kept the "L-Bar" with weather information from The Weather Channel, but shifted the remainder of the content to a local radar loop, and eliminated the background music that aired with it. It was later rebranded as the "11Alive Weather Information Zone" or "WIZ" in 2010, along with the weather segments during newscasts on the main channel. This service was also carried on digital cable in the Atlanta area through Charter Spectrum and Comcast.

In early December 2010, the WIZ was moved to WATL, and aired on channel 36.2, while 11.2 continued to air a static message graphic directing over-the-air viewers to tune there and re-scan if necessary. One month later, on January 10, the channel was removed completely from WXIA, and 11.3 became 11.2, before being reversed the following day. In 2011, Atlanta-based Bounce TV launched on September 26 with WATL 36.2 as its de facto flagship affiliate, with the WIZ channel being restored two weeks later on 36.3. In early October, 11.2 again became Universal Sports and 11.3 was deleted and was reversed again a week later, with WIZ bounced back to its original channel 11.2. In November 2011, 11.3 was deleted leaving 36.3 as the sole channel for Universal Sports until it became a cable channel in 2012. Eventually, WIZ was converted from being presented using internal station weather computers to presentation and programming from The Local AccuWeather Channel. But an agreement with WAGA-TV and AccuWeather has made WXIA switch its programming and presentation to WeatherNation TV.

The station added Universal Sports at the beginning of May 2009 on channel 11.3, added it to 36.3 in October 2011, and then deleted it from 11.3 in November 2011. However, it used severe video data compression, which left very obvious blurriness and pixelation during high-motion scenes common in sports. This low-bitrate sacrifice protects the quality of the main HD channel and is unavoidable because Universal Sports transmits its programming via satellite in this highly compressed form (4.48 Mbit/s). It was therefore not originally transmitted on sister station WATL (virtual channel 36.3, digital channel 25) because it would look the same there, and that station's bandwidth is being used for mobile television (ATSC-M/H), including WXIA's mobile channels. Additionally, mobile communications work better on higher UHF TV channels than on low VHF ones.

In early 2018, the station added new network Quest on new subchannel 11.4, taking over many of WXIA-DT2's cable slots and leaving that station for the most part exclusive to over-the-air customers.

In February 2020, WeatherNation TV was replaced by a VHF simulcast of WATL on subchannel 11.2. The simulcast ended on April 5, 2021, when it was replaced with Twist after the network launched.

=== Analog-to-digital conversion ===
WXIA-TV originally had the only VHF allotment for digital television in the area, until WGTV (channel 8) was moved from UHF 22 to VHF 12 (now 8). The station shut down its analog signal, over VHF channel 11, on June 12, 2009, at 12:30 p.m., as part of the federally mandated transition from analog to digital television. The station's digital signal remained on its pre-transition VHF channel 10, using virtual channel 11.

== See also ==
- Channel 10 digital TV stations in the United States
- Channel 11 virtual TV stations in the United States
- WQXI (AM)
- WROM-TV
- WSTR (FM)
