= WATL =

Television station in Atlanta

- Atlanta, Georgia; United States
- Channels: Digital: 25 (UHF); Virtual: 36
- Branding: The ATL

Programming
- Affiliations: 36.1: Independent with MyNetworkTV; for others, see § Subchannels

Ownership
- Owner: Tegna Inc., a subsidiary of Nexstar Media Group; (Pacific and Southern, LLC)
- Sister stations: WXIA-TV

History
- First air date: December 18, 1954
- Former call signs: WQXI-TV (1954–1956); WATL-TV (1956–1985)
- Former channel number: Analog: 36 (UHF, 1954–2009)
- Former affiliations: Independent (1954–1955, 1969–1971, 1976–1986, 1994–1995); Dark (1955–1969, 1971–1976); FNN (1981–1985); Fox (1986–1994); Fox Kids (secondary, 1994–2000); The WB (1995–2006)
- Call sign meaning: Atlanta, also the IATA code for Hartsfield–Jackson Atlanta International Airport

Technical information
- Licensing authority: FCC
- Facility ID: 22819
- ERP: 500 kW
- HAAT: 332 m (1,089 ft)
- Transmitter coordinates: 33°48′26.4″N 84°20′21.5″W

Links
- Public license information: Public file; LMS

WATL (channel 36) is a television station in Atlanta, Georgia, United States. It is programmed primarily as an independent station, but maintains a secondary affiliation with MyNetworkTV. WATL is owned by the Tegna subsidiary of Nexstar Media Group alongside NBC affiliate WXIA-TV (channel 11) and the two stations share studios at One Monroe Place on the north end of midtown Atlanta. WATL's transmitter shares a broadcast tower with several other local stations near North Druid Hills, just northeast of the city.

== History ==
=== Early history ===
In the fall of 1952, Robert Rounsaville, the owner of radio station WQXI (790 AM) in Atlanta, applied for a construction permit to build the first UHF station in the city on channel 36, which was granted on November 19, 1953. The station began test broadcasts on October 13, 1954. On October 26, the Federal Communications Commission (FCC) granted a special temporary authority to begin commercial operation under the call sign WQXI-TV. Actual full-time programming began on December 18, 1954, as Atlanta's fourth television station. Rounsaville also had construction permits for UHF stations in Louisville, Kentucky (WQXL-TV), and Cincinnati, Ohio (WQXN-TV), which were never placed in operation. An article on the history of WQXI-TV relates how the station shared a house in the northeast Atlanta area of Buckhead at 3165 Mathieson Drive with WQXI radio. In addition, the programming included old movies, live interview shows, a Saturday-evening barn dance and a live bingo game show. Because expensive UHF converters were required, the station could not attract enough viewers to make it successful; as a result, WQXI-TV signed off on May 31, 1955, after less than six months on the air. (The WQXI call sign was later used on channel 11, now-sister station WXIA-TV, from 1968 to 1974.) Despite being off the air, the call letters were changed to WATL-TV in early 1956.

On August 17, 1964, the FCC announced that an application had been filed to transfer the WATL-TV construction permit from Robert Rounsaville to Daniel H. Overmyer for a price of $100,000; FCC approval of the transfer was granted on May 12, 1965. At the time of the FCC sale approval, Overmyer owned construction permits for two UHF stations, WDHO-TV in Toledo and WNOP-TV in Cincinnati. In addition, he was in the process of buying existing construction permits for two other UHF stations in San Francisco (KBAY-TV, channel 20) and Pittsburgh (WAND-TV, channel 53), as well as applying for new UHF stations in Houston and Dallas. Neither of the Overmyer-owned stations had signed on by the time of the FCC approval of the channel 36 purchase. Under Overmyer, the station permit bore the call letters WBMO-TV, for his daughter, Barbara Morton Overmyer; it was to have been one of the owned-and-operated stations of the new Overmyer Network, (later United Network), which folded at the end of May 1967 after only a single month of broadcasting.

Channel 36 would remain dark until the station was relaunched on August 16, 1969, having returned to the WATL-TV call letters. It was jointly owned by the U.S. Communications Corporation station group of Philadelphia, a subsidiary of AVC, holding an 80 percent interest and the remaining 20% by Overmyer. Overmyer had previously sold the majority interest (80%) in the construction permits for Atlanta, Cincinnati, San Francisco, Pittsburgh and Houston to AVC on March 28, 1967, with FCC approval of their sale coming December 8, 1967. None of the stations were on the air at the time of their sale to AVC, but U.S. built all but one: WATL-TV, WXIX-TV, KEMO-TV and WPGH-TV, in addition to owning Philadelphia's WPHL-TV. The Houston station (KJDO-TV) was never constructed; the permit was deleted by the FCC in October 1971.

U.S. Communications reportedly spent $1 million on programming in the first year, including Lost in Space and a block of dinnertime game shows. Ted Turner's WTCG (channel 17, later WTBS and now WPCH-TV), which had been operating two years longer, spent far less on programming and survived. WATL was also the first station in the country to run music videos all weekend, on a show called The Now Explosion.

On March 24, 1971, Frank Minner Jr., the president of U.S. Communications Corporation, announced at an Atlanta press conference that, due to low advertising revenue, WATL-TV (and KEMO-TV) would go off the air on March 31. The last full broadcast day was March 31, 1971, and the station signed off in the early morning hours of April 1. For about a week before it left the air, the station ran :30-second announcements with a photograph of its studios at 1810 Briarcliff Road. Turner's first move after acquiring WTCG, the UHF station that would serve as the foundation of his media empire, was to take The Now Explosion from WATL.

In July 1971, U.S. Communications Corporation put WATL-TV and KEMO-TV up for sale.

=== Stability, then transition from independent station to Fox ===
On July 17, 1974, two and a half years after filing to buy the station, the Briarcliff Communications Group received FCC approval to purchase the construction permit for WATL-TV from U.S. Communications Corporation for $23,500. Briarcliff Communications was partially owned (30.5%) by Don Kennedy, a well-known broadcaster in Atlanta; Kennedy started WKLS-FM in the early 1960s and also the Georgia News Network, providing statewide news to radio stations. He was also the host known as Officer Don of the children's TV show The Popeye Club on WSB-TV from 1956 until switching the show to Officer Don's Club House on WATL-TV in 1969. On July 5, 1976, Kennedy returned channel 36 to the air for good. The existing transmitter facilities were used, but the studios were now located at 1800 Peachtree Road, rather than the previous Briarcliff Road location.

Channel 36 ran public domain movies, financial news, low-budget local shows, religious programs, and a blend of CBS, NBC and ABC shows pre-empted from WAGA-TV, WSB-TV and WXIA-TV, respectively. One popular local program in 1976–77 was The Kids' Show with Otis, where segments featuring a puppet named Otis, played by a teenaged puppeteer named Steve Whitmire, played as interstitials between public-domain black-and-white cartoons. Whitmire's work on the show won him an audition with Jim Henson and led to a nearly four-decade-long career with the Muppet organization, playing iconic characters such as Rizzo the Rat, Bean Bunny, Wembley Fraggle, and (after Henson's death in 1990) Kermit the Frog and Ernie. The station also made a brief venture into subscription television with a trial in late 1980 and early 1981, but it opted not to move forward after the trial.

The station introduced several program changes, including daily business programming from the Financial News Network, in late 1981, but financial difficulties caused Briarcliff to search for a buyer. In 1982, the station was sold to Sillerman Morrow Broadcasting, an owner of radio stations formed by Robert F. X. Sillerman and Bruce "Cousin Brucie" Morrow. In the fall of 1983, WATL moved toward a more traditional independent schedule with a couple cartoons, a few westerns, and a few classic sitcoms plus more movies. Then in 1984, the station was sold again, this time to Outlet Communications; the sale closed in early 1985, having been intentionally delayed to allow buyer and seller to take advantage of new tax breaks. Gradually, WATL acquired stronger programming such as Cheers, Webster, and Family Ties, as well as newer syndicated cartoons as these became abundant by 1985. Outlet also built new studios for the station. Even though competing independent WGNX (channel 46, now WANF) billed more than twice WATL in 1986, it was WATL that became one of the charter affiliates of the newly launched Fox Broadcasting Company on October 9, 1986. All of this upgrading left the station $65 million in debt by 1989, $43 million of which was already on the books when Outlet purchased the station.

Outlet continued to own the station until 1989, when Outlet sold WATL, along with WXIN in Indianapolis, to Chase Broadcasting for $120 million. By then, the station was called "Fox 36". In 1992, WATL and WXIN were included in Chase's merger with Renaissance Communications. Less than a year later, WATL was sold to Fox Television Stations outright and channel 36 became a Fox owned-and-operated station—the first network-owned station in Atlanta. Fox was in the planning stages for a news department at the station, and WATL had even gone as far as hiring a news director. However, on May 22, 1994, New World Communications announced an affiliation agreement with Fox, months after the network won the broadcast rights to the NFL's National Football Conference. In this deal, most of New World-owned longtime "Big Three"-affiliated stations, including Atlanta's longtime CBS affiliate WAGA, would switch over to the Fox network. As a result, Fox canceled the plans for a newscast on WATL and put the station up for sale.

CBS, which was losing WAGA as an affiliate, made an offer to buy WATL, but backed out after Fox demanded $120 million, far more than CBS was willing to spend on the soon-to-be independent station. At that point, it almost seemed likely that WATL would join the soon-to-launch United Paramount Network (UPN) in early 1995. Rival station WGNX, then owned by Tribune Broadcasting was already slated to join The WB and had turned CBS down, forcing CBS to make a deal to buy WVEU. Eventually, however, Tribune agreed to let WGNX join CBS, and WVEU became the UPN affiliate.

=== Changing affiliations and owners ===
Fox programming moved from WATL to WAGA on December 11, 1994, with WATL briefly reverting to an independent station under the branding "WATL 36". Not long after that, Fox subsequently sold the station to Qwest Broadcasting, a company partially owned by musician Quincy Jones and Tribune Broadcasting (Fox would not be without an owned-and-operated station in Atlanta for long, as it bought WAGA and the other New World stations in late 1996). Although it lost the Fox affiliation, WATL kept Fox Kids programming, which was not cleared by WAGA; outside of the loss of the prime time Fox shows and weekend sports, channel 36's programming was largely unchanged. WATL did affiliate with The WB in January 1995; since the sale to Qwest Broadcasting would not be finalized until December 14, 1995, the station ended up under the unusual distinction of being affiliated with one network while owned by another, as for nearly a year WATL operated as a WB affiliate (under the branding "WB 36") owned by Fox. In 1999, Tribune sold WGNX to the Meredith Corporation; the company then purchased WATL outright in February 2000. WATL continued to air Fox Kids programming until September of that year, when it moved to WHOT (channel 34, now Univision O&O WUVG). In 2004, the station rebranded from "WB 36" to "WATL, Atlanta's WB".

On January 24, 2006, CBS Corporation and Warner Bros. Entertainment (the Time Warner division that operated The WB) announced plans to dissolve The WB and UPN, combining them to launch The CW Television Network in September 2006. As part of this joint venture, it was announced that CBS-owned WUPA would become The CW's Atlanta affiliate. It would not have been an upset had WATL been chosen instead, however; CW representatives were on record as preferring to affiliate with The WB and UPN's "strongest" stations in terms of overall viewership, and Atlanta was one of the few markets where the WB and UPN stations were both relatively strong. On May 15, 2006, Tribune announced that the three WB affiliates it owned that would not become CW affiliates—WATL, WPHL-TV in Philadelphia and KTWB-TV in Seattle—would be joining MyNetworkTV, which was formed in February by Fox Television Stations and its syndication division, 20th Television. As a result, WATL is one of a handful of stations to have been affiliated with both Fox and MyNetworkTV.

=== Common ownership with WXIA-TV ===
On June 5, 2006, Tribune announced that it entered into an agreement to sell WATL to the Gannett Company, the owners of Atlanta's NBC affiliate WXIA-TV, for $180 million. The sale was completed on August 7, 2006, giving Gannett the first television duopoly in Atlanta. WATL aired Atlanta Falcons preseason games in August 2008 while its sister station was committed to the 2008 Summer Olympics.

WATL introduced its new on-air branding, MyATLTV, on August 20, 2006, ahead of the September 5 debut of MyNetworkTV (and about a month before The WB's final night of programming). Prior to the acquisition by Gannett, WATL's studios were located at One Monroe Place. When the station was acquired, WXIA management decided to move WXIA's operations to the Monroe Place studios (an atypical instance where the senior partner in a duopoly relocates to the studios of the junior partner). During construction, WATL's studios were located with WXIA at 1611 West Peachtree Street, behind competitor WSB. In the 2013–2014 television season, WATL changed its on-air name to The ATL.

On June 29, 2015, the Gannett Company split in two, with one side specializing in print media and the other side specializing in broadcast and digital media. At that time, both WATL and WXIA became part of the latter company named Tegna Inc.

Nexstar Media Group acquired Tegna in a deal announced in August 2025 and completed on March 19, 2026.

== Programming ==
The station airs Fox's Weekend Marketplace paid programming block on Saturdays from 7 to 9 a.m., in lieu of WAGA. WATL also broadcasts the Sony game shows Jeopardy! and Wheel of Fortune, a rarity for a MyNetworkTV affiliate, in the event that those programs are preempted on WXIA-TV.

In 2014, WATL reached a deal with Sinclair Broadcast Group to serve as the local outlet for its in-house syndicated programming, including Ring of Honor wrestling and the American Sports Network.

=== Newscasts ===
In September 2006, following its acquisition by Gannett, WXIA-TV began producing a prime time newscast at 10 p.m. for WATL, My 11 Alive News at 10 (now called 11 Alive News: Primetime at 10 on The ATL); it competes against the 10:00 p.m. newscast broadcast by WAGA. On December 2, 2019, WATL began airing WXIA-produced newscasts through all three hours of prime time weeknights, bumping MyNetworkTV programming to overnight hours.

In April 2017, WATL added a 7:00 p.m. newscast; it was meant as a temporary measure to allow the sale of additional ad inventory for the 2017 special election; however, it was continued after the election and remains on-air.

== Technical information ==
=== Subchannels ===
The station's signal is multiplexed:

Subchannels of WATL
Subchannel	Res.	Short name	Programming
36.1	1080i	WATL-DT	Main WATL programming
36.2	480i	NOSEY	Nosey
36.3	480i	Antenna	Antenna TV
36.4	480i	QVC	QVC
11.2	480i	Quest	Quest
11.11	1080i	WXIA-TV	NBC (WXIA-TV)

Simulcast of subchannels of another station

As with the same arrangement with sister stations KUSA and KTVD in Denver, WATL airs its main channel in upscaled 1080i rather than MyNetworkTV's default 720p format, allowing it to present syndicated programming and accommodate the broadcast of NBC programming preempted on WXIA without requiring downscaling.

From June 2006, WATL aired The Tube on digital channel 36.2, but following that network's shutdown in October 2007, the digital subchannel was deleted. In early December 2010, WXIA's 11Alive Weather Information Zone was moved from channel 11.2 to WATL's 36.2, before eventually returning it to WXIA. Atlanta-based Bounce TV aired on 36.2 from its launch on September 26, 2011, until September 25, 2017, when the network moved to WSB-TV's digital channel 2.2. At that point, 36.2 went dark, until a new network was announced, but returned to the air As of 17 January 2018, as an affiliate of This TV, which can be also seen on WANN-CD2.

In late October 2011, Universal Sports was added to digital channel 36.3, until the network ceased over the air broadcasting and moved to cable-only distribution at the end of 2011. On December 24, 2011, the channel was replaced by former owner Tribune's Antenna TV network.

In late summer 2019, the fourth subchannel of WATL was launched as a UHF simulcast of WXIA-TV, which allows homes with issues receiving WXIA's channel 10 VHF signal or only a UHF antenna to receive WXIA in some form. Instead of channel 36.4, WATL-DT4 maps to channel 11.11.

=== Analog-to-digital conversion ===
WATL shut down its analog signal, over UHF channel 36, on June 12, 2009, as part of the federally mandated transition from analog to digital television. The station's digital signal remained on its pre-transition UHF channel 25, using virtual channel 36.
