= Rate card =

Advertising document

A rate card, also known as a rate sheet, is a structured table or list that sets out the different list prices that apply to a range of services provided to enable the buyer to compare the options available. It is typically the standard published rates and therefore the maximum price a buyer will be expected to pay.

Rate cards are commonly used in the marketing and advertising industry, detailing the various advertisement placement options offered by a media outlet. They are also used for other industries such as property and vehicle repairs, hair and make up in the fashion industry or third party logistics companies, as well as professional services such as legal services.

The published prices on a rate card are typically the most someone can expect to spend, similar to the rack rate at a hotel. Some buyers will negotiate a reduced rate by leveraging their brand or scale or the seller may have targets to hit or reduce their rates to conclude a deal for a variety of reasons.

Rate cards may also provide additional details, such as any deadlines, demographics, policies, additional fees, or artwork requirements.

== See also ==
- Advertising management
- Yield management
- Price discrimination
- List price
