= 2012 Democratic National Convention =

U.S. political event held in Charlotte, North Carolina

- 2012 presidential election

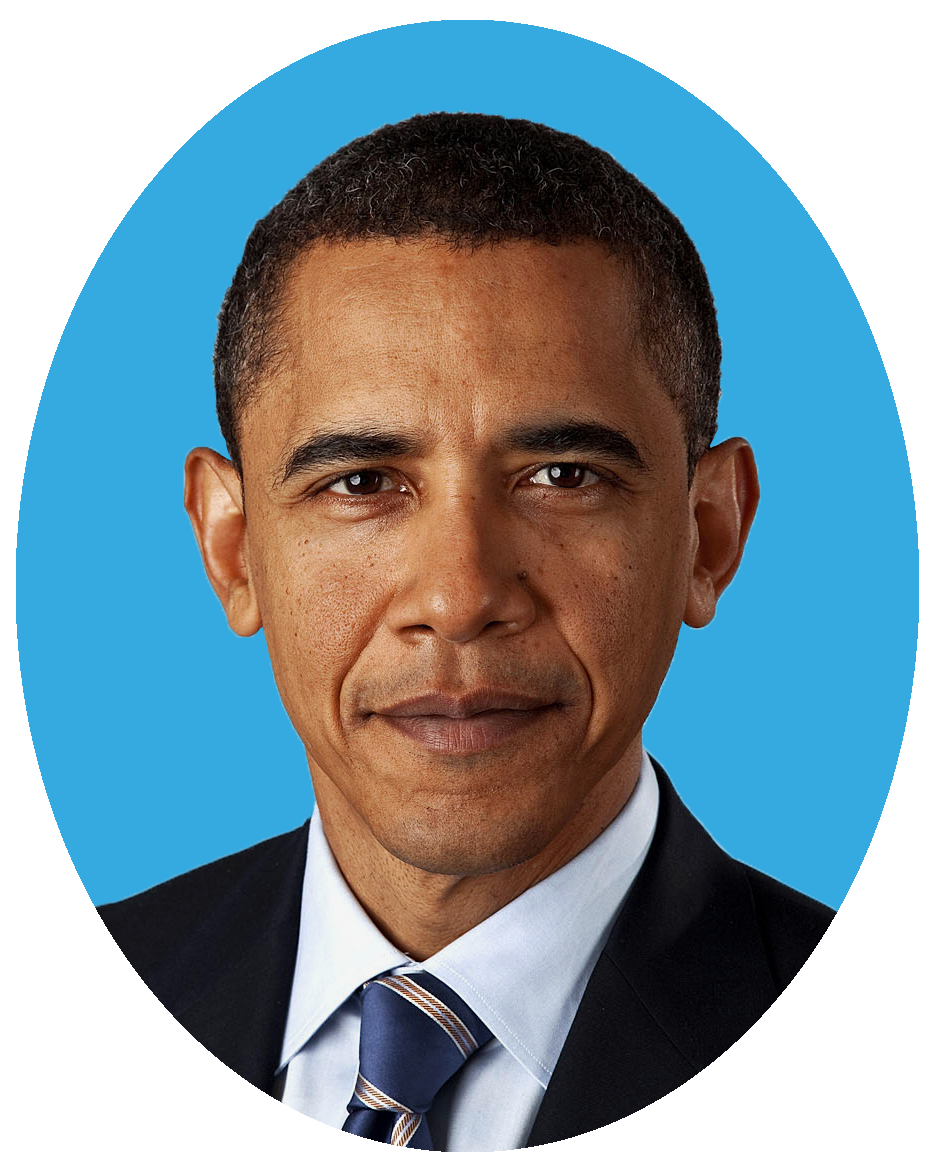
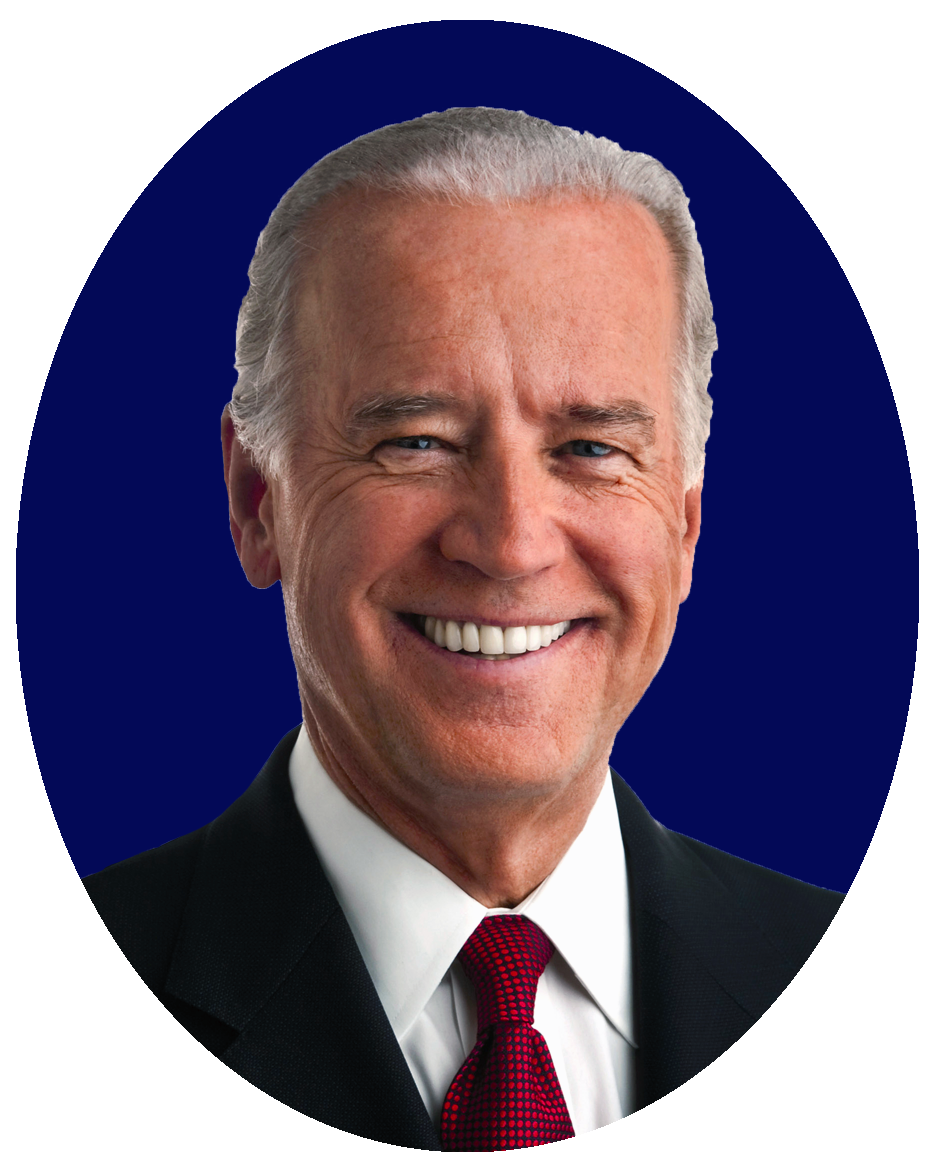
- Nominees; Obama and Biden

Convention
- Dates: September 4–6, 2012
- City: Charlotte, North Carolina
- Venue: Time Warner Cable Arena
- Chair: Antonio Villaraigosa
- Keynote speaker: Julian Castro of Texas
- Notable speakers: Jennifer Granholm; Cory Booker; Tim Kaine; Lincoln Chafee; Rahm Emanuel; Martin O'Malley; Michelle Obama; Sandra Fluke; Elizabeth Warren; Bill Clinton; Scarlett Johansson; Caroline Kennedy; Brian Schweitzer; Patty Murray; Barbara Mikulski; Charlie Crist

Candidates
- Presidential nominee: Barack Obama of Illinois
- Vice-presidential nominee: Joe Biden of Delaware
- Other candidates: Keith Russell Judd, Randall Terry and John Wolfe, Jr. (disqualified)

Voting
- Total delegates: 5,554
- Votes needed for nomination: 2,778 (Absolute Majority)
- Results (president): Obama (IL): 5,415 (100%)
- Results (vice president): Biden (DE): Acclamation
- Ballots: 1

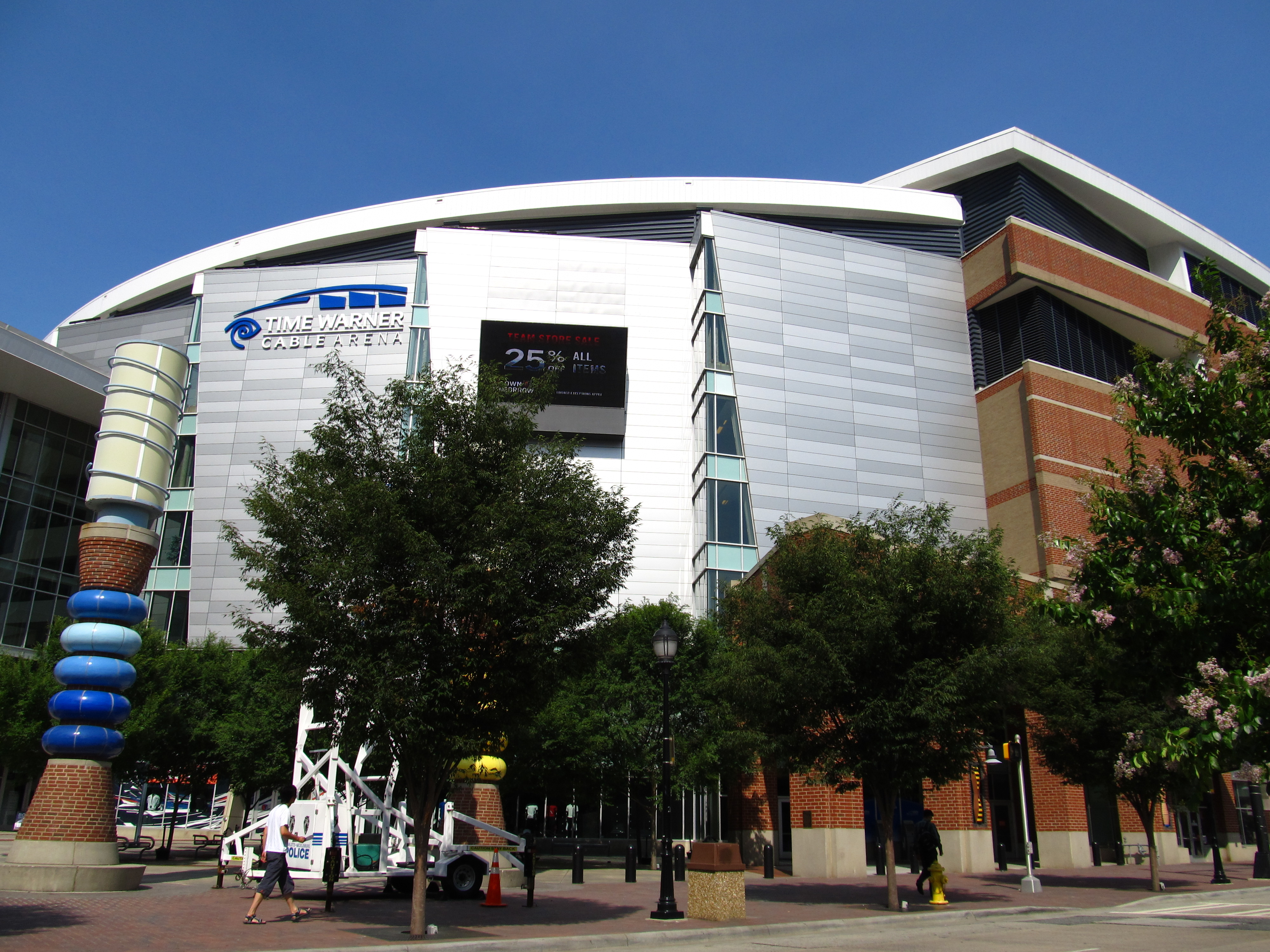
The Time Warner Cable Arena was the site of the 2012 Democratic National Convention.

Sites of the 2012 national party conventions

The 2012 Democratic National Convention was a gathering, held from September 4–6, 2012, at the Time Warner Cable Arena in Charlotte, North Carolina, in which delegates of the Democratic Party nominated President Barack Obama and Vice President Joe Biden for re-election, in the 2012 United States national election.

On April 3, 2012, President Barack Obama won the Maryland and District of Columbia primaries, giving him more than the required 2,778 delegates to secure the presidential nomination. He had previously announced that Vice President Joe Biden would remain as his vice presidential running mate in his re-election bid.

== Background ==
The convention was the 47th Democratic National Convention.

=== Site selection ===
Finalist bid cities
City	Venue	Previous major party conventions hosted by city
Charlotte, North Carolina (winner)	Time Warner Cable Arena	—N/a
Cleveland, Ohio	Quicken Loans Arena	Republican: 1924, 1936
Minneapolis, Minnesota	Hubert H. Humphrey Metrodome	Republican: 1892, 2008
St. Louis, Missouri	Scottrade Center	Democratic: 1876, 1888, 1904, 1916; Republican: 1896

First Lady Michelle Obama announced on February 1, 2011, in an email to supporters that Charlotte, North Carolina, had been chosen as the site for the 2012 Convention. The event was the first nominating convention of a major party ever held in North Carolina. Charlotte had beaten three other finalists, Cleveland, Minneapolis and St. Louis. It was expected that Charlotte's hosting of this event would generate more than $150 million for Charlotte and surrounding metropolitan areas and bring over 35,000 delegates and visitors. North Carolina was a closely contested state in the 2008 presidential election, with Barack Obama winning the state's 15 electoral votes by just 13,692 votes (out of more than 4.2 million votes cast) and Democrats Kay Hagan and Bev Perdue winning close elections for U.S. Senate and Governor, respectively.

On October 28, 2009, the Democratic National Committee (DNC) sent out letters to potential host cities seeking their interest in bidding for the convention. The deadline for cities to submit letters of interest was January 11, 2010. In March 2010, the DNC emailed interested cities request for proposals. The deadline for cities to respond was May 21, 2010.

On June 30, 2010, the DNC announced the four finalist cities.

== Convention activities ==
All three dates of the convention were held at the Time Warner Cable Arena. The last night, Thursday, September 6, was originally scheduled to be held at the 72,000-seat Bank of America Stadium, where presumptive presidential nominee Barack Obama was to deliver his acceptance speech. After Convention officials insisted that they would hold Thursday's activities at the stadium "rain or shine", the venue was moved to the 20,000 seat indoor arena "due to thunderstorm threat". Some in the media questioned the move, wondering whether it was motivated more by an inability to fill the 70,000-seat stadium and the possibility that empty seats would show a lack of enthusiasm. The risk of severe weather wasn't high; Charlotte NBC affiliate WCNC-TV chief meteorologist Brad Panovich tweeted that the "[s]evere threat is almost zero Thursday night & chance of rain is 20%", adding, "It's a simple question...if you had a Panthers game, concert or soccer match with a 20% chance of storms would you cancel 24 hrs prior?" The date of Obama's acceptance speech caused the National Football League to move the Kickoff game, normally on a Thursday, to Wednesday, September 5, to avoid a conflict. This in turn caused the DNC to move Joe Biden's vice presidential acceptance speech, normally held the day before the presidential acceptance speech, to Thursday, before Obama's speech, to avoid a conflict with the NFL game.

The convention was the first Democratic convention scheduled for only three days since 1948, joining only the 1972 Republican National Convention as the only conventions in modern convention history to be scheduled for three days. The start date of September 4 is also the latest a major convention has ever started.

=== Tuesday, September 4 – Julián Castro and Michelle Obama ===
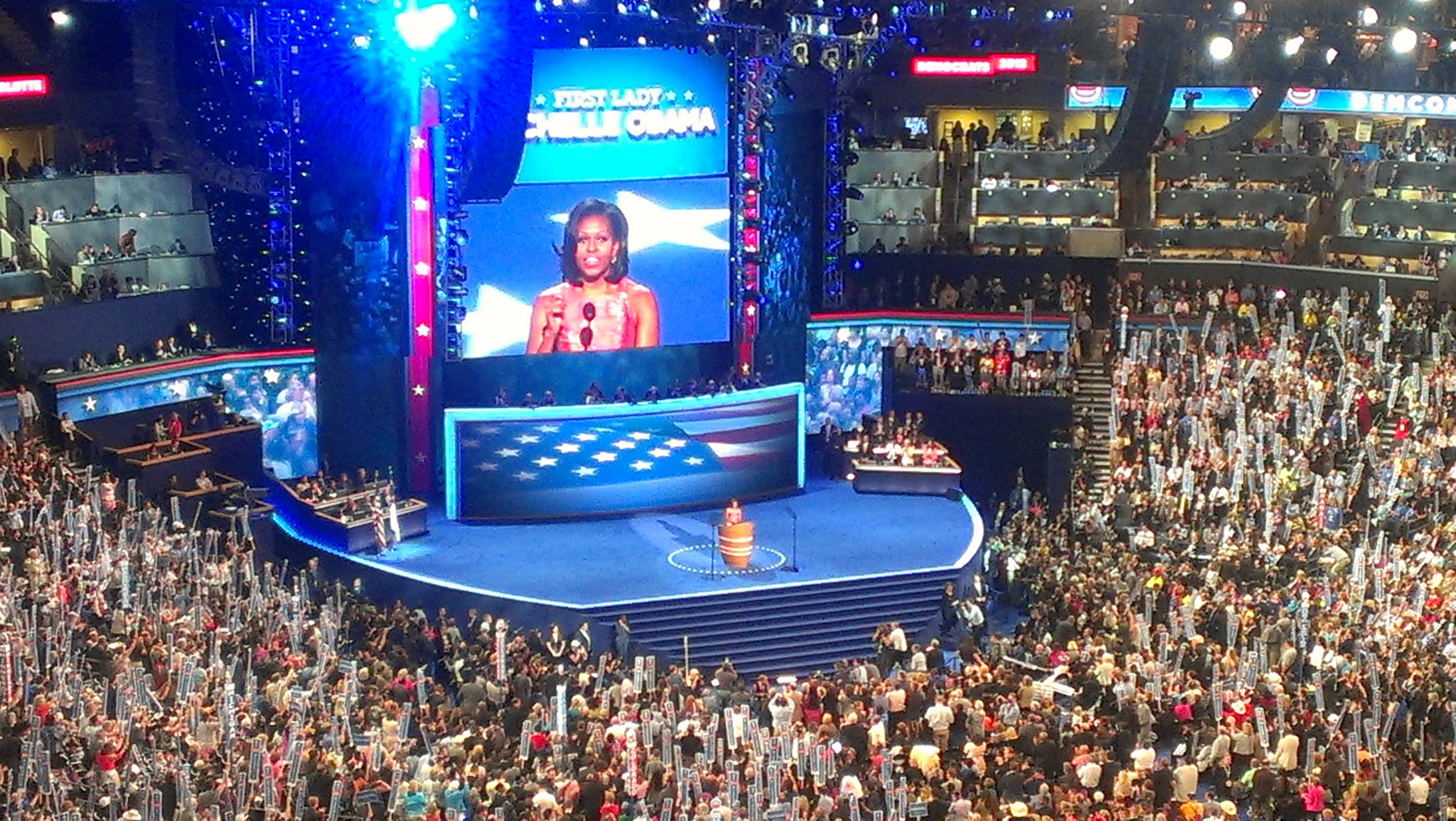
Michelle Obama speaks at the convention.

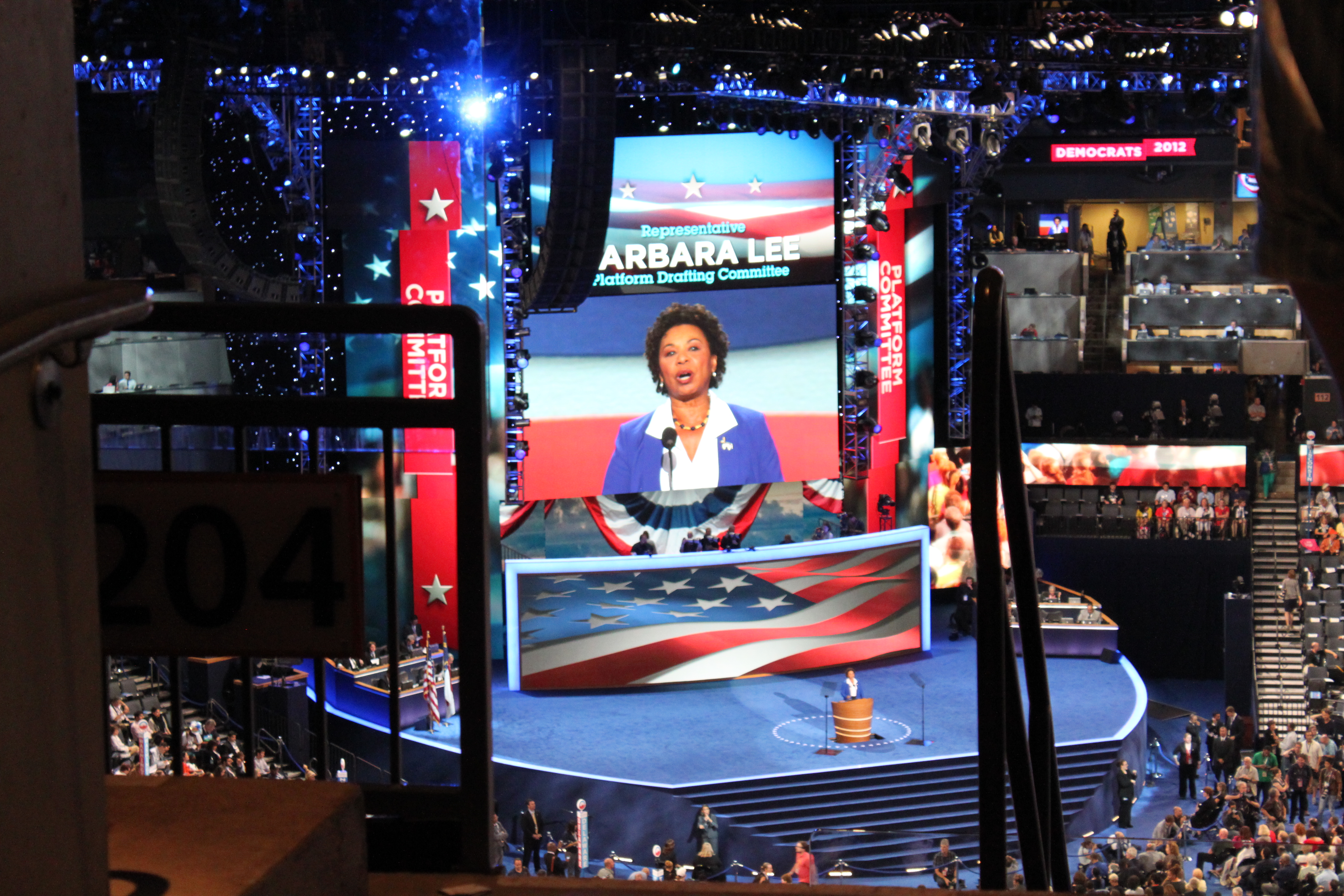
Barbara Lee speaks at the convention.

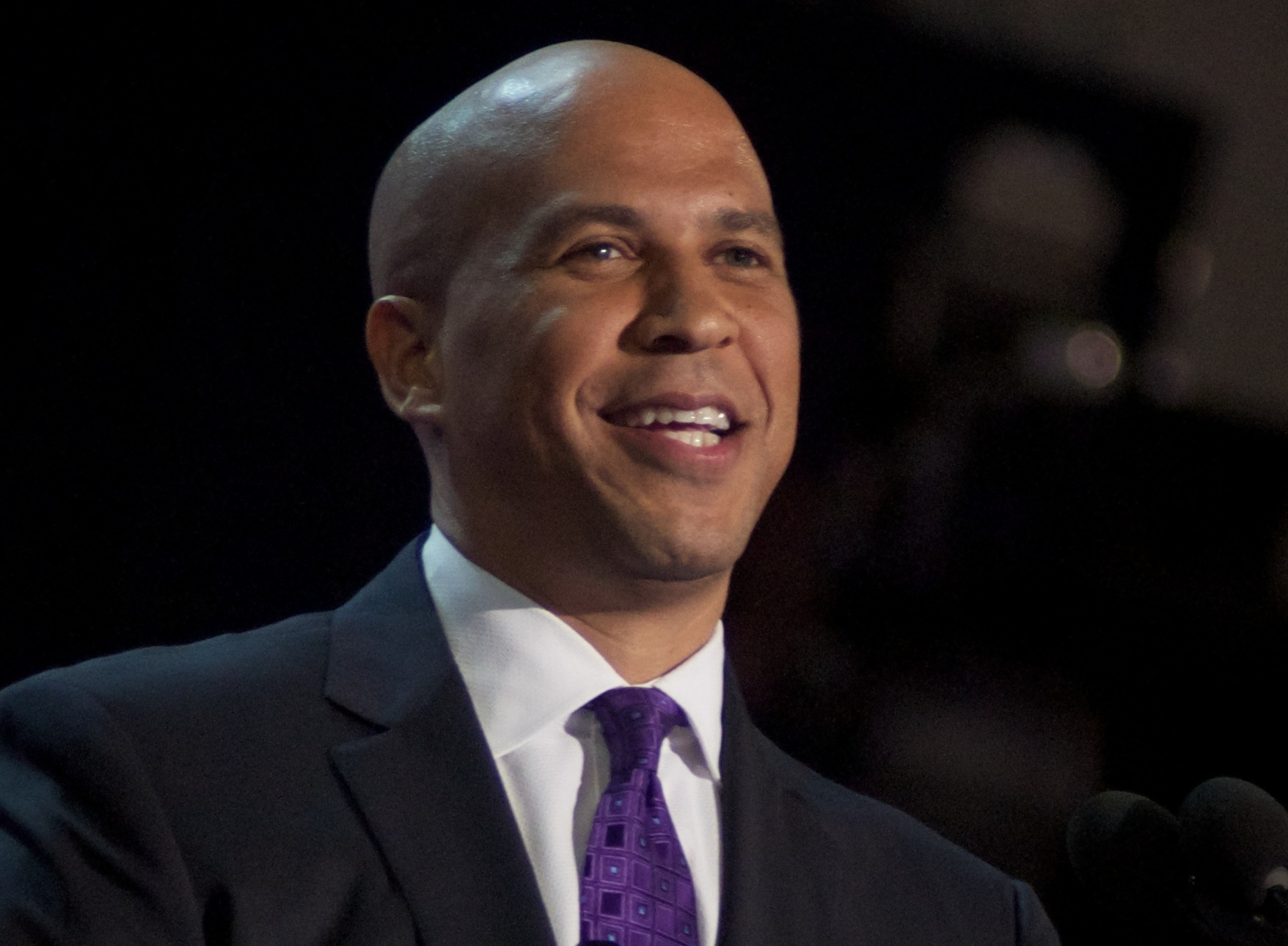
Cory Booker speaks at the convention.

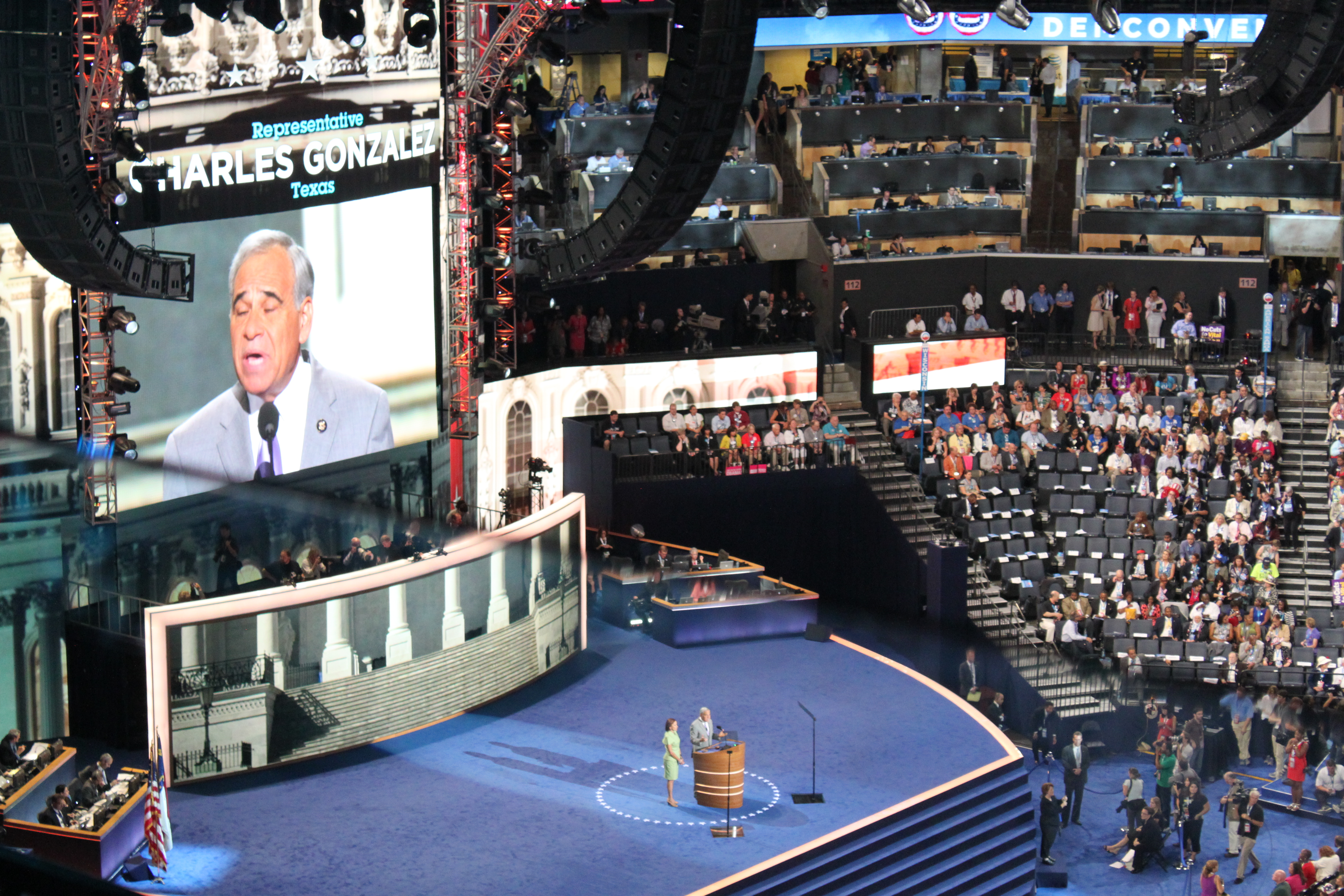
Charlie Gonzalez speaks at the convention.

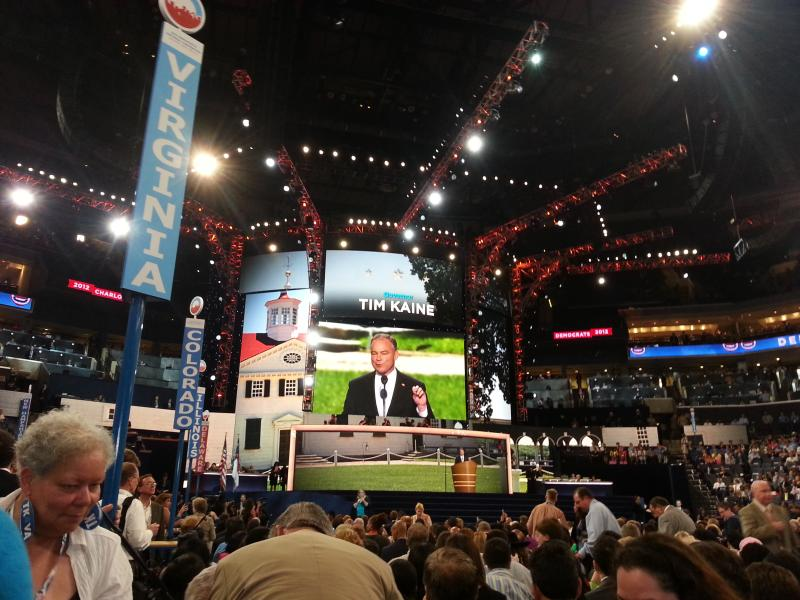
Tim Kaine speaks at the convention.

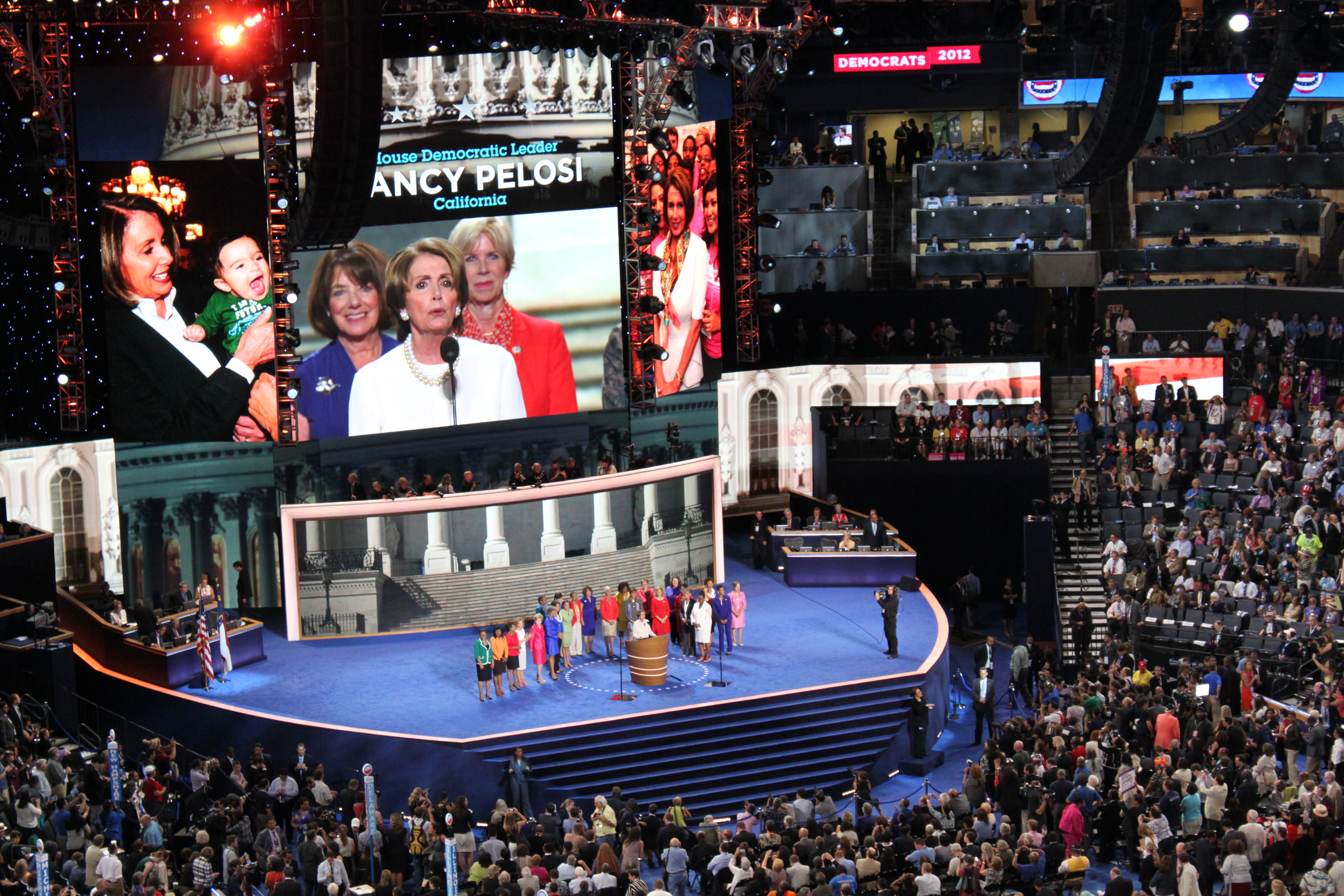
Nancy Pelosi speaks at the convention.

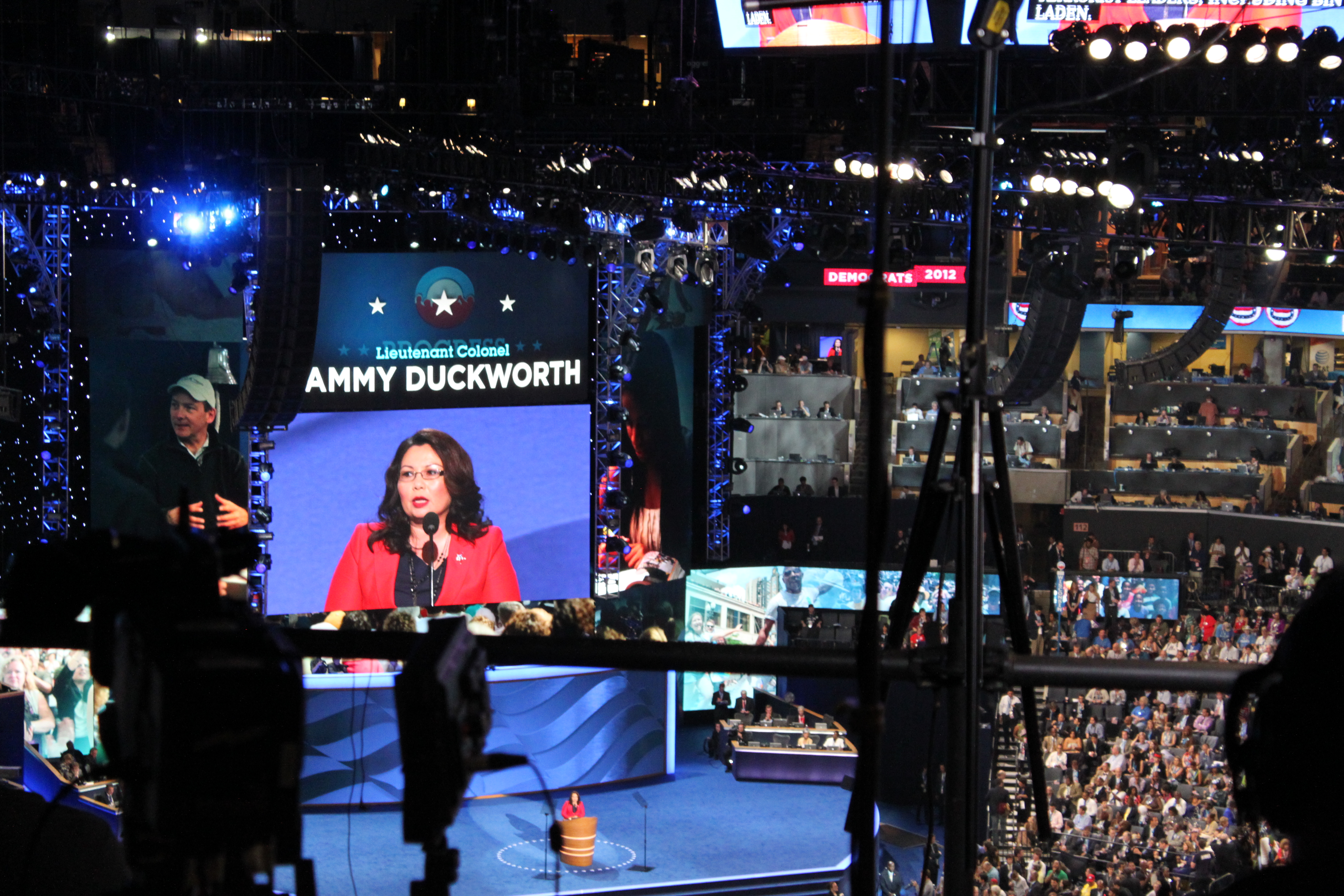
Tammy Duckworth speaks at the convention.

In the opening session on September 4, the keynote speech was delivered by then-37-year-old San Antonio Mayor Julian Castro. In his speech, Castro stated that "the Romney-Ryan budget ... doesn't just pummel the middle class, it dismantles it...it dismantles what generations before have built to ensure that everybody can enter and stay in the middle class" and that "Now we need to make a choice...a choice between a country where the middle class pays more so that millionaires can pay less, or a country where everybody pays their fair share, so we can reduce the deficit and create the jobs of the future. It's a choice between a nation that slashes funding for our schools and guts Pell Grants, or a nation that invests more in education. It's a choice between a politician who rewards companies that ship American jobs overseas, or a leader who brings jobs back home...this is the choice before us ... Our choice is a man who has always chosen us. A man who already is our president, Barack Obama", with the Global Post describing the audience as "adoring and appreciative" and the speech as "powerful words, and the audience responded with gratitude".

First Lady Michelle Obama gave the final speech of the evening, stating that "Barack knows what it means when a family struggles...he knows what it means to want something more for your kids and grandkids. Barack knows the American dream because he's lived it, and he wants everyone in this country to have that same opportunity, no matter who we are, or where we're from, or what we look like, or who we love." Her speech lasted 25 minutes and focused on the Barack Obama she fell in love with as well as the strength of the American Spirit and those in the military. "I've seen it in our men and women in uniform and our proud military families...in a young man blinded by a bomb in Afghanistan who said simply, 'I'd give my eyes 100 times again to have the chance to do what I have done, and what I can still do." Jim Rutenberg, of The New York Times, described the crowd as "electrified" by her remarks, "her impassioned delivery drawing the crowd to its feet".

The speakers for the day included:

- Barbara Lee, Representative for California's 9th congressional district
- Claudia J. Kennedy, Lieutenant General (ret.)
- Cory Booker, Mayor of Newark, New Jersey
- Bev Perdue, Governor of North Carolina
- Mary Kay Henry, President of the Service Employees International Union
- Charlie Gonzalez, Representative for Texas's 20th congressional district
- Nydia Velázquez, Representative for New York's 12th congressional district
- Pat Quinn, Governor of Illinois
- Doug Stern, firefighter from Cincinnati, Ohio
- Tim Kaine, former governor of Virginia and U.S. Senate candidate
- Anthony Foxx, Mayor of Charlotte, North Carolina
- Annise Parker, Mayor of Houston, Texas
- Harry Reid, Senior Senator from Nevada and Senate Majority Leader
- Nancy Pelosi, House Minority Leader and Representative for California's 8th congressional district with the Women of the House of Representatives including:
  - Rosa DeLauro, Representative for Connecticut's 3rd congressional district
  - Carolyn Maloney, Representative for New York's 14th congressional district
  - Allyson Schwartz, Representative for Pennsylvania's 13th congressional district
  - Gwen Moore, Representative for Wisconsin's 4th congressional district
  - Nydia Velázquez, Representative for New York's 12th congressional district
  - Tulsi Gabbard, former Honolulu, Hawaii, City Councillor and U.S. House Candidate for Hawaii's 2nd congressional district
  - Joyce Beatty, former Minority Leader of Ohio State House of Representatives and U.S. House Candidate for Ohio's 3rd congressional district
- Jimmy Carter, 39th President of the United States (via video)
- Ken Salazar, U.S. Secretary of the Interior.
- Joseph P. Kennedy III, U.S. House candidate for Massachusetts's 4th congressional district
- Robert Wexler, president of the S. Daniel Abraham Center for Middle East Peace and former representative for Florida's 19th congressional district
- R. T. Rybak, Mayor of Minneapolis, Minnesota
- Ryan Case, student, University of Colorado at Boulder
- Jared Polis, Representative for Colorado's 2nd congressional district
- Maria Ciano, stay-at-home mother and former Republican voter
- Nancy Keenan, President of NARAL Pro-Choice America
- Nate Davis, Xavier University - Director of Veteran's Affairs
- Tammy Duckworth, former Assistant Secretary, U.S. Department of Veterans Affairs and U.S. House Candidate for Illinois's 8th congressional district
- Lincoln Chafee, Independent Governor of Rhode Island
- Stacey Lihn, mother
- Ted Strickland, former governor of Ohio
- Kathleen Sebelius, U.S. Secretary of Health and Human Services and former governor of Kansas
- Rahm Emanuel, Mayor of Chicago, Illinois, and former White House Chief of Staff
- Kal Penn, actor and associate director, White House Office of Public Engagement
- Craig Robinson, brother of Michelle Obama and basketball coach for Oregon State University
- Maya Soetoro-Ng, half-sister of Barack Obama
- Lilly Ledbetter, women's rights activist
- Deval Patrick, Governor of Massachusetts
- Martin O'Malley, Governor of Maryland
- Joaquín Castro, Texas State Representative and U.S. House Candidate for Texas's 20th congressional district
- Julian Castro, Mayor of San Antonio, Texas
- Elaine Brye, teacher from Winona, Ohio
- Michelle Obama, First Lady of the United States –speech by spouse of the presidential nominee

=== Wednesday, September 5 – Elizabeth Warren and Bill Clinton ===
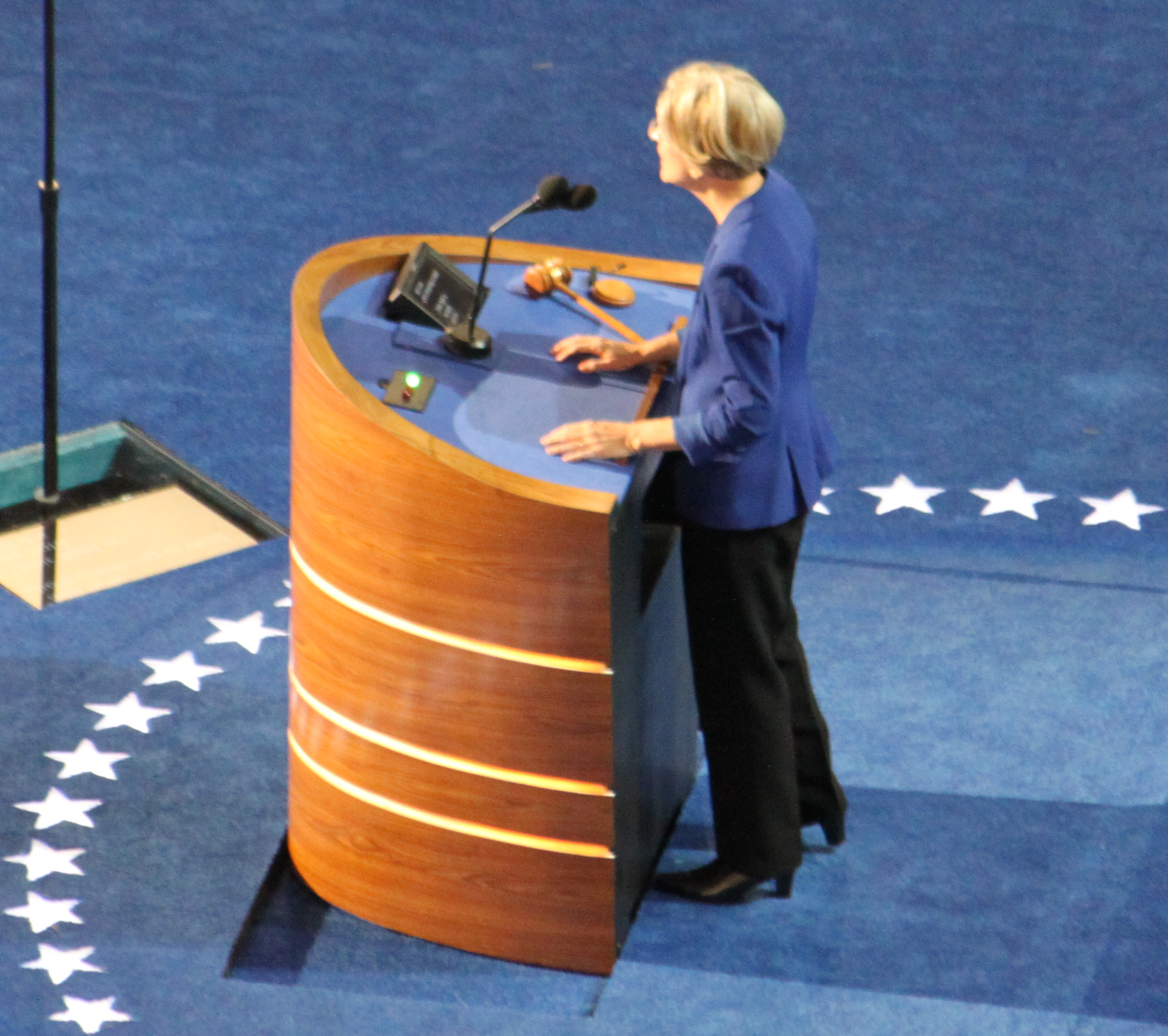
Elizabeth Warren speaks at the convention.

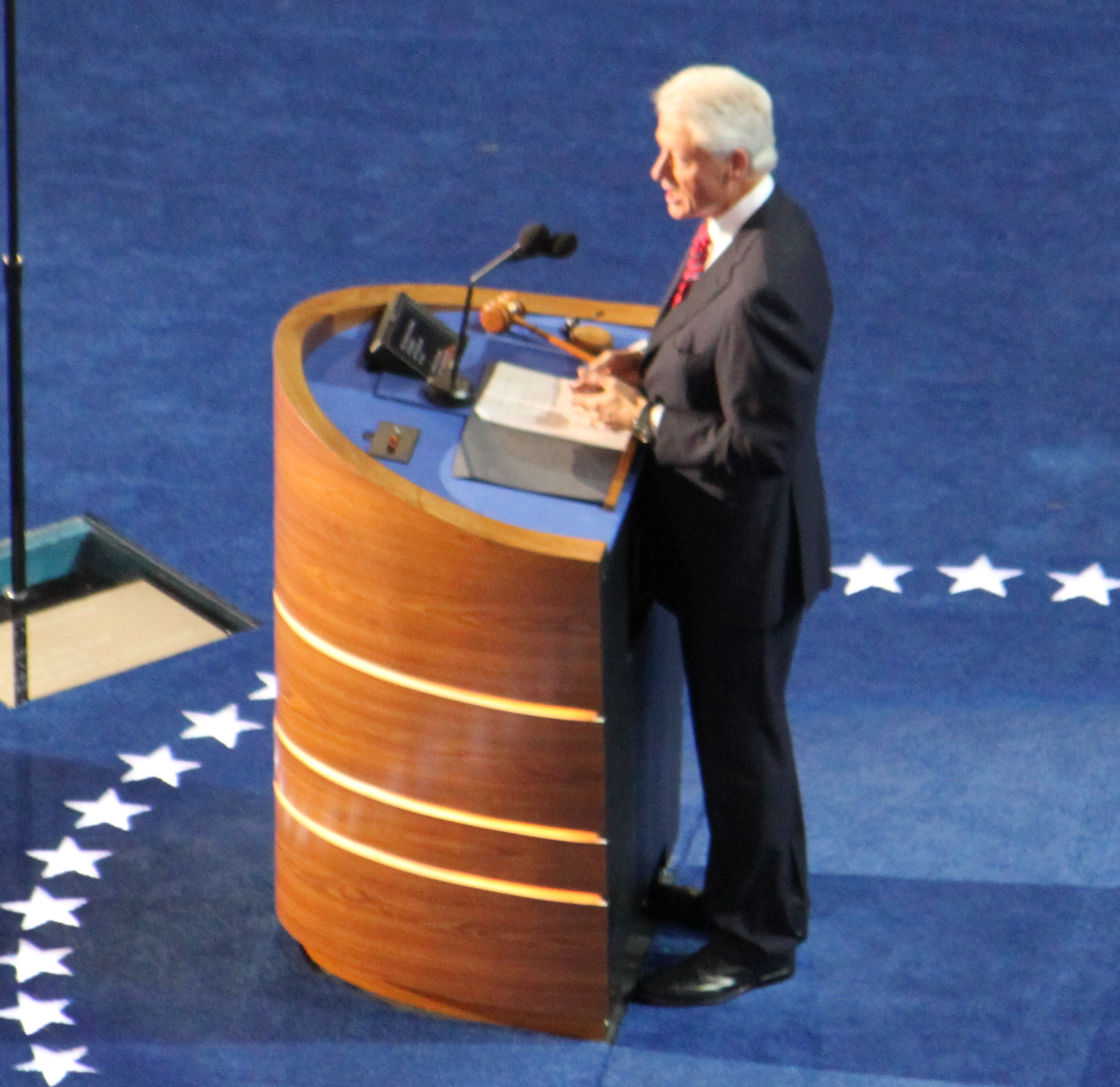
Former President Bill Clinton delivers his speech nominating Barack Obama for the Democratic nomination.

The speakers for the day included:

- Luis Gutiérrez, Representative for Illinois's 4th congressional district
- Diana DeGette, Representative for Colorado's 1st congressional district
- John Pérez, Speaker of the California State Assembly
- Thomas Menino, Mayor of Boston, Massachusetts
- Judy Chu, Representative for California's 32nd congressional district
- Steve Westly, former State Controller and Chief Financial Officer of California
- John Larson, Representative for Connecticut's 1st congressional district
- Ken Myers, Deputy Sheriff for Carroll County, Iowa
- Richard Trumka, President of the American Federation of Labor and Congress of Industrial Organizations
- Steve Israel, Democratic Congressional Campaign Committee Chairman and Representative for New York's 2nd congressional district
- Patty Murray, U.S. Senator (Senior) from Washington
- Pedro Pierluisi, Resident Commissioner of Puerto Rico
- Tom Steyer, founder and co-Senior Managing Partner of Farallon Capital Management, LLC
- Chuck Schumer, U.S. Senator (Senior) from New York
- Karen Bass, Representative for California's 33rd congressional district
- Al Green, Representative for Texas's 9th congressional district
- Emanuel Cleaver, Representative for Missouri's 5th congressional district
- Dannel Malloy, Governor of Connecticut
- Denise Juneau, Montana State Superintendent of Public Instruction
- Nancy Pelosi, House Minority Leader and Representative for California's 8th congressional district
- Tom Vilsack, U.S. Secretary of Agriculture
- Barbara Mikulski, Senior Senator from Maryland
- Arne Duncan, U.S. Secretary of Education
- Johanny Adames, student
- Jim Hunt, former governor of North Carolina
- Elizabeth Bruce, mother with endometriosis
- Cecile Richards, President of Planned Parenthood Federation of America
- Steny Hoyer, House Minority Whip and Representative for Maryland's 5th congressional district
- Ed Meagher, Vietnam War veteran
- Eric Shinseki, U.S. Secretary of Veteran's Affairs and former Chief of Staff of the United States Army
- John Hickenlooper, Governor of Colorado
- Simone Campbell, executive director of NETWORK
- Jack Markell, Governor of Delaware
- Karen Mills, Administrator of the Small Business Administration
- Bill Butcher, craftbrewer
- Kamala Harris, Attorney General of California
- Benita Veliz, the first person to address a United States national political convention while knowingly and unlawfully residing in the country
- Cristina Saralegui, journalist, actress and talk-show host
- Austin Ligon, co-founder and former CEO of CarMax Inc.
- Karen Eusanio, General Motors worker
- Bob King, President of the United Auto Workers
- Randy Johnson, Cindy Hewitt and David Foster, portrayed as former Employees of Bain Capital.
- Chris Van Hollen, Representative for Maryland's 8th congressional district
- Sandra Fluke, the Georgetown law student and reproductive-health advocate at the center of the Rush Limbaugh–Sandra Fluke controversy
- Jim Sinegal, co-founder and former CEO of Costco
- Elizabeth Warren, U.S. Senate candidate for Massachusetts
- Antonio Villaraigosa, Mayor of Los Angeles, California and Chairman of the 2012 Democratic National Convention
- Bill Clinton, 42nd President of the United States

David Foster was identified as a former employee of Bain Capital, advertised as an employee of GST Steel during Bain's acquisition of the then-bankrupt company in 2001, after Romney had taken a leave of absence for the company. Foster, however, was never a GST Steel employee; instead, he was an employee of the United Steelworkers of America assigned to organize the local chapter of the union.

==== Platform vote and controversy ====
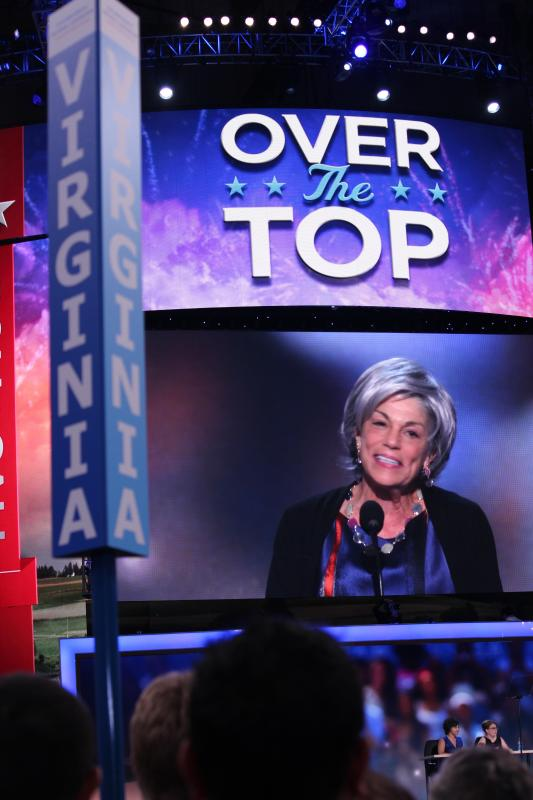
The Ohio delegation brought Obama's vote tally over the top.

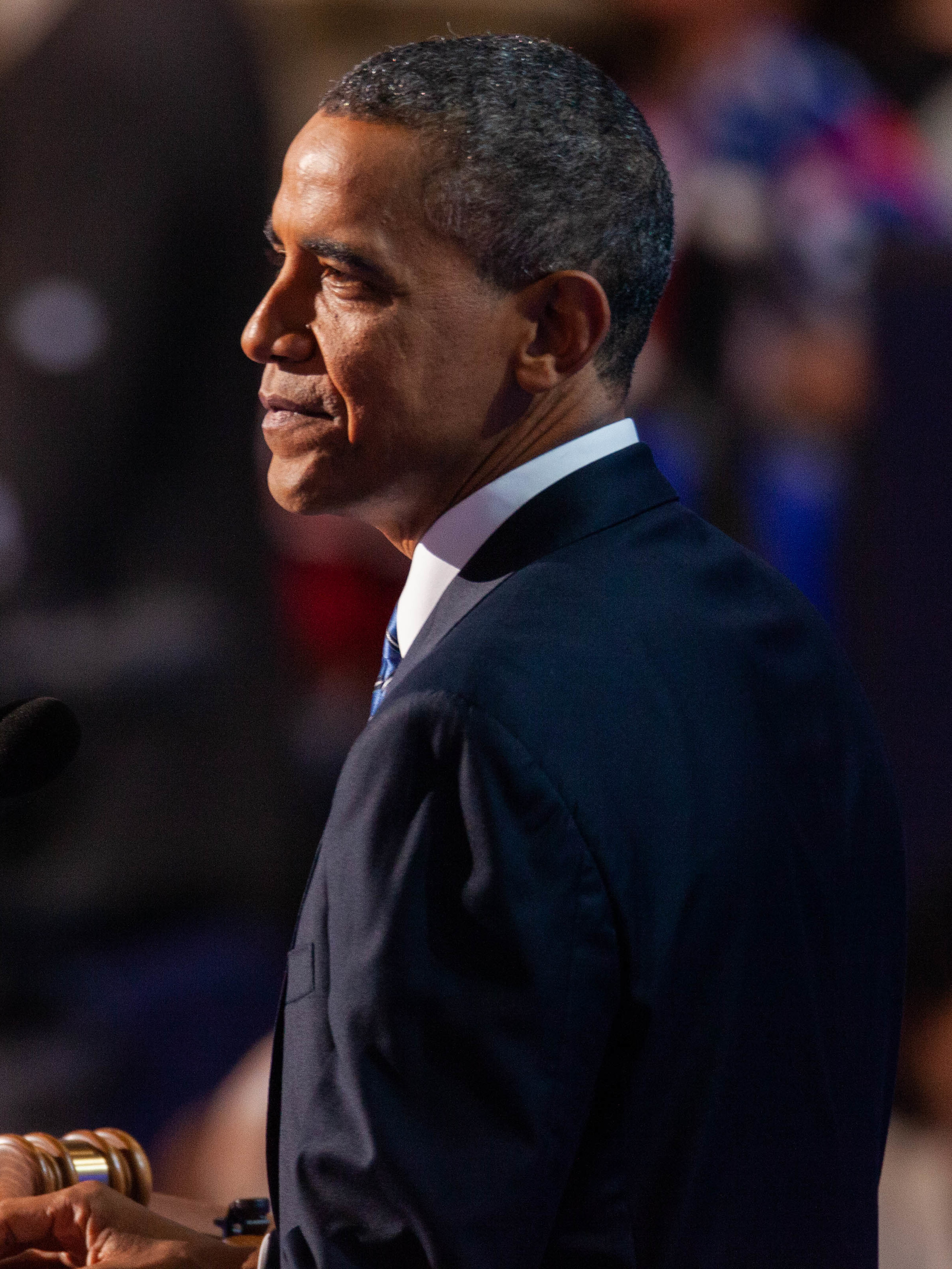
President Barack Obama subsequently accepting his re-nomination on the closing night of the convention

The original 2012 party platform caused controversy after it was written, because the typical invocations and references to God and God-given rights were omitted, and language affirming the role of Jerusalem as the capital of Israel was removed. On Wednesday, September 5, former Ohio Governor Ted Strickland introduced an amendment on the floor of the convention to reinsert language invoking God and recognizing Jerusalem as Israel's capital. Convention chairman Antonio Villaraigosa put the amendment to a voice vote requiring a two-thirds majority for passage. After the first vote was indecisive, Villaraigosa called for a second vote, which was again met with an equal volume of "ayes" and "nos". A woman standing to his left said, "You've got to rule, and then you've got to let them do what they're gonna do." Villaraigosa called a third vote with the same result. Villaraigosa then declared the amendment passed, causing an eruption of boos on the floor.

==== Nomination of Obama ====
Bill Clinton officially nominated Obama for re-election and Obama was nominated unanimously by the 5,556 delegates of the convention. During the roll call, Mississippi delayed its vote so Ohio could give Obama the nomination, putting the tally over the top of 2,778 votes. The roll call continued while delegates started to leave and ended with Wyoming casting its votes in an almost empty hall.

The Balloting:

Candidates	
Name	Barack H. Obama
Certified Votes	5,556 (100.00%)
Abstentions	0 (0.00%)
total:	5,556 (100.00%)

=== Thursday, September 6 – Joe Biden and Barack Obama ===
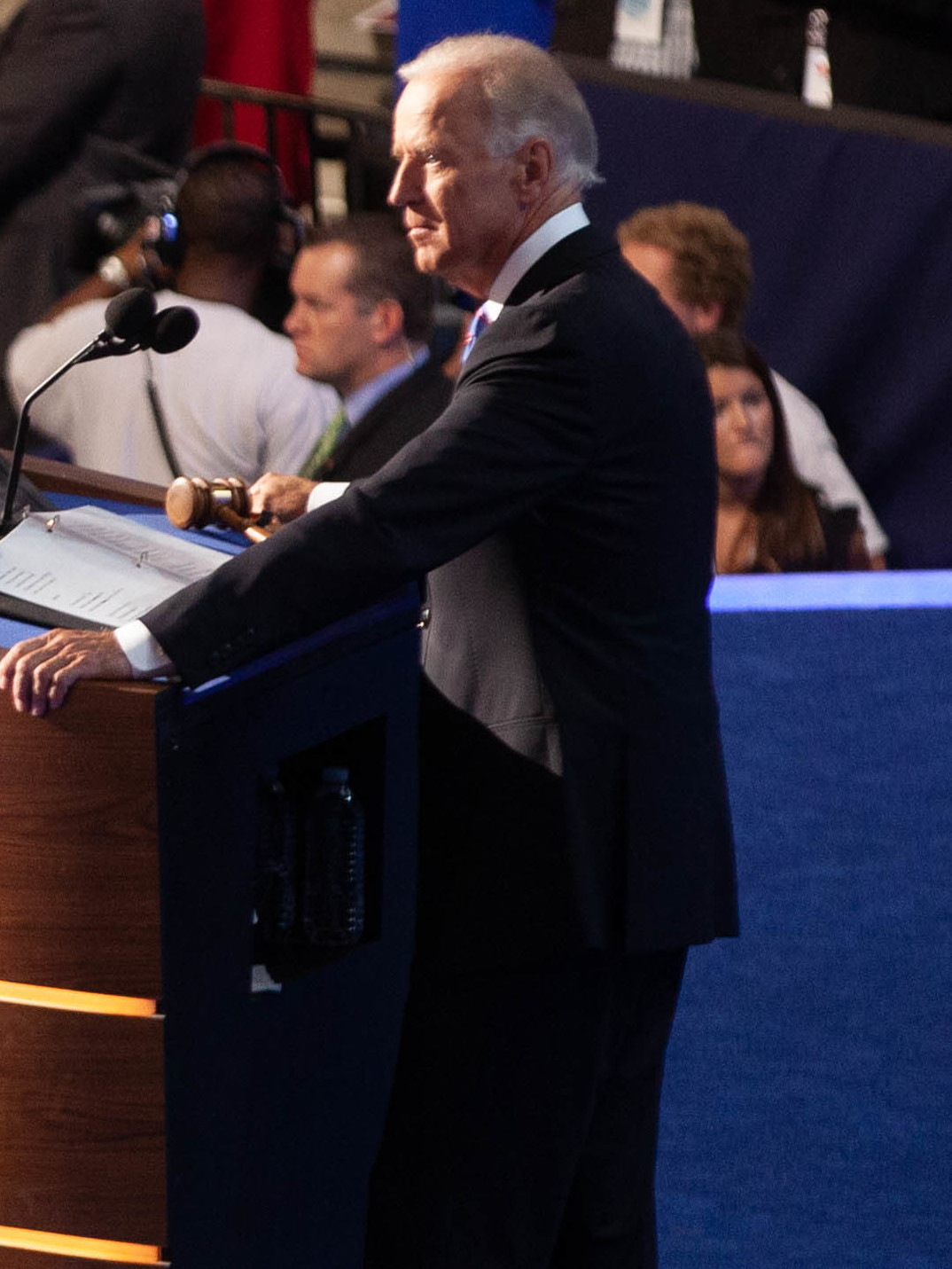
Vice President Joe Biden accepting his re-nomination

==== Nomination of Biden ====
Vice President Biden was nominated by voice vote.

==== Speakers ====
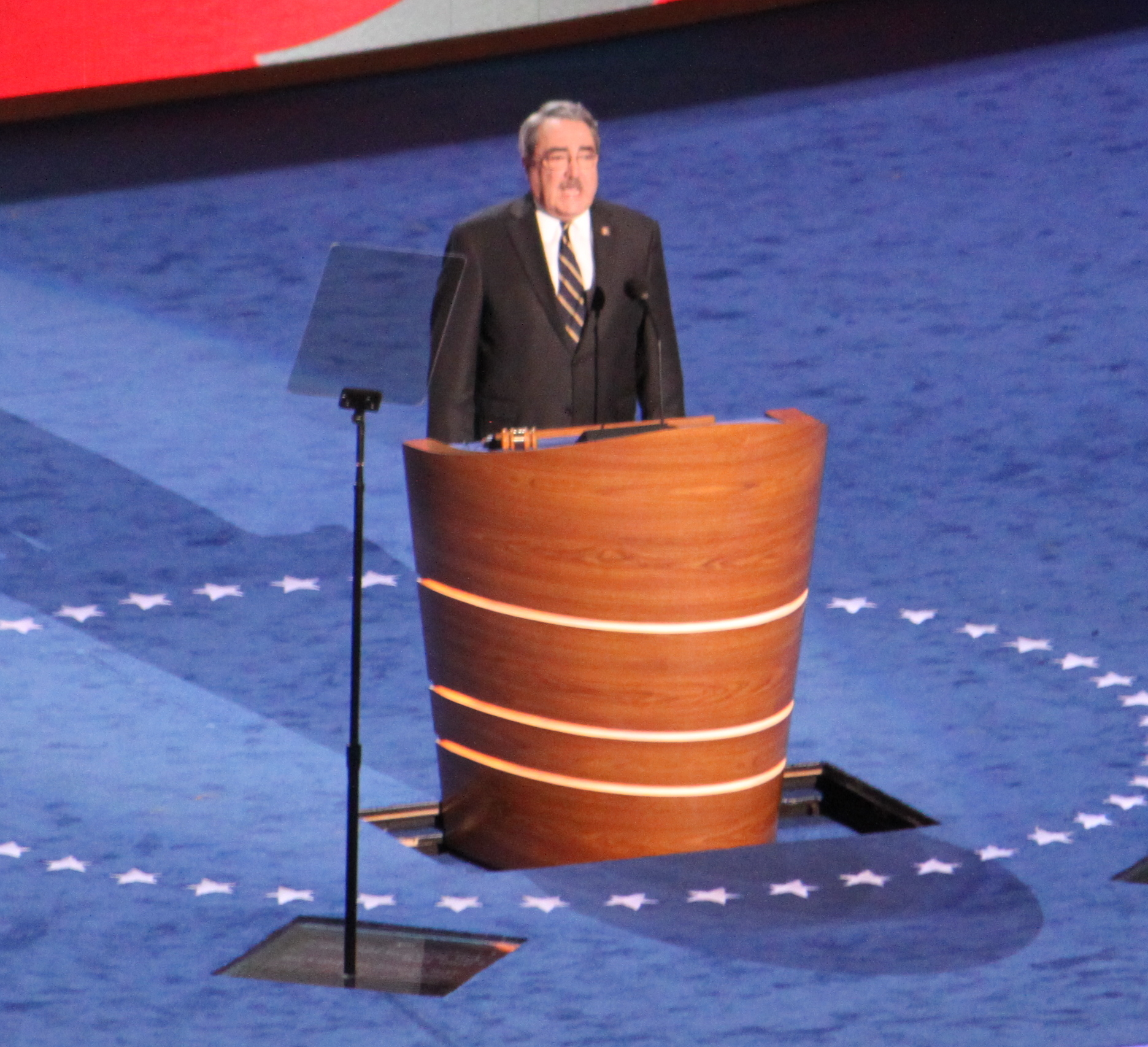
G. K. Butterfield speaking at the convention

The speakers for the day included:

- Kay Hagan, Junior Senator for North Carolina
- Walter Dalton, Lieutenant Governor of North Carolina
- G. K. Butterfield, Representative for North Carolina's 1st congressional district
- David Price, Representative for North Carolina's 4th congressional district
- Mel Watt, Representative for North Carolina's 12th congressional district
- James Rogers, CEO of Duke Energy
- Carol Berman, grandmother
- Donna Edwards, Representative for Maryland's 4th congressional district
- Barney Frank, Representative for Massachusetts's 4th congressional district
- Harvey Gantt, former mayor of Charlotte, North Carolina
- John Lewis, Representative for Georgia's 5th congressional district
- Alejandra Salinas, President of the College Democrats of America
- Jason Crow, Iraq War veteran
- Debbie Wasserman Schultz, Chair of the Democratic National Committee and Representative for Florida's 20th congressional district
- Tammy Baldwin, Representative for Wisconsin's 2nd congressional district and U.S. Senate Candidate.
- Michael Nutter, Mayor of Philadelphia, Pennsylvania
- Zach Wahls, LGBT rights activist
- Jim Messina, Campaign Manager, Obama for America
- Beau Biden, Attorney General of Delaware and Son of Vice President Joe Biden
- James Clyburn, Representative for South Carolina's 6th congressional district
- Scarlett Johansson and Kerry Washington, actors
- Caroline Kennedy, author and daughter of former president John F. Kennedy
- Xavier Becerra, Representative for California's 31st congressional district
- Jennifer Granholm, former governor of Michigan
- Eva Longoria, actress and Obama Campaign co-chair
- Brian Schweitzer, Governor of Montana
- Charlie Crist former Republican governor of Florida
- John Kerry, Senior Senator for Massachusetts
- John Nathman, Admiral (ret.) and Obama Campaign co-chair
- Angie Flores, student
- Jill Biden, Second Lady of the United States ––speech by spouse of the vice presidential nominee
- Joe Biden, Vice President of the United States ––acceptance speech by vice presidential nominee
- Michelle Obama, First Lady of the United States ––speech by spouse of the presidential nominee
- Barack Obama, President of the United States ––acceptance speech by presidential nominee

Pledge of Allegiance:

- Gabby Giffords, former representative of Arizona's 8th congressional district

Live Music Performances:

- James Taylor
- Mary J. Blige
- Foo Fighters
- Jessica Sanchez

==== Military montage ====
During the last night, as Senator Kerry and retired Admiral Nathman spoke, there was a montage of military ships and aircraft, as a tribute to veterans; the ships were Russian warships, and the aircraft were Turkish F-5s. The Democratic National Convention Committee later apologized for the featuring of Russian warships.

== Protest activity and policing ==
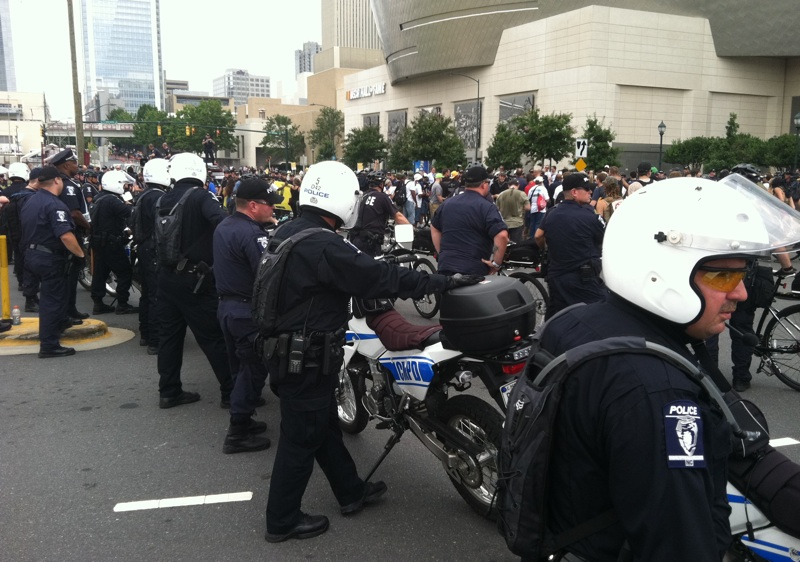
Police working crowd control near the NASCAR Hall of Fame during Manning-related protests

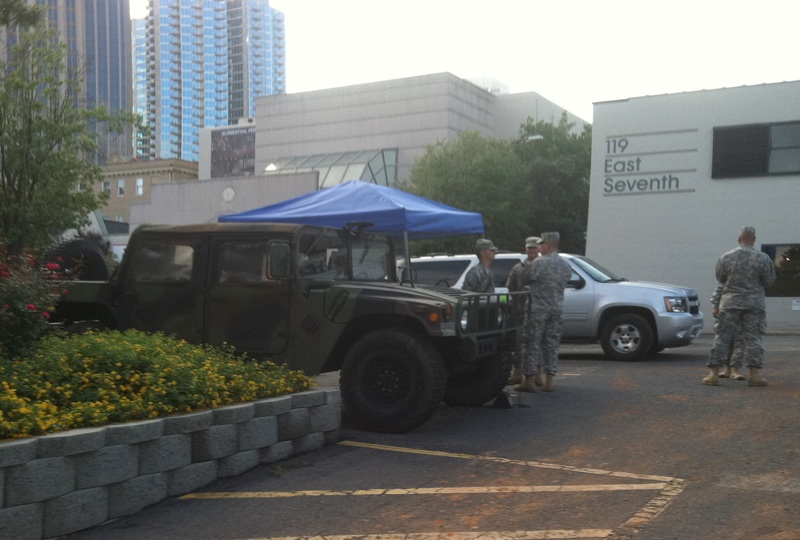
Military patrol providing security to the convention

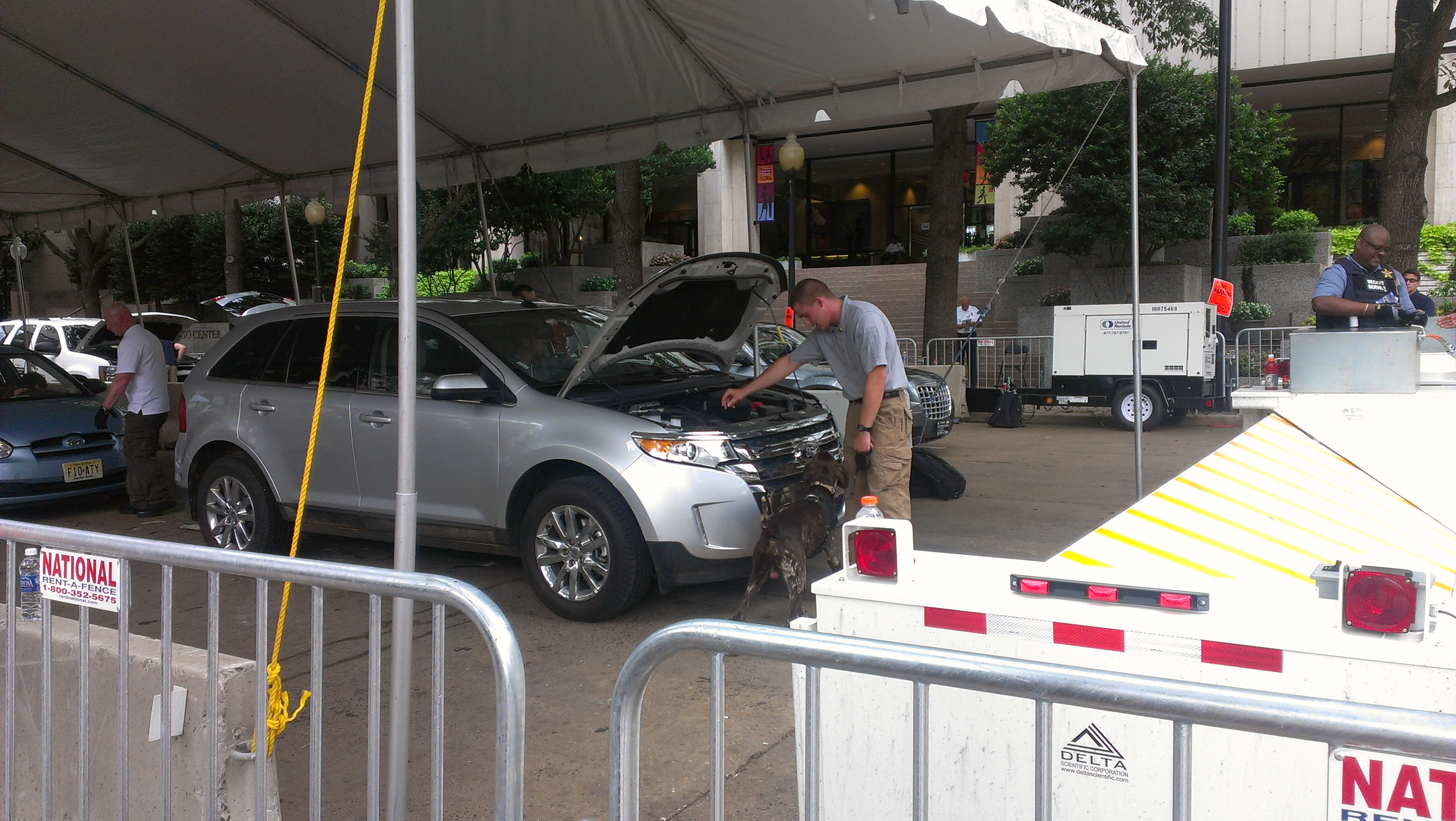
Vehicles are inspected at a security checkpoint near the convention hall.

Protest activity and demonstrations was anticipated at the convention. Over ninety organizations gathered into a group known as the Coalition to March on Wall St. South, and declared their intention to protest at the convention. The left-leaning coalition reflected the rhetoric and ideology of the Occupy Wall Street Movement, and several Occupations from North Carolina endorsed of the coalition. Demonstrators said they want to call attention to the influence of corporations on politics as well as the role of the military-industrial complex in US politics; they scheduled a dance party to honor then-imprisoned soldier Chelsea Manning. One group of undocumented immigrant workers travelled to the convention via bus, "The Undocubus." They risked deportation if arrested.

Charlotte received a $50 million grant from the federal government for convention security. The city spent roughly $25 million on its police force. Some of the money has been allocated to police bicycles ($303,596), software ($61,000), and a 'command center upgrade' ($704,795). The city also spent $937,852 on officers from neighboring forces.

In anticipation of protest activity, the city of Charlotte passed a variety of new ordinances. These include:

- Rules prohibiting camping on public property.
- Restricting the possession and use of a list of different items during and within the boundaries of a declared "extraordinary event": permanent markers; backpacks carried with the intent to conceal weapons; cables; bars; projectiles; spray guns; breakable containers capable of being filled with a flammable substance carried with the intent to inflict serious injury; aerosol containers; fireworks; smoke bombs; pepper spray or mace carried with the intent to delay, obstruct or resist the lawful orders of a law enforcement officer; masks or scarves worn with the intent to hide one's identity while committing a crime; body-armor or helmets carried or worn with the intent to delay, obstruct or resist the lawful orders of a law enforcement officer; and police scanners.

These ordinances were permanent and remained effective after the end of the convention. The camping prohibition was used to evict Occupy Charlotte from its encampment in January 2012. . A request by Occupy Charlotte to enjoin enforcement of the camping prohibition was rejected by a State Court judge in March 2012.

The DNC was designated a National Special Security Event, and the Secret Service and Department of Homeland Security did some of the policing. The Charlotte-Mecklenburg Police Department was also responsible for the areas outside the convention venues. Police noted that it would be relatively easy to surround protestors in the city's downtown business district, which is enclosed by expressway.

By contract the DNC required Charlotte to create a demonstration area for people to exercise their First Amendment rights. Eventually the city of Charlotte became an open Free Speech Zone with peaceful protests, pickets, and pamphlets throughout the city.

== Controversies ==
=== Location ===
After North Carolina voters passed Amendment 1, on May 8, 2012, banning same-sex marriage in the state, several groups called for the DNC to pull the convention out of Charlotte. Unions also complained about North Carolina's labor laws. However, the DNC said that they would still proceed with their plans to hold it in the state.

The leader of the Democratic National Committee Debbie Wasserman Schultz verified in an interview that North Carolina was chosen due to the controversy in the state and stated that it is "a critical battleground". When questioned about being able to raise the funds for the convention Schultz stated "We're not having a hard time raising the funds", contrary to reports.

=== Disqualified delegates ===
Randall Terry, a vocal pro-life advocate and former Republican congressional and state senate candidate, received a large enough percentage of votes in the Oklahoma Primary to receive as many as seven delegates. However, the DNC has declared him as "illegitimate" because he failed to inform the Oklahoma Democratic Party of the names of his delegates. As such, no Terry delegates were in attendance. Keith Russell Judd and John Wolfe, Jr., who have also both qualified for delegates to the convention by virtue of their performances in West Virginia (in Judd's case), Arkansas and Louisiana (in Wolfe's), faced similar obstacles to having their delegates seated. Wolfe commenced legal proceedings to have delegates in his name seated but lost his case one week prior to the start of the convention.

== Funding ==
The Democratic Party announced in February 2011 that it would not accept corporate donations to fund the convention. This decision was made to increase the party's populist appeal and create distance from Bank of America and the financial industry. In June 2012, the convention was $27 million short of its fundraising goals and consequently canceled some planned events. The previous DNC raised $33 million from corporate donors.

The Obama campaign also received less in union donations than it did in 2008.

Corporate sponsors were able to make in-kind donations such as transportation, as well as to host parties. They could also donate to a non-profit called "New American City, Inc.", which was run by the directors of the convention host committee. New American City, incorporated on April 4, 2011, existed to "defray administrative expenses incurred by the host committee organizations". (The host committee, in turn, provided "goods, facilities, equipment and services".)

Donors to this group included Bank of America, Wells Fargo and Duke Energy.

The Party's convention funds were stored in a Bank of America account. The convention also had a $10 million line of credit available from Duke Energy.

== See also ==
- Barack Obama 2012 presidential campaign
- Democratic National Convention
- Other parties' presidential nominating convention of 2012:
- Green
- Republican
- Libertarian
- 2012 United States presidential election
- History of the United States Democratic Party
- List of Democratic National Conventions
- U.S. presidential nomination convention
- 2012 Democratic Party presidential primaries

Preceded by 2008; Denver, Colorado	Democratic National Conventions	Succeeded by 2016; Philadelphia
