= Carol Iovanna =

Carol lovanna

- Born: March 2, 1952 (age 73)
- Occupations: Television journalist, news anchor, television producer
- Years active: 1982–2006 (broadcasting)
- Employer: Fox News
- Known for: Weekend late-night headlines on Fox News
- Notable work: Live with Regis and Kathie Lee

Carol Iovanna (born March 2, 1952) is a former newscaster on Fox News from 1996 to 2006. She often did the headlines in the late night hours during the weekends. Before Fox, she worked at WCBS-TV and WABC-TV. Iovanna also anchored the news on Live with Regis and Kathie Lee.

Iovanna was originally an anchor on the now-defunct Satellite News Channel (1982–83). After SNC folded, Iovanna, who began her broadcasting career in radio, joined WABC-TV in New York City. She lives in Stamford, Connecticut. She left Fox News in 2006 and started a television programming company, Illumination Productions, and serves as president and executive producer.
