= Amanda Davis (journalist) =

American journalist (1955–2017)

- Born: Amanda Marie Davis; October 17, 1955; San Antonio, Texas, U.S.
- Died: December 27, 2017 (aged 62); Atlanta, Georgia, U.S.
- Education: Clark College
- Years active: 1979–2017

Amanda Marie Davis (October 17, 1955 – December 27, 2017) was an American broadcast journalist and morning anchor of CBS 46 News in Atlanta, formerly working for Fox 5 News.

== Early life ==
Davis was born in San Antonio in 1955.

== Education ==
Davis graduated magna cum laude from Clark College in Atlanta, Georgia.

== Career ==
=== Early years (1979–1986) ===
Davis initially worked as a reporter for NBC affiliate WCNC-TV (then known as WRET-TV, before changing to WPCQ-TV in 1980) in Charlotte, North Carolina, for about four years. Afterwards, she worked at the short-lived Satellite News Channel. After SNC was bought out and shut down by Turner Broadcasting in 1983, Davis spent the next three years freelancing.

=== WAGA-TV Atlanta (1986–2013) ===
In 1986, Davis moved to Atlanta, Georgia, to work as a reporter for the CBS affiliate WAGA-TV (WAGA-TV would change their affiliation to FOX in December 1994). She was one of the original anchors of Good Day Atlanta when it debuted in 1992, before moving to the prime time newscast team in 1997.

During her tenure on the prime time news team, which saw her paired up with fellow reporter Russ Spencer, Davis was well known as the first journalist to host the "Wednesday's Child" segment since its launch by the Freddie Mac Foundation in 2000. She was also noted for covering activist Coretta Scott King's funeral and interviewing President-elect Barack Obama. Following a DUI arrest in November 2012, she retired from the network in 2013 after nearly 27 years. She was replaced by Cynnè Simpson as the host of the 5 p.m. and 10 p.m. broadcasts, while Lisa Rayam replaced Davis as the host of the 6 p.m. broadcast.

=== WGCL-TV Atlanta (2015–2017) ===
In 2015, after two years in retirement, Davis signed with Atlanta's CBS affiliate, WGCL-TV. Before she was scheduled to make a debut on its "Just a Minute" segment in June, she was arrested again for a DUI. Her debut was put on hold, as she received probation and entered rehab. After the stint in rehab, she was the subject of a three-part special about her alcoholism. On January 2, 2017, feeling she had beaten her addiction, she finally debuted with WGCL-TV on its morning and afternoon shows, following an arrest for driving under a suspended license in December.

== Personal life ==
=== Death ===
On December 26, 2017, Davis had a stroke at Hartsfield–Jackson Atlanta International Airport while waiting for a flight to San Antonio, Texas, to attend her stepfather's funeral the next day. She was taken to a local hospital, where she died the next night, at the age of 62.

=== Legacy ===
In honor of Davis, and to raise stroke awareness, several news anchors and reporters across the country wore red under the hashtag, #RedforAmanda. Davis made a posthumous cameo appearance in the debut episode of The CW series Black Lightning. The seventh episode "Equinox: The Book of Fate" is dedicated in her memory.

== Accolades ==
Davis won several awards, including ten Southeast Emmy Awards and an Edward R. Murrow Award.
