= WCNC-TV =

Television station in Charlotte, North Carolina

- Charlotte, North Carolina; United States
- Channels: Digital: 24 (UHF); Virtual: 36
- Branding: WCNC Charlotte

Programming
- Affiliations: 36.1: NBC; for others, see § Technical information and subchannels

Ownership
- Owner: Tegna Inc., a subsidiary of Nexstar Media Group; (WCNC-TV, Inc.)
- Sister stations: Nexstar: WJZY, WMYT-TV

History
- First air date: July 9, 1967
- Former call signs: WCTU-TV (1967–1970); WRET-TV (1970–1980); WPCQ-TV (1980–1989)
- Former channel numbers: Analog: 36 (UHF, 1967–2009); Digital: 22 (UHF, 1999–2019)
- Former affiliations: Independent (1967–1978)
- Call sign meaning: "Charlotte, North Carolina"

Technical information
- Licensing authority: FCC
- Facility ID: 32326
- ERP: 857 kW
- HAAT: 592.2 m (1,943 ft)
- Transmitter coordinates: 35°20′49.4″N 81°10′14.2″W
- Translator(s): see § Translators

Links
- Public license information: Public file; LMS
- Website: www.wcnc.com

WCNC-TV (channel 36, cable channel 6) is a television station in Charlotte, North Carolina, United States, affiliated with NBC. It is owned by the Tegna subsidiary of Nexstar Media Group; Nexstar also owns Fox affiliate WJZY (channel 46) and CW station WMYT-TV (channel 55). WCNC-TV's studios are located in the Wood Ridge Center office complex off Billy Graham Parkway (Route 4), just east of the Billy Graham Library in south Charlotte, and its transmitter is located in north-central Gaston County.

Channel 36 was established as WCTU-TV, an independent station, in 1967. After falling into receivership brought on by severe economic hardship, WCTU was purchased by Atlanta broadcast pioneer Ted Turner. Renamed WRET-TV, the station's fortunes turned around and thrived throughout the 1970s. WRET became Charlotte's NBC affiliate in 1978 following WSOC-TV's switch from NBC to ABC, launching local newscasts. Turner sold WRET to Westinghouse Broadcasting in 1979 to raise capital for his new venture CNN; as WPCQ-TV, the station struggled with limited resources, frequently preempting NBC fare—including the NBC Nightly News—and was used to develop talent for other stations in the Group W chain. Spun off to new ownership in 1984, WPCQ's status with NBC remained uncertain despite substantial technical upgrades and a reinvestment in local news. Purchased by The Providence Journal Company in 1988, the Belo Corporation in 1996, and Gannett in 2013, the station was renamed WCNC-TV in 1989 and has generally been Charlotte's third-rated television station since. Gannett's broadcast holdings were reorganized as Tegna in 2015, then purchased by Nexstar in 2026.

== History ==
=== Prior use of channel 36 in Charlotte ===
The first station to operate on ultra high frequency (UHF) channel 36 in Charlotte signed on the air January 5, 1954, as WAYS-TV; that station was sold and changed its call letters to WQMC on January 24, 1955. Charlotte's second television station, WAYS-TV/WQMC did not make any headway against WBTV (channel 3) because television set manufacturers were not required to include UHF tuning capability at the time; this would not change until Congress passed the All-Channel Receiver Act in 1961. It ceased operations in March 1955. A plan to return it to the air as WUTV under reconstituted ownership in 1957 was unsuccessful, but it aired educational programming from 1961 to 1963. Cy Bahakel bought the station in 1964 and returned it to the air as WCCB, which broadcast on channel 36 before moving to channel 18 in November 1966.

=== Charlotte Telecasters era ===
The current incarnation of channel 36 signed on the air on July 9, 1967, as WCTU-TV. Dr. Harold W. Twisdale, a dentist from Charlotte, and Washington, D.C.–based engineer David L. Steel were the leaders of the original ownership group, operating as Charlotte Telecasters Inc. The station had intended to take the call letters WCTI, but citing potential confusion, local educational station WTVI successfully objected; the U stood for UHF.

Twisdale and Steel were the lead investors in other planned UHF stations; though construction permits were never built for stations in Memphis and Richmond and the group lost out on channel 28 in Durham, WCTU-TV and WATU-TV (later WAGT) in Augusta, Georgia, made it to air. WATU-TV was a profitable operation; in comparison, debts incurred in starting WCTU-TV would prompt Twisdale to shelve his Memphis and Richmond plans.

WCTU was initially a low-budget independent station operating about eight hours a day from 3 to 11 p.m. It ran a lineup of some very old movies, westerns, some comedy shows from the early 1950s, and public affairs shows. The station, which operated from studios on Hood Road in the Hickory Grove neighborhood of Charlotte, had very modern equipment for the time and broadcast some shows and movies in color, as well as all of its local programming in color.

The station hit hard times financially in 1969. In July, equipment supplier Ampex filed two lawsuits seeking $1.3 million from WCTU-TV for failing to pay for products it had purchased from them. Film distributor National Telefilm Associates had also sued channel 36 for $80,000 for breaching a film rental contract. That September, a court placed WCTU into receivership, though it continued to broadcast. Stating that "we feel there have been combined forces which hinder our operation", Twisdale foreshadowed a years-long antitrust case against the Jefferson-Pilot Corporation, owner of WBTV, which was not fully dismissed until 1977.

=== The Turner turnaround ===
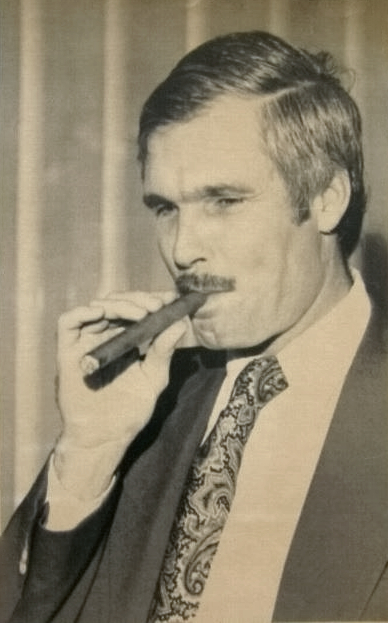
Ted Turner, c. 1976

While the station was in receivership, it came to the attention of Lee McClurkin, an Atlanta advertising executive and friend of Ted Turner. Turner owned WJRJ-TV in Atlanta, an independent station prone to equipment breakdowns. The idea was to buy the station for equipment and parts: McClurkin later recalled that "we went up there to cannibalize the station". Turner and McClurkin visited Charlotte and had lunch with Twisdale, during which he began to think about buying and operating WCTU against the wishes of his advisers. The board of Turner Communications opted not to pursue the deal, leaving Turner to pay for it on his own in cash. At the time, Turner's media interests consisted of WJRJ-TV, an outdoor advertising company, and four radio stations in other Southeastern cities. Turner renamed the station WRET-TV—using the initials of his full name, Robert Edward Turner III—in July and instituted a new and expanded program lineup in August. Just two programs, wrestling and the music video program The Now Explosion, were retained.

Turner's new Charlotte station was not an immediate success. Programming costs were high relative to ratings. The station had just one on-air personality: announcer Bob Chesson, who as "Dead Ernest" hosted the station's block of horror films. One Saturday morning in February 1972, Turner appeared on the station to appeal for contributions from viewers, saying that channel 36 had not broken even since he had purchased it. The station drew $53,000 in donations, enough to help pay its bills, and also received interest from several new advertisers. WRET-TV became a typical UHF independent, airing a lineup of cartoons, sitcoms, older movies, and a heavy slate of sporting events. It was among the early carriers of The 700 Club, produced by the Christian Broadcasting Network (CBN); CBN founder Pat Robertson, who like Turner had gone to Brown University, read about the appeal for donations in The Wall Street Journal and placed his programs on the station. At one point, the Charlotte area accounted for 15 percent of CBN's pledge contributions. CBN programming was dropped by WRET in 1973 and replaced with programs of the Trinity Broadcasting Network (TBN), headed locally by Jim Bakker; the shows included The PTL Club. Bakker split from TBN in 1974 and moved his staff to Charlotte.

By 1975, buoyed by a stronger film library, WRET-TV had emerged as the country's fifth-best independent station of 65 nationwide in audience share, per an analysis by Television/Radio Age, and was making a profit. After five years of being independently operated from the rest of Turner Communications Group, that company absorbed WRET-TV and its parent company later that year. Late that year, Turner was making plans to uplink one of its two stations nationwide for distribution to cable providers. While Turner preferred to uplink his Atlanta flagship, by then renamed, WRET-TV was a backup in the event that the Federal Communications Commission (FCC) did not relax rules that prevented the existence of superstations in top-25 television markets. Channel 36 ended the year by announcing plans to repay the viewers whose contributions had saved it four years prior, doing so in February 1976. Each of the 3,600 contributors, who had sent in from 25 cents to $200, received checks returning their money—with interest—from Turner.

In 1976 and 1977, channel 36 became an even more aggressive buyer of programming, grabbing local rights to Mary Hartman, Mary Hartman from WSOC-TV and stepping in to run CBS coverage of NBA basketball when WBTV passed on the package; it also aired other network shows that Charlotte's affiliates preempted. It was airing on 148 cable systems in the Carolinas, Tennessee, and Virginia. However, WRET-TV remained a laggard in news and public affairs programming. Its 15-minute sign-off newscast—the only such program on the station as an independent—was read by Bill Tush from Turner's headquarters in Atlanta and fed to Charlotte by telephone.

=== From independent to NBC affiliate ===
In 1977, ABC announced that it had lured longtime NBC affiliate WSOC-TV to be its new outlet in the Charlotte market beginning July 1, 1978, replacing WCCB-TV. That decision set off a two-station showdown between WCCB and WRET for the NBC affiliation in Charlotte. WCCB was seen as the favorite; unlike WRET, it had a functioning news department. Sources at NBC were said to see channel 36 as their last option behind WCCB, with its stronger signal, and long-dominant WBTV, which the network was trying to woo from CBS to no avail.

Turner, however, promised NBC that he would spend $2.5 million on station improvements if the network moved its programming to WRET. Of that total, $1 million would go towards starting a full scale news department within one year; the proposed expansion would employ 22 people, compared to 26 at WSOC and 12 at WCCB. On April 29, news broke that channel 36 had been selected for the NBC affiliation, with the network preferring it over WCCB based on Turner's turnaround record with the station and his ownership of the Atlanta Braves and Atlanta Hawks. With the decision, WCCB became an independent station.

Two months after assuming the NBC affiliation, WRET launched its first newscasts in September, under the banner of Action News; Robert D. Raiford was the station's first news anchor. The main news was presented at 7 p.m., but the different time slot failed to attract viewers. Where WBTV had a 52 share and WSOC a 23 for their 6 p.m. newscasts, WRET could only pull a 5. Bob Wisehart of the Charlotte News described WRET's news operation as "spend[ing] a great deal of effort going no place at all". The same could have been said of the station, which was said to be barely breaking even after the switch.

=== Group W era ===
Turner's ambitious and mostly successful ownership of the station would not last much longer after obtaining the NBC affiliation. By 1979, Turner was in the process of starting CNN, and he announced he would sell channel 36 to help raise the capital needed for the new venture. On May 16, 1979, the sale of WRET-TV to Westinghouse Broadcasting (also known as Group W) was announced for $20 million, setting a then-record for a single UHF television station. The news of a purchase by Group W, owner of regarded television and radio stations in other cities, was initially met with glee by the WRET-TV staff. Two station employees who had been looking for new jobs elsewhere decided to stay when the sale was announced. In 1984, Reese Schonfeld, who co-founded CNN with Turner, would note that by providing the collateral against which Turner obtained money for CNN in the WRET-TV purchase, Westinghouse financed the start of CNN and then of its own short-lived Satellite News Channel two years later.

Final approval of the sale was secured at the end of April 1980, when Westinghouse agreed to furnish $400,000 in grants and affirmative action programs in exchange for the withdrawal of a license renewal challenge by local civil rights groups; the FCC did find in their favor when it said the station did not employ enough minorities, renewing WRET-TV's license for a half-term of 18 months. Some of the funds went to improve the journalism school at the historically Black Johnson C. Smith University.

Westinghouse changed the station's call letters to WPCQ-TV, representing "People of the Carolinas and Queen City", on September 29; the station rebranded as "Q36" to go with the call sign change. The move came alongside a major programming reshuffle and an increase in effective radiated power from 1.3 to 2.5 million watts. The newscasts were moved from 6 and 11 p.m. to 5:30 p.m. and 12:30 a.m., and several new magazine shows were added, as was a Friday night public service-concept game show called Quibble, which was soon demoted to Saturdays. The early newscast was then moved back to 6 p.m., but WCCB, airing reruns of Good Times, drew 13 percent of the audience in May 1982 compared to the 2 percent that watched the WPCQ-TV newscast; the station was, again, losing money. Westinghouse's inability to make channel 36 more competitive surprised even local rivals, who had expected the company to do more with the station.

We spent a million dollars a year, 80 percent of it on the news, promoting the station since we took it over in 1980. But we never got over a 1 or 2 percent rating.

— Laurence Freiberg, president of the television station division of Group W, on the 1982 downsizing of WPCQ-TV's local news operation

In August 1982, the station made another programming change, this time attracting considerable national attention: it dropped its low-rated early evening newscast. When it axed that program, it also decided to cease carrying the NBC Nightly News. This prompted NBC officials to shop the Nightly News to Charlotte's other stations, including WBTV. The station continued with its noon newscast, as well as short news capsules throughout the day and occasional news specials. Station officials blamed WPCQ-TV's signal, which—despite the power increase—was not strong enough to reach outer areas of the market that got better signals from WXII-TV in Winston-Salem, North Carolina, and WIS-TV in Columbia, South Carolina. John J. Spinola, the general manager of the station, admitted that he was "pretty well encircled by NBC affiliates". Additionally, channel 36's studios were 30 minutes from downtown Charlotte, hindering its ability to establish an identity.

If this is Westinghouse's idea of how to run a television station, you wish they'd have stayed in the refrigerator business.

— Mark Wolf, TV/radio columnist, The Charlotte Observer

"Q36" became known for frequent preemptions of NBC network fare, including the soap opera Texas, coverage of the 1984 Democratic National Convention, and network sporting events. It also delayed the David Brinkley-hosted NBC Magazine to midnight to air its own Action News Magazine. Even Westinghouse's own productions were not guaranteed an audience on the station; after two years of WPCQ-TV airing Hour Magazine, it moved to WBTV in 1982.

Seeing little positive progress with WPCQ-TV, Westinghouse soon chose to use the station's low expectations to their advantage elsewhere in the company. Westinghouse had long extensively promoted from within and thus used WPCQ as the equivalent of a "farm team" for its larger stations. Its more promising on-air personalities merely treated WPCQ as a stepping stone towards promotion to Group W's well-regarded heritage radio and television stations outside Charlotte, such as when sports director Lou Tilley moved to Boston to become the weekend sports anchor at WBZ-TV. Amanda Davis, who had anchored the news for three years at WPCQ-TV, became a correspondent for Group W's Satellite News Channel after turning down an offer to report for its Baltimore station, WJZ-TV. When a union strike at the company's New York City all-news station, WINS, left it without announcers, Westinghouse sent WPCQ anchor Raiford there as part of a team of 20 employees from other Group W stations to keep it running.

=== A new Odyssey ===
Odyssey Partners, a New York investment partnership headed by Michael Finkelstein, acquired WPCQ-TV in 1984 after four years of Westinghouse ownership. For Westinghouse, the move was about focusing on major markets and shedding a station that was estimated to have lost $5 million in four years; Charlie Hanna, writing in Variety the year before, noted that Westinghouse had seemed to lose its "gung-hoism" for the station. Mark Wolf, television and radio columnist for The Charlotte Observer, would note that elements that Group W had used successfully elsewhere had failed to make a dent against two formidable and entrenched competitors in Charlotte, and that the company seemed to lack other ideas when its typical plans did not work.

When the sale closed in February 1985, Odyssey immediately announced the restoration of the NBC Nightly News to the station's schedule. Later that year, talk began of the potential return of local newscasts when station general manager Stan Rudick said that channel 36 was conducting market research on the idea. The station had reason to get back in the news game, as Charlotte was being cited as a potential market for NBC to move its affiliation. In February 1986, the station announced it would return to producing evening newscasts.

Following a $2 million investment, 5:30 and 11 p.m. news programs began airing September 8, 1986, anchored by former Atlanta newsman John McKnight and Karen Adams. Ratings were low but exceeded the levels of Action News in the Group W era. The original 36 News early evening newscast expanded to an hour and became News 36 in May 1988 in what amounted to a soft reboot of the operation. The revamp brought a string of new faces, notably including weekend sports anchor Hannah Storm.

Odyssey also implemented a technical overhaul for WPCQ-TV. In 1987, the station bought land north of Dallas to build a new tower near those owned by WBTV and newly built WJZY and filed to increase its power to the maximum 5 million watts. After surviving an attempt by NBC to move its affiliation from channel 36, in which NBC attempted to court both Charlotte VHF stations and the new WJZY, the new tower and stronger signal were activated in September 1988, giving WPCQ-TV signal parity with the other Charlotte stations.

=== Providence Journal ===
The Providence Journal Company (ProJo) purchased WPCQ-TV in 1988 for $30 million, marking its fourth television station purchase. ProJo immediately set out to build a new identity for the station. After initially pursuing the call letters WPJB-TV, formerly used by the Journal's Providence radio stations, the station instead became WCNC-TV (for "Charlotte, North Carolina") on September 3, 1989. That same day, the station split its 5:30 p.m. news hour into two half-hour newscasts, and it also moved to cable channel 6 on most area systems. The station also built new studios, costing $6.5 million, on Billy Graham Parkway in the Wood Ridge office complex, where it would be joined by the new headquarters of the NBC News Channel affiliate service, which general manager John Hayes had successfully lured to Charlotte. ProJo also sprung for a new satellite truck, the only one in the market, and overnight ratings for the Charlotte market. The early months of NBC Nightside, an NBC News Channel production, came from the new WCNC set. Despite all the improvements, WCNC's news remained firmly in third.

Beginning in 1996, the station was branded on-air as "NBC 6", in reference to its cable channel location; it quietly shed that moniker to go by its call letters in 2004, seeking to avoid potential confusion in ratings diaries.

=== Belo ownership ===
Two veteran anchors are gone, news ratings are perennially low and national consultants say the NBC affiliate is among the network's most dubious underachievers.

— Erik Spanberg, Charlotte Business Journal, on the state of WCNC-TV at the time of the Belo purchase

In 1996, the Belo Corporation bought the Providence Journal Company. The station suffered from two anchor departures in just over a week in early 1997 as Belo completed the purchase; meanwhile, its newscasts were still in third place. Under new general manager Richard Keilty, WCNC lured Sonja Gantt, formerly of WBTV, back to the market from a stint in Chicago. The station also got a new $200,000 news set as Belo sought to raise the station from its perennial cellar.

The next year, Ray Boylan, a longtime meteorologist at WSOC-TV, unretired and did on-air reports on WCNC, while the station also hired Terri Bennett, who had been in the running to replace him on channel 9 but was passed over. Boylan and Bennett were backed up by the station's purchase of a new Doppler radar and other weather equipment. However, not all of the talent changes made were positively received; the ouster of Beatrice Thompson, who had been Charlotte's first full-time Black anchor at WBTV in the 1980s, led to protests by some viewers who felt she had been forced out because of her race.

Boylan retired in December 2000. The station showed momentum in local news ratings in the early 2000s, particularly in mornings and at 11 p.m., and between 2000 and 2002, it produced a 10 p.m. newscast for WB affiliate WFVT-TV.

On October 30, 2009, WCNC broke the record for most Halloween costume changes during a local news program, with 11 costumes worn by the station's anchor team (Jeff Campbell, Colleen Odegaard, and Larry Sprinkle, as well as producer Natalie Ridley) were involved in setting the record during its weekday morning newscast that day.

Previous logo from 2014 until early-2020.

In 2008, after referring to itself simply with its call letters and using the slogan "Carolinas' News Connection", WCNC changed its branding to "NewsChannel 36", citing its over-the-air channel number and the coming arrival of digital television. In 2012, the station's branding was changed once again to "NBC Charlotte"; this time, the reasoning for the change was that few people actually watched the station over-the-air or on satellite on virtual channel 36.

=== Gannett/Tegna ownership ===
On June 13, 2013, the Gannett Company announced that it would acquire Belo for $1.5 billion. The sale was finalized on December 23. Investments made by Gannett in WCNC after the Belo purchase included the conversion of newscasts to high definition and a new computer system for the newsroom.

On June 29, 2015, Gannett split in two, with one side specializing in print media and the other side specializing in broadcast and digital media. WCNC, by that time rebranded back to its call letters, was retained by the latter company, named Tegna.

=== Nexstar ownership ===
Nexstar Media Group, the owner of WJZY and WMYT-TV in the Charlotte market, acquired Tegna in a deal announced in August 2025 and completed on March 19, 2026. A temporary restraining order issued one week later by the U.S. District Court for the Eastern District of California, later escalated to a preliminary injunction, has prevented WCNC from being integrated into WJZY and WMYT.

== Newscasts ==
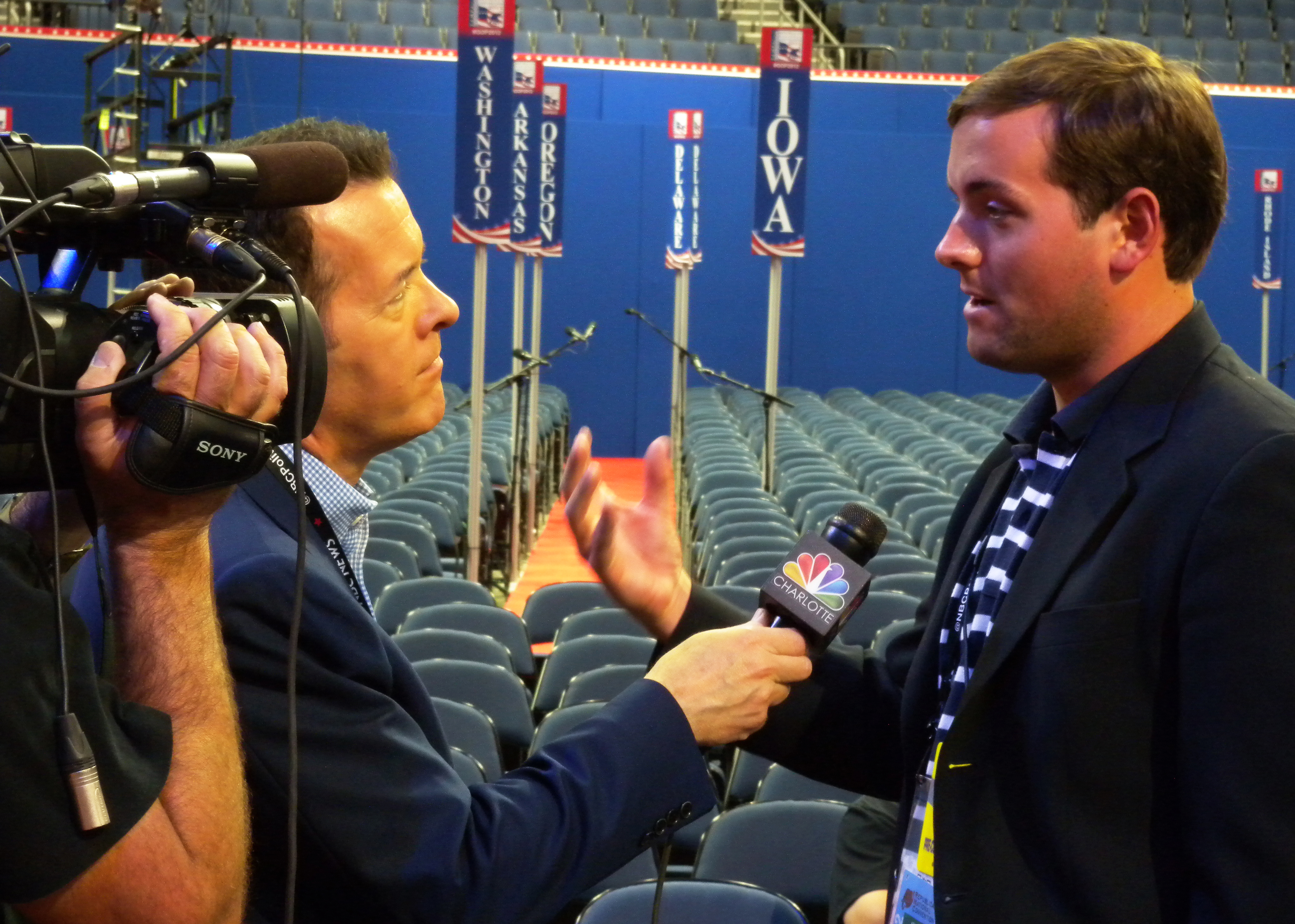
WCNC anchor Dave Wagner interviewing NBC News correspondent Luke Russert during the 2012 Republican National Convention.

After a solid, if low-rated, start under Turner's watch, the news department was severely hamstrung by Group W's bargain-basement approach to running the station. Group W immediately dropped the station's weekend evening newscasts and moved the 11 p.m. newscast to 12:30 a.m. before canceling it altogether in 1981. The early evening newscast was shifted between the 5:30 and 6 p.m. timeslots until the fall of 1982, when it was canceled as well. For the remainder of Group W's ownership, the station's only remaining local news programming consisted of a half-hour newscast at noon, hourly cut-ins, five-minute local inserts during Today, a weekly magazine program, and occasional specials.

After Odyssey Partners bought the station, the noon newscast was discontinued in the spring of 1985. In September 1986, WPCQ relaunched a full-fledged news department. At first, the station scheduled its early-evening newscast for 5:30 p.m., knowing at the time that it could not hope to compete with WBTV and WSOC-TV at 6 p.m. In 1988, WPCQ expanded the 5:30 newscast to one hour and added a 6 p.m. newscast on weekends. After becoming WCNC, the station added a distinct 6 p.m. newscast to the weeknight schedule. Under Belo, the station expanded further into new timeslots in the late 1990s, including a 5 a.m. morning show, unusual at the time.

In 1999, the station's news department was chronicled in the five-part PBS documentary series Local News. That same year, WCNC entered into a news share agreement with then-Fox affiliate WCCB to take over production of that station's 10 p.m. newscast, shortly after WSOC-TV ended its agreement to produce the program after WCCB announced it would launch its own news department. After WCCB's in-house news operation launched in 2000, WCNC began airing a 10 p.m. newscast on WB affiliate WWWB (channel 55, now WMYT-TV), which ran until the program was canceled due to low ratings in 2002. The station won a Peabody Award in 2003, the first for a Charlotte television station in 27 years, for an investigation into dental care through Medicaid and attracted notice in the market for its award-winning ways.

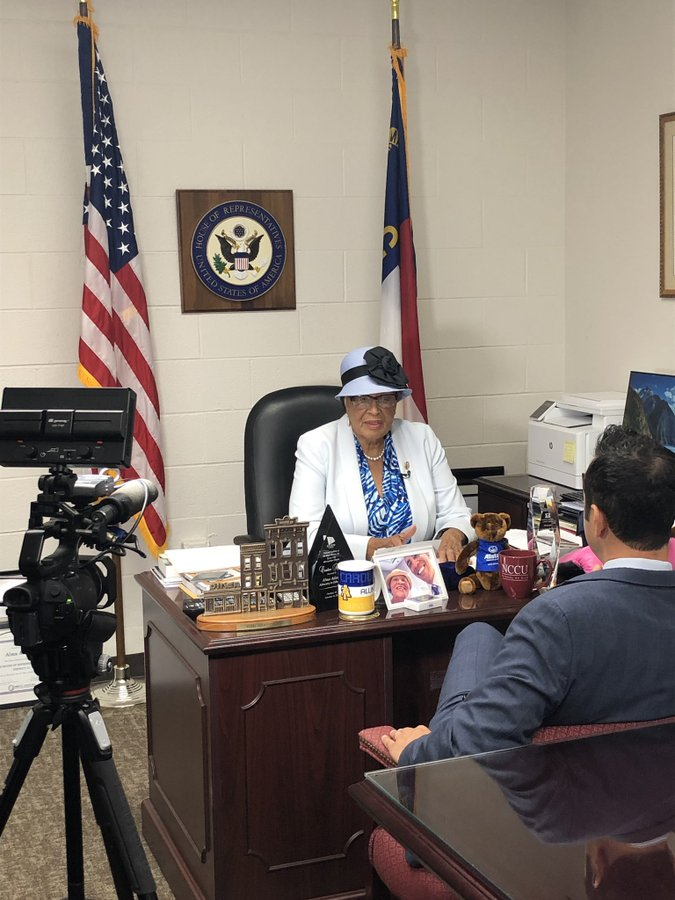
Rep. Alma Adams being interviewed by WCNC reporter Nate Morabito.

For much of the 2000s, WCNC had waged a spirited battle with WBTV for second place behind WSOC-TV, though it would later return to a distant third place in most timeslots as the performance of the NBC network in the late 2000s and poor daytime syndicated offerings dragged it down. This continued in the February 2016 sweeps, when its evening newscasts drew barely half the viewership of WBTV.

In late 2005, WCNC debuted the Charlotte market's first 4:30 p.m. newscast, creating a two-hour local news block from 4:30 to 6:30 p.m. In 2007, the station phased out its longtime 6News brand and rebranded itself as "WCNC, Carolinas' News Connection". In August 2008, it rebranded once again to NewsChannel 36, marking the first time in 12 years that WCNC had used its over-the-air channel number in its branding. Beginning in September 2008, WCNC aired news at 4 p.m., with Judge Judy at 4:30; in January 2012, the 4 p.m. news expanded to an hour and the noon news shrank from an hour to 30 minutes. The station began producing Charlotte Today, an hour-long entertainment and lifestyle program, in 2010, airing weekdays at 11 a.m.

On May 18, 2009, WCNC began broadcasting its local newscasts in 16:9 widescreen standard definition; this change came alongside the revamping of the station's on-air news graphics. A conversion to full high definition followed on June 28, 2014.

=== Notable current on-air staff ===
- Sarah French – anchor
- Brad Panovich – meteorologist (since 2003), chief meteorologist since 2008

=== Notable former on-air staff ===
- Heather Childers – weekend anchor, 1992–1995
- Amanda Davis – reporter, 1979–1982
- Allen Denton – anchor, 1996–2000
- Doug McKelway – reporter, 1980–1982
- Bob Raiford – anchor and talk show host, 1978–1986
- Hannah Storm – sports anchor, 1988–1989
- Beatrice Thompson – general assignment reporter, 1988–1989
- Beth Troutman – news anchor, 2015–2017

== Technical information and subchannels ==
WCNC-TV's transmitter is located in north-central Gaston County. The station's signal is multiplexed:

Subchannels of WCNC-TV
Subchannel	Res.	Short name	Programming
36.1	1080i	WCNC-HD	NBC
36.2	480i	Crime	True Crime Network
36.3	480i	CourtTV	Court TV
36.4	480i	Quest	Quest
36.5	480i	NEST	The Nest
64.2	480i	Laff	Laff (WAXN-DT2)

Broadcast on behalf of another station

Prior subchannel offerings from WCNC have included NBC Weather Plus and the Live Well Network.

WCNC-TV was added to Charlotte's ATSC 3.0 (NextGen TV) deployment on WAXN-TV on July 7, 2021. As part of the change, WAXN's 64.4 subchannel of Laff was placed on WCNC-TV's multiplex, keeping it available in ATSC 1.0 format.

=== Analog-to-digital conversion ===
WCNC-TV began digital transmission on November 1, 1999, and shut down its analog signal, over UHF channel 36, on the official digital transition date of June 12, 2009. The station's digital signal remained on its pre-transition UHF channel 22, continuing to use virtual channel 36.

WCNC-TV moved its digital signal from channel 22 to channel 24 on September 6, 2019, as part of the FCC's spectrum reallocation process.

=== Translators ===
WCNC-TV's signal is additionally rebroadcast over the following translators:

- Biscoe: W36FB-D
- Lilesville–Wadesboro: W17EE-D

== See also ==
- Channel 6 branded TV stations in the United States
- Channel 24 digital TV stations in the United States
- Channel 36 virtual TV stations in the United States

== Bibliography ==
Goldberg, Robert; Goldberg, Gerald Jay (1995). Citizen Turner: the wild rise of an American tycoon (1st ed.). New York: Harcourt Brace. ISBN 978-0-15-118008-0.
