= Brad Panovich =

American meteorologist

- Born: near Cleveland, Ohio, U.S.
- Citizenship: United States
- Education: Ohio State University (BSc)
- Occupation: Meteorologist
- Employer: WCNC-TV
- Known for: Chief Meteorologist at WCNC-TV weather education and social media engagement
- Awards: American Meteorological Society Award for Broadcast Meteorology (2017); National Weather Association Special Appreciation Award (2025)

Brad Panovich is an American meteorologist currently serving as the chief meteorologist for WCNC-TV, the NBC affiliate in Charlotte, North Carolina. He is a fellow of the American Meteorological Society (AMS) and is recognized for his "Weather IQ" educational platform and his extensive use of social media to communicate complex atmospheric science topics to the public. In 2017, he received the AMS Award for Broadcast Meteorology, the highest national honor for a broadcast meteorologist.

== Early life and education ==
Panovich was raised outside of Cleveland, Ohio, and became interested in meteorology after experiencing the Great Blizzard of 1978. He attended Ohio State University, where he participated in storm chasing research during his junior and senior years. He graduated with a Bachelor of Science degree in meteorology.

== Career ==
Panovich began his career at stations in Dayton, Ohio (WKEF-TV) and Cadillac, Michigan (WGKI-TV). He later joined WWL-TV in New Orleans as a weekend meteorologist. While at WWL, he covered tropical weather and returned to the station in 2005 to assist during the aftermath of Hurricane Katrina.

In 2003, Panovich was hired as a meteorologist at WCNC-TV in Charlotte, rising to chief meteorologist in 2008. He also serves as a part-time instructor at the University of North Carolina at Charlotte in the department of earth, environmental and geographical sciences. Additionally, he provides seasonal winter forecasts for the regional website SkiSoutheast.

== Awards and recognition ==
- 2017: AMS Award for Broadcast Meteorology, for his devotion to informing his audience and for innovative use of social media.
- 2019-2025: Named "Best Weather Forecaster" by Charlotte Magazine for seven consecutive years.
- 2025: National Weather Association Special Appreciation Award, for his work in disaster recovery following Hurricane Helene.
