= Satellite News Channel =

American cable news television channel

- Country: United States
- Broadcast area: Nationwide
- Headquarters: Stamford, Connecticut

Programming
- Language: English
- Picture format: 480i (SDTV)

Ownership
- Owner: ABC Video Enterprises Inc. (American Broadcasting Companies, Inc.) / Group W Satellite Communications (Westinghouse Broadcasting Company)

History
- Launched: June 21, 1982
- Closed: October 27, 1983 (1 year, 4 months and 6 days)
- Replaced by: CNN Headline News (assumed SNC's subscriber base on systems that carried the channel)

Satellite News Channel (SNC) was an American short-lived news-based cable television channel that was operated as a joint venture between the ABC Video Enterprises division of American Broadcasting Companies, Inc. (a.k.a. ABC) and the Group W Satellite Communications subsidiary of Westinghouse Broadcasting Company (a.k.a. Group W). Designed as a satellite-delivered cable network, the channel is best remembered as the first 24-hour news cable competition to the Cable News Network (CNN). SNC's headquarters were based in the New York City suburb of Stamford, Connecticut.

The channel's format consisted of 18-minute-long rotating newscasts with the remaining time in each half-hour block allocated for a regional news summary; this lent credence to SNC's slogan, "Give us 18 minutes, we'll give you the world," which was derived through Group W's experience in all-news radio. Each 18-minute national newscast featured content gathered from both in-house newsgathering and reporting staffs and reports sourced from international television networks that maintained content agreements with ABC/Group W to supply stories for the channel. The regional summaries were sectioned by "zones", and often originated from either ABC affiliates (such as KOMO-TV in Seattle) or Group W stations (such as KDKA-TV in Pittsburgh).

== History ==
ABC Video Enterprises and Group W Satellite Communications announced the formation of the Satellite News Channel on August 12, 1981, with a tentative launch set for early 1982. CNN founder Ted Turner subsequently announced plans to launch a spin-off service, CNN2 (later renamed CNN Headline News shortly after SNC's launch; it is now named HLN), which originally maintained a format similar to that being planned by the Satellite News Channel – albeit with newscasts running in 30-minute intervals – as a preemptive strike against the ABC/Group W venture. CNN2 made its launch on January 1, 1982, on participating cable systems across the county as well as through a sneak preview block on sister channel Superstation WTBS.

Satellite News Channel launched on June 21, 1982. During that time, it provided competition for CNN, the first cable network to do so at the time. The network utilized footage from ABC News for its reports and maintained seven newsgathering and reporting crews based in Washington, D.C. At launch, Satellite News Channel compensated participating cable operators to carry the channel, contrary to the standard of the period in which cable channels charged a nominal fee per subscriber for carriage. Despite this model, SNC had difficulty obtaining clearance from cable systems. The network and its satellite transponder space was eventually purchased by CNN's corporate parent, the Turner Broadcasting System. Satellite News Channel ceased operations on October 27, 1983, after sixteen months on the air; most local cable systems replaced SNC with either CNN or, more commonly, CNN Headline News.

== Notable staff ==
=== Reporters ===
- Ken Alvord
- Dan Breinholt
- Lyn Brown
- Charles Crawford
- Amanda Davis
- Solon Gray
- Jose Grinan
- Carol Iovanna
- R.D. Sahl
- Deborah Stone
- Laurel Ornish
- Jackson Bain

=== Field correspondents ===
- Jon Bascom
- Lou Cioffi
- Andy Gastmeyer
- Carolyn Gorman
- Mike Ritz
- Joe Sanchez
- Steve Taylor

=== BusinessWeek ===
- Kathleen Campion
- Jeff Simmons

=== Meteorologists ===
- Keith Eichner
- Todd Gross
- Alan Kasper
- Jeff Pylant
- Bob Richards
- Arnie Rosen
- Paul Douglas
- Valerie Voss

=== Sportscasters ===
- Jim Brinson
- Dan Carney
- Jim Donovan
- Marc Goldberg
- Frank Gorin
- Larry Sacknoff
- Dave Sims

=== Entertainment ===
- Joe Ricci

=== Graphic Designers ===
- Billy Sunshine
- Cathe Ishino
- Judy Rosenfeld
- Daryl Deangelo
- Janet Scabrini
- Nat Zimmerman
- Martin Hara
- Robert E. Moran
- Debra Klein
- Maureen Nappi
- Jan Helsel

== After the closure – successor channels ==
For a brief time after SNC shut down, its theme music was used by fellow Connecticut cable network ESPN.

Starting in 1989, All News Channel (ANC) was an American satellite television news channel owned by CONUS Communications, a joint venture between Viacom and Hubbard Broadcasting. The channel was carried mainly on direct-broadcast satellite provider DirecTV (and prior to that, USSB, which was folded into DirecTV in 1999). All News Channel's programming was also syndicated to television stations across the United States. The channel was headquartered in St. Paul, Minnesota. The channel ceased broadcasting on September 30, 2002.

In 1996, ABC revealed plans to launch a 24-hour news channel but discontinued them after Fox News Channel and MSNBC were announced.

In 2004, ABC News returned to the 24-hour news market with ABC News Now. The channel began as a digital subchannel but was later moved to cable. However that channel like SNC received little cable and satellite carriage, only being available on regional cable systems and Sprint's mobile devices. After nine years in operation, it was shut down.

In 2013 ABC News partnered with Univision Communications to launch Fusion, a new cable news channel focused on a Hispanic audience with shows skewed to a younger demographic which also includes satire and entertainment programs. The channel went live on October 28, 2013. The channel is ABC's third attempt at a cable news channel and their second partnership on one, the first since SNC. As far as distribution, Fusion has fared much better in respects to carriage than its two predecessors, securing both major satellite carriers and major cable operators in markets like New York City. ABC News' parent company, the Walt Disney Company, sold its stake in Fusion to Univision. It has since been owned by the Fusion Media Group, which is a division of Univision. Fusion ceased to exist at the end of 2021.

== See also ==
- List of United States cable and satellite television networks
- Westinghouse Broadcasting
