= Occupy Charlotte =

Protesters in the U.S. state of North Carolina

- Part of the Occupy movement
- Date: October 3, 2011 – 2012
- Location: Charlotte, North Carolina
- Caused by: Economic inequality, Democracy, Racism, Sexism, Classism, Anarchism, Corporate influence over government, inter alia.
- Goals: Freedom, Justice, Democracy,
- Methods: Demonstration, occupation, protest, street protesters, Civil Disobedience, Direct Action
- Status: Occupation ended, protests continued

Occupy Charlotte was a collective of protesters that settled on September 30, 2011, in Charlotte, North Carolina, in front of the old city hall. It is related to the Occupy Wall Street movement that began in New York City on September 17, 2011 also protesting against economic inequity, corporate greed, and the influence of corporations and lobbyists on government. The movement also seeks to show that non-hierarchical consensus decision-making, direct action and mutual aid are preferable alternatives to current systems of power and control.

As of June 2012, Occupy Charlotte had continued to engage in organized meetings, events and actions.

== Overview ==
=== Slogan ===
The group's slogan "We are the 99%" is sourced from Occupy Wall Street, who shares the slogan, and refers to the growing financial division between the wealthy and the poor in America. The 99% refers to the average and majority American populous, while the 1% refers to the wealthy upper-class Americans.

=== Affiliations ===
Occupy Charlotte was inspired by and guided by the principles of the Occupy Wall Street (OWS) movement and act on its behalf. Occupy Charlotte recognizes the group "Anonymous" and its local "Anonymous North Carolina" group, and thank it for the support it has given Occupy Charlotte, but renounce any affiliation with the group.

=== Beliefs ===
Occupy Charlotte is a movement composed of smaller groups fighting against similar "injustices". While these groups maintain similar motives and beliefs, they fight against different specific establishments. Charlotte, being the banking mecca that it is, compels many of these groups to target banking groups such as Wells Fargo through their protests. The beliefs held by Occupy Charlotte are the same as those held by Occupy Wall Street. Their protests fight against the high unemployment rate, financial inequality, financial greed, governmental and financial corruption, and other such topics.

== Actions and protests ==
Occupy Charlotte first met on Oct 1, 2011 in Marshall Park; maintained a physical Occupation on the People's Lawn of Old City Hall (600 E Trade St) from Oct 8, 2011 until January 30, 2012; remained active in 2012 most notably through actions targeting local transportation fee increases, Duke Energy (allied with Greenpeace), North Carolina's Amendment 1, Bank of America (as part of the North Carolina Coalition Against Corporate Power and allied with others such as Rainforest Action Network), and ALEC (allied with the Voters' Legislative Transparency Project); re-Occupied Charlotte during the 2012 Democratic National Convention by securing camping space at Marshall Park; was part of the Coalition to March on Wall Street South which coordinated actions surrounding the DNC; last General Assembly with quorum was Sept 25, 2012; last Occupy Charlotte activity was birthday celebration on Oct 8, 2012. A group of activists whose roots contain the Occupy Charlotte Environmental Working Group still remains active (member's submission to InterOccupy survey, summer 2013).

Occupy Charlotte engages in nonviolent protests. On Friday, December 30, 2011, four men were charged with careless use of fire after they set two American flags on fire in front of the old City Hall. They claimed to be a part of the Occupy Charlotte organization, however an Occupy Charlotte member said, "There was no decision made by the group here to all get together and burn American Flags. It was a unilateral decision made by four individuals acting on their own."

== See also ==
- List of Occupy movement protest locations
