= WNEG =

Wneg or WNEG may refer to:

- WNEG (AM), a radio station (630 AM) licensed to Toccoa, Georgia, United States
- WTOC-FM, a radio station (96.3 FM) licensed to Clayton, Georgia, United States, that previously used the "WNEG-FM" call sign
- WGTA (TV), a television station (channel 32) licensed to Toccoa, Georgia, United States, that previously used the "WNEG-TV" call sign
- Weneg (pharaoh), Egyptian pharaoh of the second dynasty
