= WGHC =

WGHC may refer to:

== Callsigns ==
"GHC" in region W:

- WGHC-LP, a defunct low-power radio station (98.3 FM) formerly licensed to serve Chicago, Illinois, United States; see List of radio stations in Illinois
- WGHC (1400 AM), a defunct radio station (1400 AM), established as WNGA in 2008, formerly licensed to serve Clayton, Georgia, United States; that operated as WGHC (2009–2014)
- WGHC (FM), a defunct radio station (91.7 FM) formerly licensed to serve Tallulah Falls, Georgia, United States; see List of radio stations in Georgia (U.S. state)
- WTCG, a radio station (870 AM) licensed to serve Mount Holly, North Carolina, United States, which held the call sign WGHC from 1961 to 2009

== See also ==
- GHC (disambiguation)
