= GHC =

GHC may refer to:

== Education ==
- Georgia Highlands College, in Rome, Georgia, US
- Global Health College, in Alexandria, Virginia, US
- Grays Harbor College, in Aberdeen, Washington, US
- Granada Hills Charter High School, in Granada Hills, California, US

== Organisations ==
- Global Health Corps
- Global Health Council
- Group Health Cooperative
- Graham Holdings Company, an American conglomerate

== Technology ==
- Glasgow Haskell Compiler, a compiler for the functional programming language Haskell
- Global Hybrid Cooperation, a set of vehicle technologies
- Grace Hopper Celebration of Women in Computing
- Guitar Hero Carabiner, a gaming device
- Guarded Horn clause, in concurrent logic programming

== Other uses ==
- Guimarães Historic Centre, a UNESCO World Heritage Site
- Great Harbour Cay Airport (IATA airport code), in the Bahamas
- Hiberno-Scottish Gaelic, a language used in Ireland and Scotland from the 13th to the 18th century
- Global Honored Crown, the championships in the Japanese promotion Pro Wrestling Noah

== See also ==
- Ghanaian cedi (currency sign: GH₵), the currency of Ghana
- WGHC (disambiguation), including WGHC callsign GHC in region W
