= CW 69 =

CW 69 may refer to the following television stations in the U.S. formerly affiliated with The CW:

- KSWB-TV in San Diego, California (2006–2008)
- WUPA in Atlanta, Georgia (2006–2023)
