= WANF =

Television station in Atlanta

- Atlanta, Georgia; United States
- Channels: Digital: 19 (UHF); Virtual: 46
- Branding: Atlanta News First

Programming
- Affiliations: 46.1: Independent; for others, see § Subchannels

Ownership
- Owner: Gray Media; (Gray Television Licensee, LLC)
- Sister stations: WPCH-TV, WKTB-CD

History
- First air date: June 6, 1971
- Former call signs: WHAE-TV (1971–1977); WANX-TV (1977–1984); WGNX (1984–2000); WGCL-TV (2000–2022)
- Former channel number: Analog: 46 (UHF, 1971–2009)
- Former affiliations: Independent (1971–1994); CBS (1994–2025)
- Call sign meaning: "Atlanta News First"

Technical information
- Licensing authority: FCC
- Facility ID: 72120
- ERP: 1,000 kW
- HAAT: 329 m (1,079 ft)
- Transmitter coordinates: 33°48′26.4″N 84°20′21.5″W

Links
- Public license information: Public file; LMS
- Website: www.atlantanewsfirst.com

WANF (channel 46), branded as Atlanta News First, is an independent television station in Atlanta, Georgia, United States. It is the flagship property of locally based Gray Media and is co-owned with CW affiliate WPCH-TV (channel 17) and low-power, Class A Telemundo affiliate WKTB-CD (channel 47). WANF and WPCH-TV share studios on 14th Street Northwest in Atlanta's Home Park neighborhood, while WANF's transmitter is located in the city's Woodland Hills section.

The station was built in 1971 as WHAE-TV (later WANX-TV), owned by the Christian Broadcasting Network (CBN). Originally a nonprofit operation airing religious programs, the station gradually became a more commercially oriented independent station and broadened its programming to include older movies and family-friendly classic TV shows. CBN sold the station to Tribune Broadcasting in 1983, and the call sign was changed to WGNX in 1984. Tribune substantially built up the station, upgrading programming and turning it into Atlanta's top-rated local independent station; it also started a local newscast for the station in January 1989.

After a major switch of television affiliations in Atlanta in 1994, WGNX became Atlanta's new CBS affiliate and the only such station owned by Tribune. However, news was not seriously expanded until after Meredith Corporation acquired the station in 1999 as part of a purchase-and-trade with Tribune. The WGCL-TV call sign was adopted in 2000 as part of a major, but short-lived, rebrand of the station to "Clear TV" and its newscasts to Clear News. Meredith also assumed operating control of WPCH-TV in 2011, purchasing the station outright in 2017. Over the course of its tenure with CBS, the station was generally a revolving door of management and presenting talent with little ratings success, frequently drawing the lowest ratings of Atlanta's news-producing stations.

The acquisition of the Meredith Local Media division by Gray Media in 2021 resulted in an increased infusion of resources into the station's newsroom as well as other investments by Gray in Atlanta-area media. As part of a wide-scale rebrand of its news service to Atlanta News First, WGCL-TV changed its call sign to WANF on October 3, 2022. The station disaffiliated from CBS on August 16, 2025, when CBS programming moved to the owned-and-operated WUPA (channel 69).

== History ==
=== Early years (1971–1994) ===
==== Construction and CBN ownership ====
On January 23, 1968, the Christian Broadcasting Network (CBN), owned by evangelist Pat Robertson, filed an application with the Federal Communications Commission (FCC) for authority to build a new television station on channel 46 in Atlanta. The application was granted on May 5, 1968, but after several changes in the proposed studio location, the station began broadcasting on June 6, 1971, as WHAE-TV from leased studio facilities in the Protestant Radio and TV Center on Clifton Road. Originally, it operated for six hours a day on weekdays and twelve on Sundays. It was largely an unprofitable operation with, as John Carman writing for The Atlanta Constitution put it, "no particular interest in profits". On September 3, 1977, WHAE-TV changed its call sign to WANX-TV, with a station spokesman stating it wanted "a new identity" and a "fresh start". (Note: CBN had filed to change the call sign two years prior, in 1975, to WXAT-TV. The FCC initially granted the call sign but set aside the grant in January 1976 upon receiving an objection from Radioad, Inc., owners of local radio station WXAP (860 AM). One source mentioned in a 1984 newspaper article stated "ANX" stood for "Atlanta Needs Christ".)

Over the course of the 1970s and early 1980s, WHAE-TV/WANX-TV, like other CBN independent stations, eventually adopted a program schedule consisting of older, "family-friendly" classic shows as well as some religious programming, such as CBN's The 700 Club. Movies, a common staple of independents, had been completely absent from the station's lineup until 1974, when the outlet moved into studios on Briarcliff Road that had been vacated by WATL (channel 36), which had been temporarily shuttered in 1971, and thereafter owned by Production 70s, a video production house that declared bankruptcy. This facility had been built around a 1916 red clapboard house. It also began to operate on a more commercial basis in 1980, following a restructuring of the CBN media operation into the commercially authorized Continental Broadcasting Network, turning its first-ever profit in 1982. By 1983, it had tied WTBS (channel 17), Ted Turner's independent-turned-superstation, in the local ratings, and The 700 Club was the only religious program on its weekday lineup.

==== Tribune ownership ====
In July 1983, Tribune Broadcasting of Chicago announced it would spend $32 million to purchase WANX-TV from CBN. It was the company's fifth station, purchased as CBN was seeking to raise money for other operations and retire some of its debts. On March 15, 1984, the call sign was changed to WGNX, stated to be a mixture of the call signs of Tribune stations WGN-TV in Chicago and WPIX in New York City.

WGNX emerged as the number-one local independent in Atlanta under Tribune's ownership. A reported $40 million in program expenditures lifted costs market-wide for syndicated shows and gave channel 46 a stronger lineup. With $19 million in revenue for 1985, WGNX more than doubled the billing of its primary competitor, WATL. WATL, which engineered its own rise to viability in the late 1980s, and WGNX gave Atlanta its first serious local independent stations. Atlanta Hawks basketball moved from WVEU (channel 69) to WGNX in the 1986–87 season.

In November 1993, Tribune committed to the new WB Television Network, to be launched by Warner Bros. Television in January 1995. Tribune would hold an ownership stake, and six of the company's seven independent stations, including WGNX, were initially to join at launch.

=== As a CBS station (1994–2025) ===
==== A last-minute big switch ====
On May 23, 1994, New World Communications signed a long-term agreement to affiliate its nine CBS-, ABC- or NBC-affiliated television stations with Fox, which had just acquired the television rights to the National Football Conference (NFC) of the National Football League. New World had a uniquely suited portfolio for Fox. Many of its stations were CBS affiliates in NFC markets—including Atlanta, where it owned WAGA-TV (channel 5); Fox would sell WATL, which it had purchased and where a news department had been partially set up.

Rumors began to circulate wildly in the local industry following the announcement of the New World/Fox deal. General manager Herman Ramsey wrote a memo to his staff: "Have you ever heard so many rumors in a week and a half? ... I believe that the likelihood of WGNX affiliating with any network other than Warner Brothers in January '95 is small." Behind the scenes, however, Ramsey was lobbying Tribune to pursue the CBS affiliation for WGNX. CBS considered buying WGNX outright but was reluctant to pay Tribune's asking price.

By September, CBS had not found a replacement affiliate in Atlanta even though WAGA was due to join Fox at the end of the year. More or less out of desperation, CBS purchased WVEU for $22 million. However, CBS only took cursory steps toward closing the purchase in hopes of finding a higher-profile outlet in Atlanta, even if it was only an affiliate. It continued to negotiate with Fox and Tribune. By mid-November, with only a month to go before WAGA was due to switch to Fox, CBS had not filed paperwork to purchase channel 69 at the FCC and refused to confirm that it was still moving forward with the deal.

On November 16, CBS announced that it would not be moving to WVEU but instead to WGNX. CBS preferred to have its programming on a station that already aired local news, and WGNX was the only independent station in the market with a functioning news department. Had CBS moved its programming to WVEU, it would have faced the prospect of a sharp drop in local ratings for the CBS Evening News until it could build a local news department for channel 69. Setting up a news department would have been a part of an unprecedented campaign to promote WVEU and build its facilities to a level commensurate with its new status as a CBS owned-and-operated station. One consultant interviewed by The Atlanta Journal and Constitution estimated CBS would have had to spend close to $100 million to build out WVEU.

According to a postmortem by Phil Kloer in The Journal and Constitution, CBS had only bought WVEU as a "safety net" in the event it was unable to partner with a higher-profile replacement for WAGA-TV. In spite of having found one, CBS went through with its purchase of WVEU and immediately put it back on the market. Additionally, WATL was sold to Qwest Broadcasting (a joint venture between music producer Quincy Jones, former NFL defensive end Willie Davis, television producer Don Cornelius, television host Geraldo Rivera, and Tribune) in a two-station, $167-million deal, affiliating with The WB.

WGNX became Atlanta's new CBS affiliate on December 11, 1994. Unlike WAGA-TV, which preempted some CBS programs and delayed others, WGNX carried all CBS programs at their scheduled times. Coinciding with the swap, the Hawks immediately moved to WATL.

One problem CBS would have faced with its planned move to WVEU remained unchanged with the move to WGNX: the loss of viewership in northeastern Georgia. WGNX's UHF signal did not penetrate nearly as far into this area as WAGA-TV's VHF signal. For most of 1995, this left 72,000 viewers unable to watch CBS programming over-the-air. This shortfall was resolved in October 1995, when the network affiliated with WNEG-TV in Toccoa. While licensed to a city in the Greenville–Spartanburg, South Carolina–Asheville, North Carolina, market, WNEG-TV reached an area underserved by the network.

==== Meredith ownership ====
CBS 46 logo, used from 2014 to 2022; shown here is the 2020 variant

On August 23, 1998, Tribune Broadcasting announced it would sell WGNX to the Meredith Corporation for $370 million, as a three-way exchange deal in which Tribune would concurrently acquire Fox affiliate KCPQ in Tacoma, Washington, from Kelly Broadcasting. The trade made sense for Tribune and Meredith. Tribune's portfolio of stations at this point consisted entirely of Fox and WB affiliates outside of WGNX, while Meredith already owned several CBS stations. WGNX represented a rare opportunity to acquire a major station in a top-10 media market; the purchase made WGNX Meredith's largest station.

Meredith began to make aggressive changes in an attempt to turn around the laggard WGNX, a station described by Mediaweek magazine as "somewhat untended". Having long since outgrown its studio on Briarcliff, channel 46 began construction of new studios in Midtown as part of a plan to increase news output from 90 minutes a day to five hours.

On July 4, 2000, to reflect these changes, WGNX changed its station branding from "CBS Atlanta"—adopted the year prior in a recognition that the station was not channel 46 on cable—to "Clear TV" and adopted the call sign WGCL-TV. The station began broadcasting its newscasts from the Midtown studio on March 25, 2001.

After the resignation of Allen Shaklan, WGNX/WGCL-TV's first general manager under Meredith, in 2002, the station dropped the Clear News format and hired Sue Schwartz, who had last run KTVK in Phoenix. Kevin O'Brien, president of Meredith's television station group, identified turning WGCL-TV around as the company's number one priority.

Beginning in 2009, Meredith began to hub master control operations for its two other southeastern stations—WHNS in Greenville, South Carolina, and WSMV-TV in Nashville—at WGCL-TV. By 2011, the hub was handling eight of Meredith's twelve stations.

On January 18, 2011, Meredith Corporation entered into a local marketing agreement with the Turner Broadcasting System, owner of WPCH-TV, to assume operational control of the station and move its operations to the WGCL-TV studios. Production of the station's 45 Atlanta Braves broadcasts was also transferred from Turner Sports to Fox Sports South as a result. Meredith purchased the station outright from Turner's corporate parent, Time Warner, in 2017; as the only broadcast license held by the company, its divestiture was intended to remove a potential hurdle to the acquisition of Time Warner by AT&T. From 2011 to 2013, WGCL-TV was the preseason television home of the Atlanta Falcons, with games moving to WUPA in 2014.

=== Sale to Gray Television; relaunch as Atlanta News First ===
This is their home market. It will be their emblem market. They want this sucker to succeed.

— Michael Castengera, retired news consultant and University of Georgia professor

On May 3, 2021, Atlanta-based Gray Television announced its intent to purchase the Meredith Local Media division, including WGCL-TV and WPCH, for $2.7 billion. The sale was completed on December 1. For Gray, a company whose Georgia roots date to 1897, channel 46 became the company's flagship property and a springboard for major investments in Atlanta-area media. In 2022, Gray spent $30 million to acquire WKTB-CD, Atlanta's Telemundo affiliate and the largest independently owned Telemundo outlet in the eastern United States, and co-owned Surge Digital Media, a boutique digital advertising agency; former owner Susan Sim Oh joined Gray at the conclusion of the sale, and Gray announced plans to relocate Telemundo Atlanta from its studios in Duluth to WGCL-TV. It also acquired WKSY-LD, a low-power station licensed to Summerville and Trion.

In addition, in 2021, Gray acquired Third Rail Studios, a film and television production facility located on the site of the former General Motors Doraville Assembly plant in Doraville; it then announced a partnership with NBCUniversal to run Third Rail and a major expansion of the Assembly complex slated to be completed in 2023.

On August 31, 2022, Gray announced that WGCL-TV and WPCH's news programs would take on the umbrella brand of Atlanta News First on September 30, with WGCL-TV additionally changing its call sign to WANF on October 3. In interviews, multiple station executives commented that they did not consider this a "rebranding" but a "branding"; in their view, channel 46 had no brand at all when Gray took over. According to general manager Erik Schrader, Gray wanted to bill WANF as a station with a very deep connection to Atlanta and which was owned by a locally headquartered company.

Gray and the Atlanta Hawks reached a deal in December 2023 to broadcast 10 games during the 2023–24 season, primarily on Friday nights. All ten games would air on WPCH, with two of them simulcast by WANF. All games would be produced by Bally Sports Southeast. WANF continued to air such simulcasts, with 13 in total in the 2025–26 season.

=== Return to independence and sports rights ===
On June 2, 2025, Gray announced it would be ending WANF's CBS affiliation effective August 16. Gray planned to turn WANF into a news-intensive independent station. The CBS affiliation moved to network-owned WUPA.

WANF would air 25 Atlanta Braves games in 2026 as the lead station in Gray's regional Southeast network; the telecasts were simulcast from BravesVision, the Braves' newly launched in-house broadcasting division. The unit was itself a partnership with Gray subsidiary Raycom Sports; WANF also provided studio space for BravesVision, which was used for pre-game and post-game shows during away games.

With the closing of FanDuel Sports Network South/Southeast in 2026, Gray became the new television partner for the Atlanta Hawks with the 2026-27 season. To mark the multi-year deal, WANF rebranded for a day as "Atlanta Hawks First". The estimated annual rights fee to the Hawks of $8 to $10 million is a third of what the team had been receiving from the sports networks' owner, Main Street Sports Group.

== News operation ==
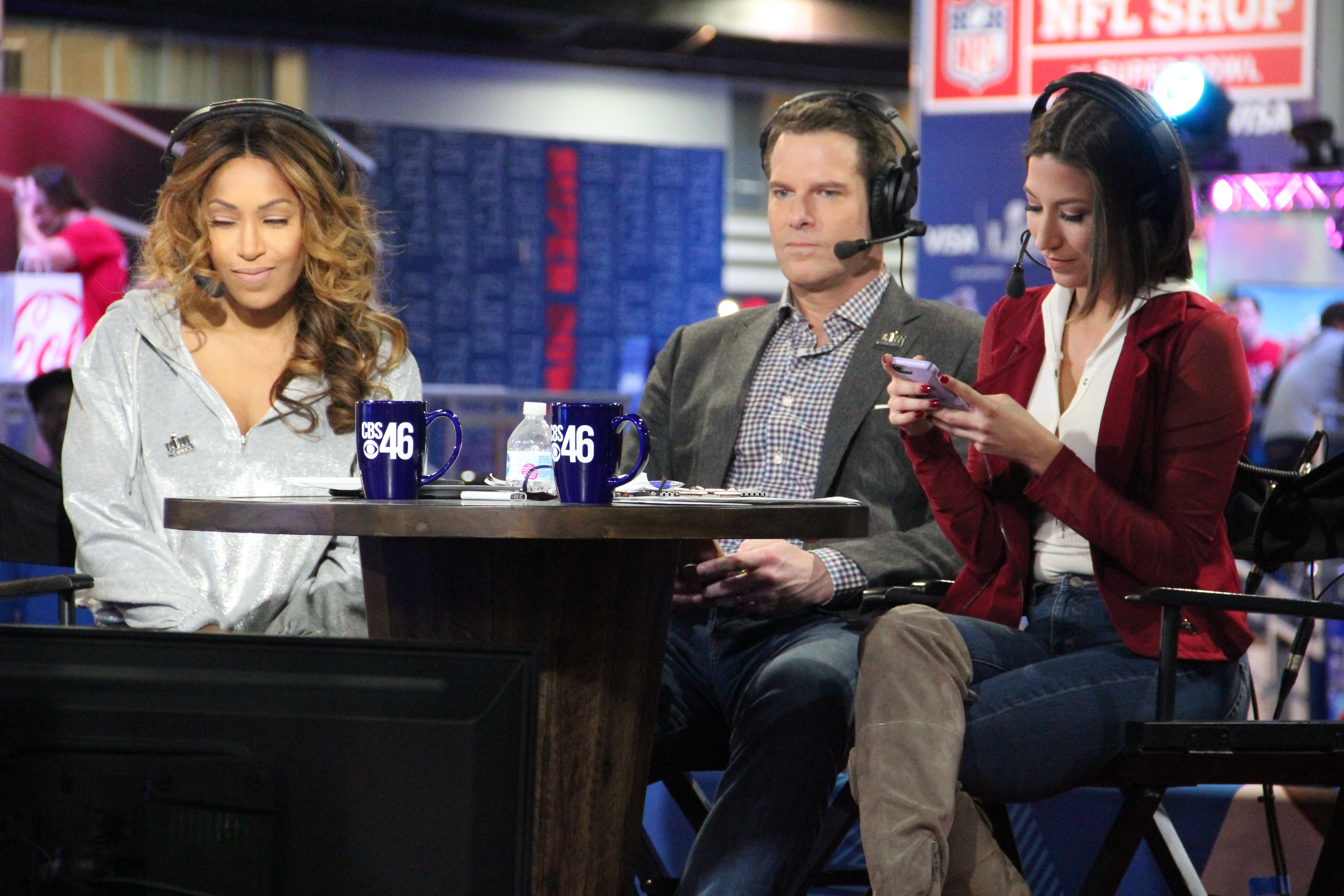
WGCL-TV anchors at the Super Bowl Experience prior to Super Bowl LIII in Atlanta

=== Launch ===
Even after Tribune—with its independent news operations in Chicago, New York, and Denver—acquired channel 46, launching a news department was not immediately on the station's radar due to its expense. However, ratings began to rise, and after must-carry rules for TV stations on cable systems were removed in 1987, management felt that WGNX needed to differentiate itself from cable channels to retain carriage. At one meeting, Tribune Broadcasting president Jim Dowdle asked general manager Ramsey while standing in the station parking lot, "Don't get excited, not now, but if we were to put a newsroom in that building, where would it go?" After research showed enthusiasm for a possible newscast, the station prepared a cost-analysis to present to Tribune.

In July 1988, Tribune approved WGNX to start a 30-minute local newscast to air at 10 p.m. seven days a week. After an investment of several million dollars, Georgia's News at Ten began broadcasting on January 15, 1989; prior to its launch, Atlanta had been the largest market in the United States without an independent prime time newscast. The newscast, which focused on longer reports, won awards from journalists' organizations and increased its ratings; in June 1990, it expanded to an hour when USA Tonight, a nationally syndicated news program produced by Tribune, was discontinued.

=== Changes with CBS and Clear News ===
When WGNX became a CBS affiliate, the 10 p.m. newscast moved to 11 p.m., and a briefly aired 7:30 p.m. newscast was dropped. Over the course of the next several years, the station slowly expanded its news output, with noon and 7 p.m. local newscasts in 1995; the latter moved to 6 p.m. in 1996.

In 1997, one series of billboards for the station featured news anchors Karyn Greer and John McKnight next to the words "NAME 'EM", daring viewers to take an interest in the relative unknowns on channel 46; the station's newscasts were being outrated by other stations' presentations of syndicated programs including The Fresh Prince of Bel-Air, Family Matters, and M*A*S*H. By 1999, when Meredith took over, the 6 p.m. local news ranked seventh out of all seven major commercial stations in Atlanta in that time slot, and Allen Shaklan, the new general manager, noted that his station existed "below people's horizon of visibility". The station was producing just 90 minutes of news a day in three half-hour newscasts.

In 2000, as part of the image overhaul, with the new WGCL-TV call sign came a new moniker, Clear News, and a format focused on more substantive stories with fewer murders, fires, and accidents. The station also began airing a two-hour morning newscast and a 5 p.m. news hour as it was able to expand ahead of its move to Midtown. With the move, the station adopted a new green and gold set and theme music that was an orchestration of I Can See Clearly Now. However, Clear News was dismantled after the 2002 resignation of Allen Shaklan, and Sue Schwartz rebranded the station as "CBS 46, Atlanta's News Channel", with some limited initial success.

By 2005, the station had canceled its 5 p.m. newscast to focus on the less crowded 4 p.m. market and cut back its morning news presence to bolster its evening newscasts, which had the benefit of lead-ins from CBS prime time ratings. It then returned a 5 p.m. newscast in 2010, by which time it had expanded its morning newscast to 2 1/2 hours.

The station usually came in fourth place in Atlanta's news ratings behind WSB, WAGA and WXIA. Shortly before Gray closed on its purchase of WGCL-TV, Rodney Ho of The Atlanta Journal-Constitution described the station as "a bit of a revolving door news operation", noting that it was about to have its ninth news director since 2007.

=== Gray news expansions ===
After purchasing WGCL-TV–WPCH, Gray announced expansions in the news staff and offerings of the WGCL-TV newsroom, which was staffed by 50 to 60 people at the time Meredith sold it. In March 2022, Gray declared its intent to add 40 more news employees as well as 9 a.m. and 3 p.m. local newscasts; the staffing expansion ultimately materialized as an increase of 50. Two months later, WGCL-TV added a 7 p.m. newscast and began producing a 7–9 a.m. morning newscast for air on WPCH-TV, bringing the total weekday news output across the two stations to 11 hours a day. According to Schrader, Gray intended for channel 46 to be a "community-focused local news service" that emphasized breaking news, investigative journalism, and weather coverage. Both station and corporate executives said these moves were natural given Gray's longstanding emphasis on local news; news director Kim Saxon pointed out that Gray CEO Hilton Howell regularly watched channel 46's newscasts. The changes culminated in the implementation of the new Atlanta News First brand. A two-hour prime time news block also aired at 9 p.m. on WPCH-TV.

In its first spring sweeps as Atlanta News First, WANF finished fourth at 6 p.m. with only 34,000 viewers, barely half the viewership commanded by market-leading WSB-TV but within 4,000 viewers of third-place WXIA. Its 11 p.m. newscast was a distant fourth with 6,400 viewers, not even half of third-place WXIA's total. With the disaffiliation from CBS, by December 2025, the station's news output was 14 1/2 hours a day on weekdays and 4 1/2 hours a day on weekends for a total of 81 1/2 hours.

=== Notable on-air staff ===
==== Current ====
- Rick Folbaum – anchor
- Monica Kaufman Pearson – host

==== Former ====
- Amanda Davis – anchor (2015–2017)
- Shon Gables – anchor (2018–2025)
- Tony Harris – anchor (2003–2004)
- Dagmar Midcap – weather anchor/reporter (2007–2010)
- Thomas Roberts – anchor (2018–2020)
- Jane Robelot – anchor (1999–2003)
- Brandon Rudat – anchor (2010–2013)
- Ben Swann – anchor and reporter (2015–2018)

== Technical information ==
=== Subchannels ===
WANF broadcasts from a tower in northeastern Atlanta, near North Druid Hills. Its signal is multiplexed:

Subchannels of WANF
Subchannel	Res.	Short name	Programming
46.1	1080i	WANF-TV	Main WANF programming
46.2	480i	COZI	Cozi TV
46.3	480i	Grit	Grit
47.1	480i	WKTB	Telemundo (WKTB-CD)
17.1	1080i	WPCH-TV	The CW (WPCH-TV)
17.4	480i	WPCH-SD	Peachtree TV Canadian feed

Simulcast of subchannels of another station
Broadcast on behalf of another station

Cozi TV and Grit were added as subchannels in 2015.

WPCH-TV is Atlanta's ATSC 3.0 (NextGen TV) station, transmitting its own ATSC 3.0 signal as well as those of WSB, WAGA, WXIA and WANF. WANF in turn transmits WPCH's primary subchannel.

=== Analog-to-digital conversion ===
As WGCL-TV, this station ended regular programming over UHF channel 46 on June 12, 2009, as part of the federally mandated transition from analog to digital television; it retained its digital signal on UHF channel 19, using virtual channel 46. The analog signal continued to operate for another two weeks, until June 26, to broadcast information regarding the transition to digital television under the SAFER Act.
