= Brandon Lee Rudat =

American journalist

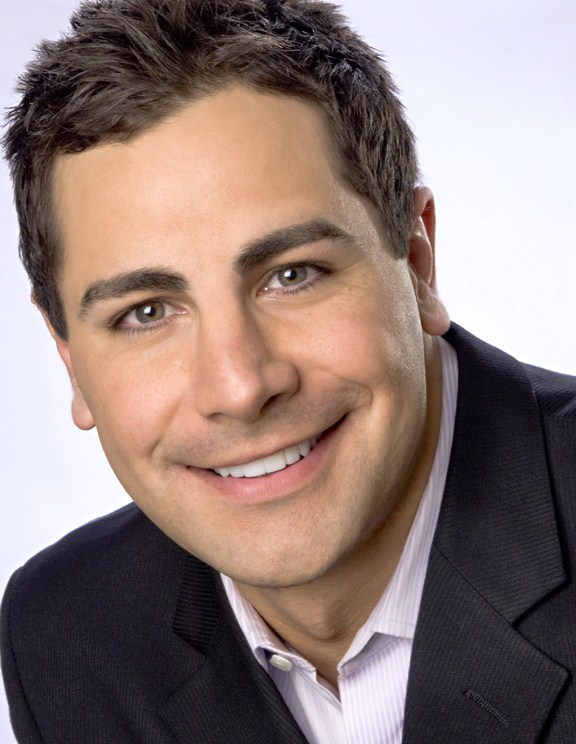
- Born: May 29, 1980 (age 46)
- Occupation: Journalist
- Years active: 2001–present

Brandon Lee Rudat (born May 29, 1980) is an American journalist and television anchor.

== Professional career ==
Rudat started his professional career as an intern on the Today Show in New York City and a producer for WNBC's Today in New York where he covered the 9/11 terrorist attacks and aftermath. Rudat then relocated to Maryland where he worked as the morning anchor and reporter for WHAG-TV, NBC 25. Rudat has also worked as a political reporter for a cable news network in New York and a fill-in anchor at WVIT based out of Hartford, Connecticut, notably for his investigative reporting of illegal street vendors and manufacturers of illegal fire extinguishers. Rudat worked at WHDH-TV in Boston until April 2009 and subsequently went to KTLA in Los Angeles from June 2009 until April 2010.

From May 2010 to July 2013, Rudat was employed by WGCL-TV, the CBS affiliate in Atlanta, as the anchor of CBS Atlanta's morning show, Better Mornings Atlanta. He also did a cameo as a news anchor in the 2011 film Green Hornet.

On January 29, 2014, he joined KTVK in Phoenix as an anchor of the show Good Evening Arizona. In Phoenix he's known as Brandon Lee.

He co-anchored the 6:30 p.m.and 10:00 p.m. news broadcasts on Phoenix-based Arizona Family channels KTVK (3TV) and KPHO (CBS5), with Yetta Gibson.

== Awards ==
In May 2007, Rudat won an Emmy for an exclusive story he did about a fire chief who was also a convicted child sex offender. He was also nominated for eight other Emmy Awards including Best Investigative Reporting and for his work at the 2006 Winter Olympic Games in Torino, Italy.

Rudat is a graduate of New York University and is the recipient of an Associated Press award for Best Enterprise Reporting.
