= WGTA (TV) =

Television station in Toccoa, Georgia, United States

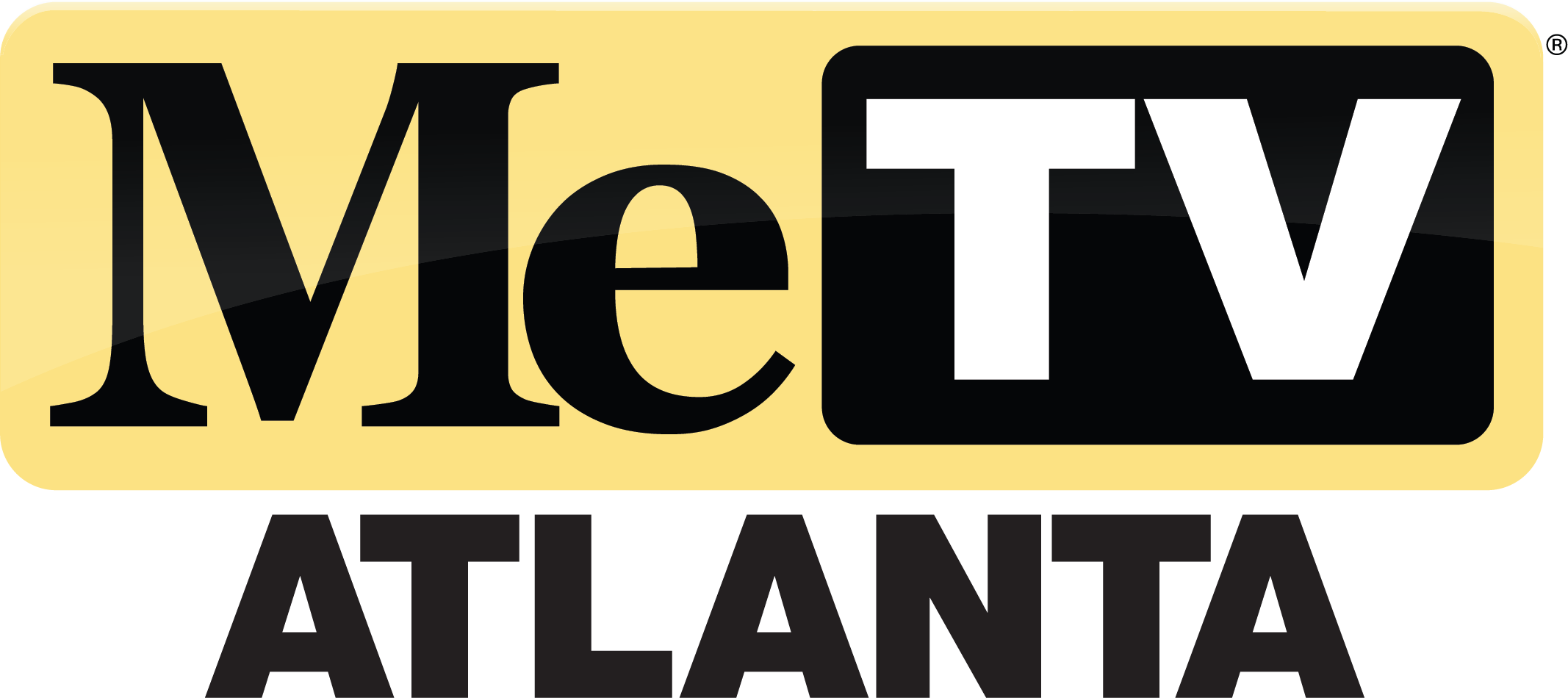
- Toccoa, Georgia; United States
- Channels: Digital: 24 (UHF); Virtual: 32
- Branding: WGTA, MeTV Atlanta

Programming
- Affiliations: 32.1: MeTV; for others, see § Subchannels

Ownership
- Owner: Marquee Broadcasting; (Marquee Broadcasting Georgia, Inc.)

History
- First air date: September 9, 1984
- Former call signs: WNEG-TV (1984–2011); WUGA-TV (2011–2015)
- Former channel numbers: Analog: 32 (UHF, 1984–2009)
- Former affiliations: Independent (1984–1995); CBS (1995–2008); This TV (2008–2010); America One (2008–2011); World (via GPB Knowledge, 2011–2015); Heroes & Icons (2015–2017)
- Call sign meaning: Greenville to Atlanta

Technical information
- Licensing authority: FCC
- Facility ID: 63329
- ERP: 240 kW
- HAAT: 235.1 m (771 ft)
- Transmitter coordinates: 34°36′35.7″N 83°22′14.3″W
- Translator(s): WUPA 69.4 Atlanta

Links
- Public license information: Public file; LMS
- Website: www.wgtatv.com

WGTA (channel 32) is a television station licensed to Toccoa, Georgia, United States, serving much of the northeastern portion of the state. The station is owned by Marquee Broadcasting and has studios on Big A Road in Toccoa; its transmitter is located northwest of Black Rock Mountain outside of Toccoa in unincorporated Stephens County.

WGTA broadcasts programming from the MeTV, Heroes & Icons, Catchy Comedy, Movies! and Story Television multicast services (all owned and operated by Weigel Broadcasting). It primarily serves four counties in northeast Georgia that are part of the Greenville–Spartanburg–Asheville market. The station provides at least secondary coverage to the extreme east-northeastern portions of the Atlanta market, including Athens, Gainesville and Braselton. Four of the five networks (Movies!, Catchy Comedy, MeTV, and Heroes & Icons) are simulcast on the second and fifth digital subchannels of WAGA-TV (5.2 and 5.5) and the fourth and seventh subchannels of WUPA (69.4 and 69.7) in the Atlanta area.

== History ==
The station first signed on the air on September 9, 1984, as WNEG-TV (the call letters representing Northeast Georgia); operating as a commercial independent station at the time, the station was originally owned by Toccoa businessman Roy Gaines and his Stephens County Broadcasting Company along with longtime local radio station WNEG (630 AM). Gaines felt that northeast Georgia received very little local news coverage from stations in the adjacent Atlanta, Augusta, and Greenville/Spartanburg/Asheville markets, and launched WNEG in order to fill this void. However, the station struggled to make money, as there were barely enough viewers or advertisers in its primarily rural area for it to be viable. Virtually the only program that generated ratings on the station was the popular Billy Dilworth Show; it and WNEG radio's ratings were all that kept channel 32 afloat. Gaines campaigned tirelessly to have WNEG added to area cable systems, often buying antennas and offering technical assistance in exchange for adding WNEG to their channel line-ups.

Gaines ultimately gave up on trying to make the station viable in 1990, and decided to put channel 32 up for sale. However, he was unable to find any buyers until August 1995, when it entered into a time brokerage agreement with Spartan Communications, making WNEG a sister station to Spartan's television flagship, WSPA-TV (channel 7) in Spartanburg. Spartan bought the station outright two years later (WNEG radio still exists, but operates separately from and maintains different ownership than the former WNEG-TV).

Through the deal with Spartan, WNEG was able to gain an affiliation with CBS, restoring that network to areas of northeast Georgia that had lost access to CBS programming one year earlier, when longtime Atlanta affiliate WAGA-TV switched to Fox as a result of then-owner New World Communications' groupwide affiliation agreement with Fox. The new Atlanta CBS affiliate, WGNX (channel 46, now WANF), was located on UHF, and did not have nearly the signal coverage that WAGA had in northeast Georgia. Many areas of northeast Georgia were among the few areas where cable still did not have much penetration. Spartan also beefed up WNEG's news department, and changed the station's (and by extension, its newscasts) branding to NewsChannel 32, using a logo similar to the one that WSPA used from 1994 to 2001 (which was also used by another sister station, WJBF in Augusta, around the same time period). WNEG and the rest of Spartan's properties were acquired by Media General in 2000. When WSPA and WJBF (along with the company's other stations) switched to Media General's standardized logo design, WNEG retained its Spartan-era logo.

On October 29, 2007, Media General announced that it was exploring the sale of WNEG and four other stations due to the company's severe debt crisis. This was followed on June 25, 2008, with an announcement that the station would be sold to the University of Georgia Research Foundation, with plans to use channel 32 as a training facility for students in the university's Henry W. Grady College of Journalism and Mass Communication. The university took control on October 15; at that time, CBS programming was dropped and replaced with programming from the America One and This TV networks. UGA moved the operations of WNEG-TV from its studios in Toccoa to the university campus in Athens in the fall of 2009, and also added more locally produced programming. As a result of WNEG dropping CBS, the network's default affiliates became WSPA for northeast Georgia until August 2026 when the network moved to the third subchannel of NBC affiliate WYFF (channel 4) and WGCL-TV (the former WGNX) for the Atlanta market until August 2025 when CBS converted WUPA (channel 69) into an owned-and-operated station.

Among the syndicated programs acquired by the station after the University of Georgia took over operations included reruns of Degrassi: The Next Generation and Family Feud (the latter of which had aired on MyNetworkTV affiliate WMYA-TV (channel 40, now a Roar affiliate) for seven years at the time of its move).

WUGA-TV logo as an Educational independent.

On December 23, 2010, UGA announced it would enter into a programming partnership with the Georgia Public Telecommunications Commission, which would provide programming from Georgia Public Broadcasting (GPB) to WNEG, with most of the content coming from its GPB Knowledge subchannel. The university subsequently filed an application to the Federal Communications Commission (FCC) to convert the station's license to non-commercial status; UGA cited a reduction of advertising revenue, resulting from the economic downturn and the loss of the station's CBS affiliation. The station also announced its intention to change its call letters to WUGA-TV. On January 6, 2011, WNEG announced that it would undergo a staff reorganization, with twelve permanent staff members and five temporary staffers being laid off in the restructuring; the station also eliminated its news operation, with a student-produced newscast, UGA Newssource, replacing it on January 31 (in the interim, the only news programming on WNEG was an America One-provided national newscast produced by Independent News Network). In addition, WNEG's This TV affiliation ended on January 1, 2011, with the movie-focused network moving to a subchannel of WYFF. WUGA-TV was operated in conjunction with WUGA radio (91.7 FM), whose license is owned by the Georgia Public Telecommunications Commission, but is operated by the University of Georgia.

At 5:30 a.m. on May 1, 2011, the station began broadcasting programming from World through GPB's "GPB Knowledge" network. The station's call letters were officially changed to WUGA-TV the following day on May 2.

On March 25, 2015, the University of Georgia agreed to sell WUGA-TV to Marquee Broadcasting, owner of WMDT in Salisbury, Maryland, for $2.5 million. Under the terms of the deal, Marquee returned channel 32 to commercial operation and changed the station's call letters to WGTA (in reference to its "Greenville to Atlanta" coverage area). UGA had considered selling the station as early as November 2013, and on March 27, 2014, announced that it would eliminate WUGA-TV's local programming (which comprised only one percent of channel 32's schedule) effective July 1; this resulted in six staffers being laid off. At the time of the cutback, the university stated that it was not actively attempting to sell the station. The change to WGTA took place on July 1, 2015, when the sale to Marquee was completed; at the same time, the station dropped all GPB Knowledge and World programming and began broadcasting Heroes & Icons on 32.1, Decades on 32.2, and Movies! on 32.3. Marquee also moved WGTA's studios back to Toccoa.

Effective March 25, 2017, WGTA's primary channel became the Atlanta affiliate for the MeTV network, replacing WSB-TV, with Heroes & Icons moving to the station's second subchannel, Decades to third subchannel and Movies! to a new fourth subchannel.

== News operation ==
=== Notable former on-air staff ===
- Matt McClure – anchor, NewsChannel 32 Daybreak

== Technical information ==
=== Subchannels ===
The station's signal is multiplexed:

Subchannels of WGTA
Subchannel	Res.	Short name	Programming
32.1	480i	Me-TV	MeTV
32.2	480i	H&I	Heroes & Icons
32.3	480i	Decades	Catchy Comedy
32.4	480i	Movies!	Movies!
32.5	480i	Story	Story Television

=== Analog-to-digital conversion ===
WGTA (as WNEG-TV) shut down its analog signal, over UHF channel 32, on February 17, 2009, to conclude the federally mandated transition from analog to digital television. The station's digital signal remained on its pre-transition UHF channel 24, using virtual channel 32.

== Cable and satellite coverage ==
Although the station is licensed to a city within the Greenville–Spartanburg–Asheville market, WUGA-TV's satellite coverage in that market was limited to Dish Network. On cable, the station was only available outside of Georgia on Northland Communications' systems in Pickens and Oconee counties in South Carolina.

In October 2012, DirecTV, Dish Network and AT&T U-verse began to carry WUGA-TV on channel 32 within the Atlanta market. WUGA-TV was later added to Comcast systems on channel 96 in Barrow, Jackson, Hall and northern Gwinnett counties.

Following the sale to Marquee Broadcasting and relaunch as WGTA, the station temporarily lost nearly all of its cable and satellite coverage. Marquee entered negotiations with TV service providers in the station's coverage area. Initially, it was only able to sign deals with TruVista in northeast Georgia and Northland Communications in South Carolina. At the start of 2016, it was restored to AT&T U-Verse's Atlanta system. Later in 2016, it was able to reach an agreement with Comcast Xfinity, the largest cable provider in the Atlanta area.

== See also ==
- WSPA-TV – WNEG-TV's former sister station
