= Rick Folbaum =

American news anchor

- Born: Eric Folbaum; August 5, 1969 (age 57)
- Education: Syracuse University (B.S.)
- Occupations: Television news anchor and Television journalist
- Years active: 1996–present
- Employer: Gray Media
- Television: WANF (2019–present)
- Children: 5

Rick Folbaum (born August 5, 1969) is an American broadcast journalist. Since September 2019, he has been a news anchor at Atlanta's WANF (channel 46). Most recently, he was a freelancer at CNN International and was also an original news anchor and correspondent for the Fox News Channel.

== Early life and education ==
Folbaum grew up in Cherry Hill, New Jersey, and graduated in 1987 from Cherry Hill High School West.

He graduated from Syracuse University's S. I. Newhouse School of Public Communications with a bachelor's degree in broadcast journalism.

== Career ==
Folbaum began his career as a part of the launch team of MSNBC as a writer and also worked in radio at WOR-AM in New York City.

Known for his years at Fox News as an anchor of Fox News Live, the Fox Report Saturdays, and as a substitute anchor for Shepard Smith's programs, Folbaum joined in 1996 as one of the original anchors and correspondents, and was the network's London-based correspondent from 1998 to 2000, covering news stories across Europe and the Middle East.

Folbaum was co-anchor for the FOX flagship station in New York City, WNYW, for Fox 5 News at 6. He joined in early 2006. In 2009, he returned to Fox News as a weekday substitute anchor and regularly hosted the Saturday 6:00 p.m. edition of America's News Headquarters.

In August 2013, Folbaum joined WFOR, the CBS station in Miami, as an evening anchor. He anchored at WFOR until 2018.

Since November 2018, he worked as a freelance anchor for CNN International. In September 2019, Folbaum was named the evening anchor of WGCL, the CBS affiliate in Atlanta.

Aside from his anchoring duties, he was also a recurrent guest-panelist on Fox's late-night satire show Red Eye w/Greg Gutfeld prior to its cancellation.

== Personal life ==
Rick is the father of five children: Dylan, Summer, Chase, Harlowe, and Cash.

In March 2020, Folbaum was diagnosed with and recovered from coronavirus.
