= WKTB-CD =

Television station in Norcross, Georgia, United States

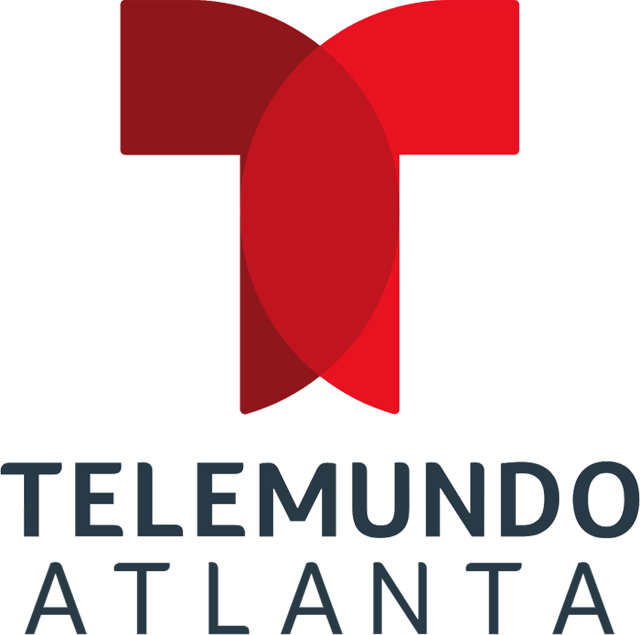
- Norcross–Atlanta, Georgia; United States
- City: Norcross, Georgia
- Channels: Digital: 23 (UHF); Virtual: 47
- Branding: Telemundo Atlanta

Programming
- Affiliations: 47.2: Telemundo; for others, see § Subchannels

Ownership
- Owner: Gray Media; (Gray Television Licensee, LLC)
- Sister stations: WANF, WPCH-TV

History
- Founded: April 2, 1990
- First air date: March 7, 1991
- Former call signs: W67CI (1990–2000); W38CU (2000–2009); WKTB-CA (2009–2011)
- Former channel numbers: Analog: 67 (UHF, 1991–2000), 38 (UHF, 2000–2011); Digital: 47 (UHF, 2011–2019)
- Call sign meaning: Korean American TV Broadcasting (former owner)

Technical information
- Licensing authority: FCC
- Facility ID: 35418
- Class: CD
- ERP: 15 kW
- HAAT: 147.1 m (483 ft)
- Transmitter coordinates: 33°55′1.3″N 84°12′5.9″W
- Translator(s): WANF 47.1 (SD full-market simulcast); W20EQ-D Athens; W33EU-D Athens; W24FJ-D Rome

Links
- Public license information: Public file; LMS
- Website: www.telemundoatlanta.com

WKTB-CD (channel 47) is a low-power, Class A television station licensed to Norcross, Georgia, United States, serving the Atlanta area as an affiliate of the Spanish-language network Telemundo. It is owned by locally based Gray Media alongside independent station and company flagship WANF (channel 46), and CW affiliate WPCH-TV (channel 17). WKTB-CD's studios are located on Green River Parkway in Duluth, and its transmitter is located on Goshen Springs Road (near the I-85/SR 140 interchange) just outside Norcross. Master control and most internal operations are based at the shared studios of WANF and WPCH-TV on 14th Street Northwest in Atlanta's Home Park neighborhood.

The 47.2 signal is rebroadcast in widescreen standard definition on full-power WANF to provide a Telemundo signal to the entire market, using virtual channel 47.1.

== History ==
=== Early years ===
On April 2, 1990, John R. Broomall received the construction permit for a new low-power television station licensed to Roswell, Georgia, on channel 67. Broomall sold the permit to the Korean American TV Broadcasting Co. in April 1991.

By 1996, Korean American had added Telemundo programming, which aired for most of the day, alongside Chinese- and Korean-language fare. Korean programming aired from 7 a.m. to 10 a.m. and again from 11 p.m. to 1 a.m., emphasizing local news, alongside local church service broadcasts and South Korean news and entertainment programs.

The Korean programming, known as KTN, went full-time on a cable channel on AT&T Broadband systems in 2001, which increased its output from six hours a day. Programming continued to include imported and local productions. Meanwhile, channel 67 became channel 38, a result of the clearing of channels 60 to 69 for telecommunications use, in 2000, becoming W38CU. The station's coverage area did not reach much of the city of Atlanta, but it did reach areas of Gwinnett County and DeKalb County with significant ethnic populations.

Former WKTB logo

=== Digital era ===
Korean American TV obtained a permit to construct W47DN-D as its digital companion channel on channel 47, with a superior technical facility covering much of the metropolitan area. In 2009, W38CU obtained Class A status and became WKTB-CA; this transferred to the digital transmitter in 2011 upon consolidation under one license. In 2009, the station reaffiliated with Telemundo. In August 2013, a subchannel on full-power WPXA-TV began repeating WKTB-CD's Telemundo feed in standard definition, using virtual channel 47.11. In June 2021, this moved to WSB-TV.

=== Sale to Gray Television ===
On February 7, 2022, it was announced that Gray Television would purchase WKTB-CD and sister company Surge Digital Media, an ad agency specializing in multicultural clients and services, for $30 million, pending approval by the Federal Communications Commission (FCC); this would make WKTB-CD a sister station to Gray's duopoly of WGCL-TV (channel 46, now WANF) and independent WPCH-TV (channel 17). The sale was completed on April 1, and with it, its full-power simulcast moved to WGCL's spectrum, remaining mapped to 47.1.

== Newscasts ==
In 2012, Telemundo Atlanta began offering a full local news service with newscasts at 6 and 11 p.m.; the station had previously produced three daily 90-second news briefs prior to the expansion. A 5:30 p.m. newscast was added in 2015. Telemundo Atlanta's newscasts were originally helmed by anchor Jorge Buzo. On February 19, 2024, Telemundo Atlanta launched a midday newscast, airing weekdays at noon.

== Subchannels ==
The station's signal is multiplexed:

Subchannels of WKTB-CD
Subchannel	Res.	Short name	Programming
47.2	1080i	TMDO	Telemundo
47.3	480i	TeleX	TeleXitos
47.4	480i	KBS	KBS America
47.5	480i	WKTB365	365BLK
47.6	480i	WKTBOUT	Outlaw
47.7	480i	TOONS	MeTV Toons
47.8	480i	DEFY	Defy

The WKTB-CD feed on the WANF multiplex uses channel 47.1.
