= WAGA-TV =

Television station in Atlanta

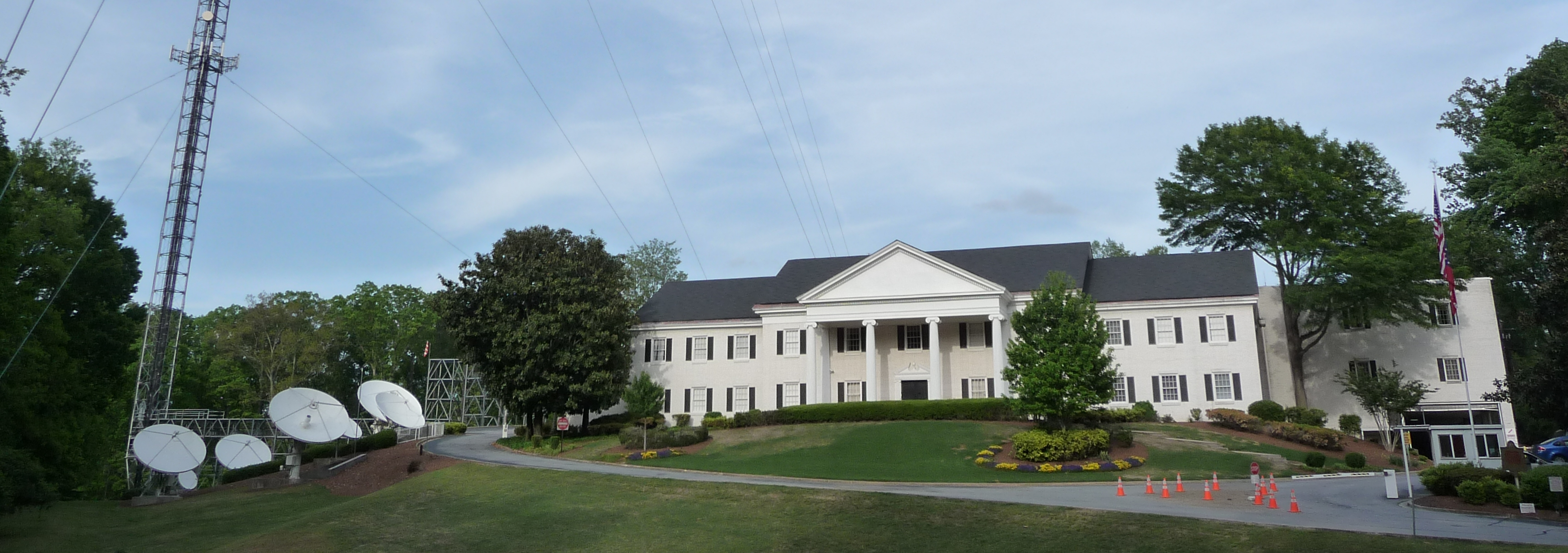
- WAGA-TV studios
- Atlanta, Georgia; United States
- Channels: Digital: 27 (UHF); Virtual: 5
- Branding: Fox 5 Atlanta; Fox 5 News

Programming
- Affiliations: 5.1: Fox; for others, see § Subchannels

Ownership
- Owner: Fox Television Stations; (New World Communications of Atlanta, Inc.)

History
- First air date: March 8, 1949
- Former call signs: WAGA (1998–2009)
- Former channel number: Analog: 5 (VHF, 1949–2009)
- Former affiliations: CBS (1949–1994); DuMont (secondary, 1949–1956); NTA (secondary, 1956–1961); United (secondary, 1967)
- Call sign meaning: Atlanta, Georgia; derived from WAGA radio

Technical information
- Licensing authority: FCC
- Facility ID: 70689
- ERP: 1,000 kW
- HAAT: 332 m (1,089 ft)
- Transmitter coordinates: 33°47′51.4″N 84°20′1.7″W
- Repeaters: WHTA-HD2, Hampton (HD Radio simulcast of FoxLocal stream)

Links
- Public license information: Public file; LMS
- Website: www.fox5atlanta.com

WAGA-TV (channel 5) is a television station in Atlanta, Georgia, United States, serving as the market's Fox network outlet. Owned and operated by the network's Fox Television Stations division, the station maintains studios and transmitter facilities on Briarcliff Road Northeast in the Druid Hills area of unincorporated DeKalb County, just outside the Atlanta city limits.

== History ==
=== As a CBS affiliate ===
WAGA-TV first began operations on March 8, 1949. The station was originally owned by the Toledo, Ohio–based Fort Industry Company, which also operated WAGA radio (AM 590, now WDWD; and WAGA-FM 103.3, now WVEE), all colloquially called "Wagga". Fort Industry would later be renamed Storer Broadcasting after the company's founder, George B. Storer. Channel 5 is Atlanta's second-oldest television station, signing on seven months after WSB-TV (then on channel 8). Originally a CBS affiliate, owing to its radio sister's longtime affiliation with the CBS Radio Network, channel 5 also carried a secondary affiliation with the DuMont Television Network from 1949 to 1956. During the late 1950s, the station was also briefly affiliated with the NTA Film Network. Storer sold the WAGA radio stations in 1959; however, channel 5 has, except from 1998 to 2009, retained the "-TV" suffix.

WAGA-TV was the only VHF commercial station in Atlanta that was on the same channel from its launch. Though both WSB-TV and WLTV—predecessor of WXIA-TV (channel 11)—initially broadcast over channel 8, the Federal Communications Commission's 1952 Sixth Report and Order reallocated the frequency to Athens and reserved the channel for non-commercial educational use. The University of Georgia returned channel 8 to the air as WGTV, now the television flagship of Georgia Public Broadcasting, in May 1960.

WAGA-TV originally broadcast from studios and transmission facilities located at 1018 West Peachtree Street Northwest. This building would later become home to pioneering superstation and leading Atlanta independent station WTBS (channel 17, now WPCH-TV). On June 21, 1966, channel 5 opened its current facilities in Druid Hills. Branded by the station as "The Television Center of the South", the building resembles an antebellum Southern mansion–a type of Colonial Revival architecture that was typical for Storer's broadcasting facilities. While this design was somewhat out of place in most of Storer's other markets (which also included Toledo, Detroit, Cleveland and Milwaukee), it was a perfect fit for Atlanta. (The studio facility was used for an on-location shoot for a Matlock episode called "The Reporter".)

WAGA's original transmitter tower was later the site of a different tower for WPCH-TV's analog channel 17 signal, and a backup for WWWQ (99.7 FM). Because Storer Cable became part of Comcast, the tower (owned by competing cable television provider Time Warner, along with WPCH) was to be removed by October 2009, ending the land lease.

In 1985, WAGA-TV and the other Storer stations were sold into a group deal to Kohlberg Kravis Roberts & Co. (KKR), a New York-based private equity firm. Two years later in 1987, KKR sold the Storer stations to Gillett Communications. After bankruptcy, Gillett restructured in 1991, selling several stations and changing its name to SCI Television Inc. On June 26, 1991, Gillett Holdings filed for Chapter 11 bankruptcy protection after it failed to reach an agreement with the company's creditors before a court-imposed June 25 deadline. SCI Television also missed repayment of $162 million in bank loans before a June 30 deadline; as a consequence of its financial difficulties, Gillett/SCI decided to sell its broadcast holdings.

On February 17, 1993, one day after SCI purchased WTVT in Tampa from Gillett Holdings in a separate agreement for $163 million, New World Pictures purchased a 51% ownership stake in SCI Television from Gillett for $100 million and $63 million in newly issued debt. The purchase was finalized on May 25, at which point, the film and television production company folded WAGA and its six sister stations—fellow CBS affiliates WTVT, WJW-TV in Cleveland, WJBK-TV in Detroit, and WITI-TV in Milwaukee; NBC affiliate KNSD in San Diego; and then-independent WSBK-TV in Boston—into a new broadcasting subsidiary, New World Communications. As a result of New World being headquartered in Atlanta, WAGA – which was New World's second-largest station, behind WSBK-TV, at the time the SCI purchase was completed – became the company's flagship television station.

=== As a Fox station ===
==== New World Communications ownership ====
On May 23, 1994, as part of a broad deal that also saw News Corporation acquire a 20% equity interest in the company, New World Communications signed a long-term agreement to affiliate its nine CBS-, ABC- or NBC-affiliated television stations with Fox, which sought to strengthen its affiliate portfolio after the National Football League (NFL) accepted the network's $1.58 billion bid for the television rights to the National Football Conference (NFC) – a four-year contract that began with the 1994 NFL season – on December 18, 1993. WAGA-TV was among the stations involved in the Fox agreement, which also initially included four of New World's other existing CBS-affiliated stations – WITI-TV, WJBK-TV, WJW-TV and WTVT – and four additional stations – CBS affiliate KSAZ-TV in Phoenix, ABC affiliates WBRC-TV in Birmingham and WGHP in High Point, North Carolina, and NBC affiliate WDAF-TV in Kansas City, Missouri — that were part of New World's concurrent $360-million acquisition of Great American Communications's television properties. (The agreement would subsequently be amended to include four additional stations that New World acquired later that month from Argyle Television Holdings.) At the time, Fox's owned-and-operated and affiliate stations were mostly UHF outlets that had limited to no prior history as major network affiliates, among them its existing Atlanta outlet, WATL-TV (channel 36, now a MyNetworkTV affiliate), which the network's Fox Television Stations unit had acquired from Renaissance Broadcasting (during its acquisition of then-WATL parent Chase Broadcasting) in 1993. Although the network already owned WATL and was in the midst of planning to launch a local news department for channel 36, Fox found the prospect to having its programming carried on a VHF station too much to resist, considering that WAGA had a stronger market position and a long-respected local news operation. (At the time, channel 5 placed second, behind WSB-TV, in total day and news viewership.) As a result, Fox decided to include WAGA in the affiliation agreement with New World and have Fox Television Stations sell WATL.

With only a few months before WAGA was set to switch to Fox, CBS needed to find a new affiliate in what had become the nation's 10th largest media market. It approached all of Atlanta's major television stations to potentially reach an agreement. However, none of them were interested at first. CBS first approached WXIA-TV; however, its then-owner Gannett Broadcasting subsequently signed a long-term affiliation deal renewing its contract with WXIA and its sister NBC affiliates in Jacksonville, Minneapolis–St. Paul and Phoenix. WSB-TV was later eliminated as an option as its Atlanta-based owner, Cox Enterprises, would reach a new long-term agreement with ABC to retain its affiliation with that network. WATL was eventually eliminated as Qwest Broadcasting (a joint venture between music producer Quincy Jones, former NFL defensive end Willie Davis, television producer Don Cornelius, television host Geraldo Rivera, and Tribune) announced in November that it would purchase WATL from Fox Television Stations as part of a two station, $167-million deal.

By September 1994, with only a little more than two months left before channel 5 was slated to join Fox, CBS faced the prospect of having to pipe in WRBL in Columbus, WMAZ-TV in Macon, WSPA-TV in Spartanburg, South Carolina, and WDEF-TV in Chattanooga, Tennessee, for Atlanta-area cable customers until it found a new affiliate in the market. Almost out of desperation, on September 26, CBS made a deal to buy independent station WVEU (channel 69, now WUPA) for $46 million. However, this was only a contingency, since WVEU's signal at the time barely made it outside of Atlanta itself and its closest-in suburbs, and it barely registered as a blip in the ratings. Even after it agreed to buy WVEU, CBS still sought to move its programming to a higher-profile station. It continued to negotiate with Tribune Broadcasting to reach a deal to affiliate with longtime independent station WGNX (channel 46, now WANF), which initially turned down CBS' offer to affiliate with the station; WGNX was especially attractive for the network since channel 46 was the only non-Big Three station in the Atlanta market that had a functioning news department. That November, Tribune relented and signed a deal with CBS to convert WGNX into the network's new Atlanta affiliate. As a consequence of the WGNX deal, CBS reached an agreement to sell WVEU to Viacom in a three-way deal that saw Viacom sell CBS affiliate KSLA in Shreveport, Louisiana, to Ellis Communications (owned by Atlanta-based businessman Bert Ellis) to comply with FCC ownership rules in coincidence with Viacom's divestitures of its major network-affiliated television stations to focus on its UPN charter outlets. The last CBS network program to air on WAGA was a first-run episode of Walker, Texas Ranger at 10 p.m. Eastern Time on December 10; this led into a message by then-station president and general manager Jack Sander shortly before the start of that evening's edition of Channel 5 Eyewitness News at 11:00 (which was relaunched as an hour-long prime time newscast at 10 p.m. two days later), informing viewers about the pending network changes.

WAGA-TV officially became a Fox affiliate on December 11, 1994, when the network's programming lineup moved to the station from WATL; the first Fox network program to air on the station as a full-time affiliate was Fox NFL Sunday at noon Eastern Time that day, leading into that afternoon's NFL doubleheader: an early game between the Tampa Bay Buccaneers and the Los Angeles Rams and a mid-afternoon game between the San Francisco 49ers and the San Diego Chargers. (The affiliation switch involving WAGA, WGNX and WATL was originally slated to occur on November 27, but was delayed two weeks to allow Fox, New World and CBS to iron out the final details.) Prior to the end of its 45-year affiliation with CBS, WAGA had been the network's longest-tenured affiliate south of Washington, D.C. (a title now held by Charlotte affiliate WBTV, which has carried CBS programming since it signed on the air on July 15, 1949, four months after WAGA); it was also the only station in Atlanta that did not change its primary affiliation. As a result, Atlanta became one of the few TV markets in the United States where all "Big Three" stations changed affiliations, having been affected by an earlier switch in 1980, when WSB became an ABC affiliate, and WXIA switched to NBC. WGNX concurrently took over the CBS affiliation, which necessitated the shift of a large number of the syndicated cartoons, drama series and sitcoms in its inventory over to WVEU – which had become a UPN affiliate when that network launched on January 16, 1995 – as channel 46 could not continue to accommodate many of these shows due to CBS's network-dominated programming lineup; as a result, WGNX became the only Atlanta television station that did not retain its entire existing syndicated programming lineup following the switch. WATL – whose sale to Qwest Broadcasting (which, in 2000, merged with WB network part-owner, the Tribune Company), would not be finalized until December 1995 – temporarily operated as an independent station during its transition into an affiliate of upstart network The WB upon that network's launch the following month on January 11, 1995. (WATL is now owned by Tegna as part of a duopoly with WXIA).

As with most of the other New World-owned stations affected by the affiliation agreement with Fox, WAGA-TV made little mention of the Fox logo and name in its on-air imaging at the outset. Instead, it retained the "Channel 5" branding it had used since 1991 (modified slightly from the "TV5" branding it had used for most of the 1980s). It also retained the Eyewitness News moniker it had used for its newscasts since July 1981. In addition to expanding its local news offerings at the time it joined Fox, the station replaced CBS daytime and late night programs that migrated to WGNX with an expanded slate of syndicated talk shows as well as some off-network sitcoms, game shows and documentary-based reality series, and also acquired some syndicated film packages and first-run and off-network syndicated drama series for broadcast in weekend afternoon timeslots on weeks when Fox did not provide sports programming; however, the revamped programming schedule – as was the case with most of New World's other Fox stations – relegated children's programs to weekend mornings only.

With the switch from WAGA to WGNX, CBS lost significant viewership in the northern portion of the Atlanta market. Despite its five million-watt analog signal, WGNX did not penetrate nearly as far into this area as WAGA did because of the relatively mountainous terrain that is found in that part of northern Georgia. At the time, much of this region was among the few areas in the United States where cable was still not readily available. CBS did not return over-the-air to this area until Toccoa's WNEG-TV (channel 32, now WGTA) joined CBS the following August. Although it was located in the Greenville–Spartanburg–Asheville market, WNEG served as the de facto CBS affiliate for the far northern portion of the Atlanta market as well as the Greenville–Spartanburg–Asheville market's western fringes until that station's sale to the University of Georgia in 2008. (WGNX's availability in this area increased through expanded cable and satellite distribution in subsequent years.) WGNX, which changed its call letters to WANF in 2022, would eventually lose its CBS affiliation on August 16, 2025, with the network moving to WUPA.

==== Fox Television Stations ownership ====
On July 17, 1996, News Corporation—which separated most of its entertainment holdings into 21st Century Fox in July 2013—announced that it would acquire New World in an all-stock transaction worth $2.48 billion. The purchase by News Corporation was finalized on January 22, 1997, folding New World's ten Fox affiliates into the former's Fox Television Stations subsidiary and making all twelve stations affected by the 1994 agreement owned-and-operated stations of the network. (The New World Communications name continues in use as a licensing purpose corporation—as "New World Communications of [state/city], Inc." or "NW Communications of [state/city], Inc."—for WAGA and its sister stations under Fox ownership, extending, from 2009 to 2011, to the former New World stations that Fox sold to Local TV in 2007.)

At that time, Channel 5 became the third English language network-owned commercial station in the Atlanta market (Viacom, then-owner of UPN's Atlanta station WUPA, had acquired part-ownership of that network in 1996). It was also one of two stations that switched to Fox under the New World agreement that replaced an existing Fox O&O, only to later be sold to the network itself (in Dallas–Fort Worth, sister station KDFW-TV had replaced KDAF as that market's Fox station in July 1995), making Atlanta one of a handful of markets more than one station has served as an O&O of the same network. In November 1996, two months before the completion of the Fox–New World merger and at a time when other network-owned stations around the United States began adopting similar network-driven branding, WAGA-TV shortened its branding to simply "Fox 5 Atlanta" per the network's branding guidelines (with its newscasts concurrently rebranding as Fox 5 Eyewitness News, later shortened to Fox 5 News in August 1998).

On December 14, 2017, The Walt Disney Company, owner of WSB-TV's affiliated network ABC, announced its intent to buy WAGA-TV's parent company, 21st Century Fox, for $52.4 billion; the sale excluded the Fox Television Stations unit (including WAGA-TV), the Fox network, Fox News, Fox Sports 1 and the MyNetworkTV programming service, which were transferred to a separate company, Fox Corporation.

== Programming ==
Since it joined the network in December 1994, WAGA has only aired Fox's prime time, Saturday late night and sports programming, as well as special reports produced by Fox News. As with most of its sister stations under its former New World ownership (with the subverted exception of former sister station KTVI in St. Louis, which assumed rights to the network's children's programs in 1996 and carried the blocks until Fox stopped providing them within its schedule), Channel 5 declined carriage of the children's programming blocks that Fox carried prior to 2008, only having aired fall preview specials and network promotions for those blocks that aired within Fox's prime time lineup during that twelve-year period.

WAGA opted not to run the Fox Kids weekday and Saturday blocks when it affiliated with the network, due to the station's interest in airing syndicated shows more compatible with its expanded local news schedule on weekdays, opting only to air children's programs acquired via syndication on weekend mornings (the preemptions of Fox Kids by the New World stations led the network to change its carriage policies to allow Fox stations uninterested in carrying the block the right of first refusal to transfer the local rights to another station; by 2001, affiliates were no longer required to run the Fox Kids lineup even if Fox had not secured a substitute carrier). Fox Kids remained on WATL after it became a WB affiliate in January 1995, before moving to WHOT (channel 34, now WUVG-DT) in September 2000; its successor, FoxBox/4Kids TV, moved to WUPA in January 2002 (coinciding with WHOT's conversion into a Univision O&O), where it aired until the block was cancelled in December 2008. (The paid programming block that replaced it in January 2009, Weekend Marketplace, currently airs on MyNetworkTV affiliate WATL.) On September 13, 2014, WAGA-TV began carrying Xploration Station, a live-action educational program block distributed by Steve Rotfeld Productions that is syndicated primarily to Fox stations (including those owned by Fox Television Stations) on Saturday mornings.

=== Sports programming ===
WAGA began serving as the primary television station for the Atlanta Falcons upon the team's inception in 1966, under CBS's contractual television rights to the pre-AFL merger National Football League. The station carried most regional or national Falcons game telecasts aired by CBS until its contractual rights to the National Football Conference concluded in 1993. However, the station's December 1994 switch to Fox allowed WAGA to retain its status as the Falcons' unofficial "home" station. For the 1994 season, most of the team's first fourteen games that year were aired instead on lame-duck Fox O&O WATL; with that, the 3½-month interruption in game coverage that year, due to the transfer of NFC telecast rights from CBS to Fox, is the only break in network coverage of the team by the station to date since 1966. Since the switch to Fox, both of the Falcons' Super Bowl appearances—XXXIII and LI—have been carried on the station, as both were Super Bowls to which Fox had the national television rights.

Since Fox obtained the partial (now exclusive) over-the-air network television rights to Major League Baseball in 1996, WAGA has also carried certain Atlanta Braves games that have been regionally or nationally televised by the network during the league's regular season and postseason, including their appearance in the 1996 World Series and their victory in the 2021 World Series, which gave the city its first major sports championship since 1995. WTBS/WPCH retained the local over-the-air television rights to the Braves until 2011.

During WAGA's run as a CBS station, it aired select Atlanta Hawks games as part of CBS' NBA coverage from 1973 to 1990, and then the Atlanta Braves from 1990 to 1993 with CBS' MLB broadcast contract (including the team's 1991 and 1992 World Series appearances).

=== News operation ===
WAGA-TV presently broadcasts 78 hours of locally produced newscasts each week (with 13 hours each weekday and 6 1/2 hours each on Saturdays and Sundays). In regards to the number of hours devoted to news programming, it was previously the highest newscast output among Georgia's broadcast television stations, until WANF's news expansions in August 2025.

For most of its first three decades on the air, WAGA-TV was Atlanta's second-highest rated station. From the 1970s to early 2009, it had to fend off a spirited challenge from WXIA-TV, with the two stations regularly trading the number-two position in the market behind longtime leader WSB-TV. However, WXIA has never recovered from a ratings slump in 2009, and WAGA-TV has been the solid runner-up in the market since then.

WAGA's Saturday and Sunday 6 p.m. newscasts are subject to delay due to network sports coverage. WAGA also provided news reports and weather forecasts for news radio station WYAY (106.7 FM), through a partnership between WAGA and WYAY's owner Cumulus Media struck in May 2012.

For many years as a CBS affiliate, the station called its newscasts 5 News Scene. In the 1980s, this changed to Eyewitness News. In 1992, WAGA dropped CBS This Morning through 1994 in favor of a three-hour locally produced morning news program called Good Day Atlanta.

With the 1994 affiliation switch to Fox, WAGA poured more resources into its already well-respected news department. It adopted a news-intensive schedule, increasing its news programming output to nearly 40 hours a week. The station retained a news schedule similar to what it had as a CBS affiliate. However, it expanded the weeknight 6 p.m. newscasts to two hours and moved the 11 p.m. newscast to 10 p.m. and expanded it to a full hour. On January 14, 2008, WAGA debuted a new 11 p.m. newscast called Fox 5 News Edge, returning a newscast to that timeslot since the station was still affiliated with CBS. On March 16, 2009, WAGA became the last major network station in the market (behind WGCL-TV, WSB and WXIA) to begin broadcasting its locally produced newscasts in high-definition.

On September 14, 2009, WAGA expanded its weekday morning newscast to five hours from 5 to 10 a.m. along with the addition of an hour-long 9 a.m. extension of the program called Good Day Xtra. On April 1, 2010, WAGA expanded its morning news by an extra half-hour, with the start time moved a half-hour earlier to 4:30 a.m., becoming the first Atlanta station to expand its morning newscast into that slot; the extension was made to attract those who wake up and go to work earlier than most; the additional half-hour competes against national early morning newscasts airing on WXIA, WGCL and WSB. As of September 2010, WAGA dropped the Fox 5 Morning News and Good Day Xtra titles, in favor of using the Good Day Atlanta branding throughout the morning newscast. On September 14, 2015, the station extended its 11 p.m. newscast to one hour with the addition of a half-hour News Edge at 11:30; this made WAGA among the very few stations to extend its late newscast to midnight, and one of three Fox affiliates (Kansas City's WDAF-TV and Washington, D.C.'s WTTG being the others) to air a two-hour late local news block. On April 15, 2019, WAGA expanded Good Day Atlanta by one hour from 10 a.m. to 11 am. On February 14, 2020, WAGA added a half-hour program titled Road to November on Fridays at 7 p.m. On March 30, 2020, WAGA added an additional half-hour of weekday news from 4:30 p.m to 5 p.m, it later expanded to a full hour on November 16, running evening newscasts from 4 p.m to 7 p.m.

In 2018, $2 Tests: Bad Arrests aired, which then went on to win a Peabody Award, presented at the 2019 awards ceremony.

On February 6, 2025, WAGA-TV and Radio One announced that the second HD Radio channel of WHTA (107.9 FM) would carry the audio of WAGA-TV's online streaming channel FoxLocal Atlanta, including simulcasts and replays of the station's news and sports programming and the talk show Portia.

==== Notable current on-air staff ====
- Alyse Eady
- Ron Gant
- D. J. Shockley

==== Notable former on-air staff ====
- Amanda Davis
- Jeff Hullinger
- Corey McPherrin
- Don Naylor
- Deborah Norville
- Robin Roberts
- Forrest Sawyer
- Chuck Scarborough
- Judy Woodruff

== Technical information ==
=== Subchannels ===
The station's signal is multiplexed:

Subchannels of WAGA-TV
Subchannel	Res.	Short name	Programming
5.1	720p	WAGA-HD	Fox
5.2	480i	MOVIES!	Movies! (WGTA)
5.3	480i	BUZZR	Buzzr
5.4	480i	ROAR	Roar
5.5	480i	CATCHY	Catchy Comedy (WGTA)
5.6	480i	FOX WX	Fox Weather

Simulcast of subchannels of another station

Channel 5.2 originally was for the benefit of smaller cable providers which were taking the fullscreen SD signal straight from the air, and did not want problems due to the widescreen or scan conversion on 5.1; this lasted until the end of April 2009. The channel then stayed blank with no electronic program guide data for several weeks until late June, when it again had identical programming, but this time in widescreen. The 704×480i anamorphic format is unusual, as most standard definition digital channels use a fullscreen 640×480i format (by comparison, widescreen NTSC DVDs use 720×480p). Channel 5.2 again went blank in late July, but continued to have the same program data as 5.1, until it was deleted entirely on December 3.

Fox Television Stations and Radio One announced on February 5, 2025 that the audio of WAGA-TV's local newscasts and other local programming will be now simulcast on the second HD Radio channel of WHTA (107.9) for the benefit of Atlanta metro commuters. Programming replays from the station's Fox Local stream will be played during network and syndicated programming and overnights.

=== Analog-to-digital conversion ===
WAGA shut down its analog signal, over VHF channel 5, on June 12, 2009, as part of the federally mandated transition from analog to digital television. The station's digital signal remained on its pre-transition UHF channel 27, using virtual channel 5. The station's first chief broadcast engineer from 1949, Paul B. Cram, who was aged 99 at the time, was given the duty of permanently turning off the analog transmitter live on the air at 12:30 p.m. on June 12. WSB-TV, WXIA-TV, and WATL also went off the air at the same time, with WSB and WXIA also live in their transmitter rooms like WAGA.

== Out-of-market cable carriage ==
WAGA is carried in parts of Cherokee and Macon counties of western North Carolina, both bordering Georgia. Cherokee is part of the Chattanooga media market of Southeast Tennessee and northwest Georgia, while Macon is part of the Asheville–Greenville–Spartanburg DMA of the western Carolinas and northeast Georgia. Although outside of the must-carry obligations that apply within the Atlanta DMA, both counties are popular with visitors and summer-home residents from the Atlanta area. WSB-TV is also carried in those counties.

In the 1970s and 1980s, WAGA once had cable carriage in Aiken and Clemson in west-central and upstate (northwestern) South Carolina. WAGA also had significant carriage on Storer and Liberty cable systems (later TCI, now Mediacom) in South Georgia during that same timeframe.
