= Don Naylor =

American writer, producer and singer

- Born: Donald Covey Naylor; May 31, 1910; Millwood, Texas, U.S.
- Died: November 5, 1991 (aged 81); Atlanta, Georgia, U.S.
- Occupation: Writer

Donald Covey Naylor (May 31, 1910 – November 5, 1991) was an American writer, producer, singer and radio personality, a radio and television program director and an advertising creative director throughout a fifty-year career in Atlanta, Georgia.

Naylor worked at WGST Radio and later WAGA radio and television in Atlanta. During his career in radio, Naylor created the characters Wee Willie, Madame Bottlestopper, and Uncle Cyrus, characters that he performed himself and included in his shows. From 1960 through 1986, he wrote and produced radio and television advertising for Coca-Cola products (including Coke, Sprite, Tab, and Minute Maid) as Creative Director at McCann Erickson advertising agency, producing many of the famous early television commercials for Coca-Cola that featured movie stars, sports heroes, and popular singers of the day, including Hank Aaron, Joe Torre, Fran Tarkenton, Roger Staubach, Anita Bryant, Dottie West, Howard Duff, Bob Aspromonte, Bob Bruce, Arte Johnson, "Mean" Joe Greene, Lyle Waggoner, Mel Allen, Bear Bryant, Harry Kalas, Kitty Wells, Bart Starr, Bobby Allison, Bobby Knight, Frank Broyles, Shug Jordan, Randy Jones and Dolly Parton. His work at McCann Erickson extended to producing commercials for Coca-Cola bottlers all over the south and occasionally nationwide.

== Early years ==
In his high school years in Texas, Naylor was known for writing poetry and acting in high school plays at Central High School in Fort Worth, Texas. His interest in writing and acting then took him to Hollywood, California, actually riding the rails to get there during the Great Depression years, washing dishes to support himself, and finally being cast in a cavalry movie in which his only scene was riding up on a horse, receiving orders, and saying "Yes Sir!" to the commander, a scene that Naylor mused telling his friends was "cut from the film". About 1934 he returned to Fort Worth, Texas, to work as a script writer at KTAT and KFJZ and became a popular singer on the radio in Fort Worth, Texas with Paul Whiteman's band on the weekly NBC radio show "The Chuck Wagon", for which Naylor also wrote skits for Judy Canova, the comedy star of the show. While in Texas, he also worked in radio with stars including Ginger Rogers, Mary Martin. After his very successful beginnings with his radio writing and performing career in Fort Worth, he was offered a job at WGST in Atlanta in 1936, where he worked on live shows, comedy and quiz shows and a variety of programming until 1950. There, he became a close friend and colleague of the locally well-known Gordon Eaton, who was the main news reader/reporter at WGST in Atlanta. Naylor later became program director of WAGA radio and television in Atlanta from 1951 through 1959.

== Community service ==
Naylor's volunteer service to the community in Atlanta was significant. He enjoyed his volunteer work as an "Old Newsboy" and participated in the Old Newsboys Drive every year, selling papers on the streets of Atlanta on their charitable drive days to raise money for low income children. He was a board member of the Variety Club, which was a professional broadcaster's group. He was a board member of the Camp Fire Girls, and for twenty years he was Chairman of the Board of the Atlanta chapter of the American Lung Association.

== Archival collection ==
A large collection of Naylor’s scripts, recordings, and other career memorabilia are on file in the Popular Music Collection, Special Collections & Archives, at Georgia State University Library in Atlanta.
