= WTOC-FM =

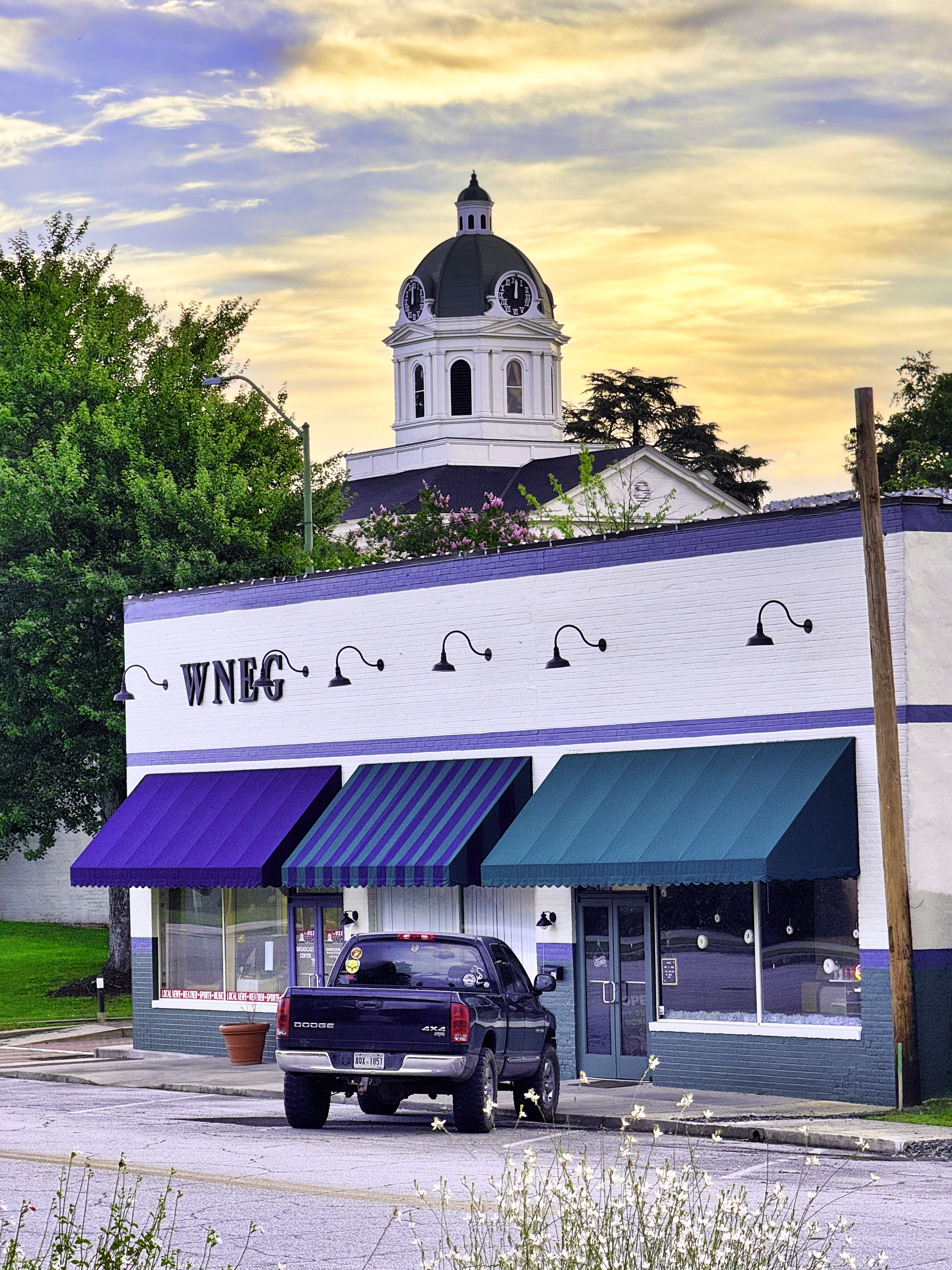
- WNEG with the Stephens County Courthouse behind it.
- Toccoa, Georgia; United States
- Frequency: 95.7 MHz

Programming
- Format: Adult contemporary
- Affiliations: Westwood One

Ownership
- Owner: Georgia-Carolina Radiocasting; (Sutton Radiocasting Corporation)
- Sister stations: WNEG

History
- First air date: 1990 (as WQXJ at 104.1)
- Former call signs: WLFA (1989–1989, CP); WQXJ (1989–1996); WRBN (1996–2025); WNEG-FM (2025)
- Former frequencies: 104.1 MHz (1990–2015); 96.3 MHz (2015–2025)

Technical information
- Licensing authority: FCC
- Facility ID: 56201
- Class: A
- ERP: 370 watts
- HAAT: 395 meters (1,296 ft)
- Transmitter coordinates: 34°54′24.3″N 83°24′55.5″W

Links
- Public license information: Public file; LMS
- Webcast: Listen live
- Website: wnegradio.com

WTOC-FM (95.7 FM) is a radio station broadcasting an adult contemporary music format. Licensed to Toccoa, Georgia, United States, the station is owned by Georgia-Carolina Radiocasting and the broadcast license is held by Sutton Radiocasting Corporation. WTOC-FM features programming from Westwood One.

== History ==
The station was assigned the call letters WLFA on September 29, 1989. On November 29, 1989, the station changed its call sign to WQXJ; on December 9, 1996, it became WRBN. The call sign WRBN was assigned to a small radio station in Warner Robins, Georgia (101.7 FM), from 1965 to 1988. The station was the FM sister station of WGHC (870 AM) until that station moved the Charlotte area in 2008, and of WGHC (1400 AM) from 2009 until that station closed in 2013.

WRBN signed off from Clayton, Georgia, where it operated on 96.3 MHz as adult contemporary station "Sky 96.3", on January 31, 2025, ahead of a planned move to 95.7 MHz in Toccoa. The call sign was changed from WRBN to WNEG-FM on February 10, 2025, and to WTOC-FM on March 26.
