= Truvista Fiber =

American internet provider

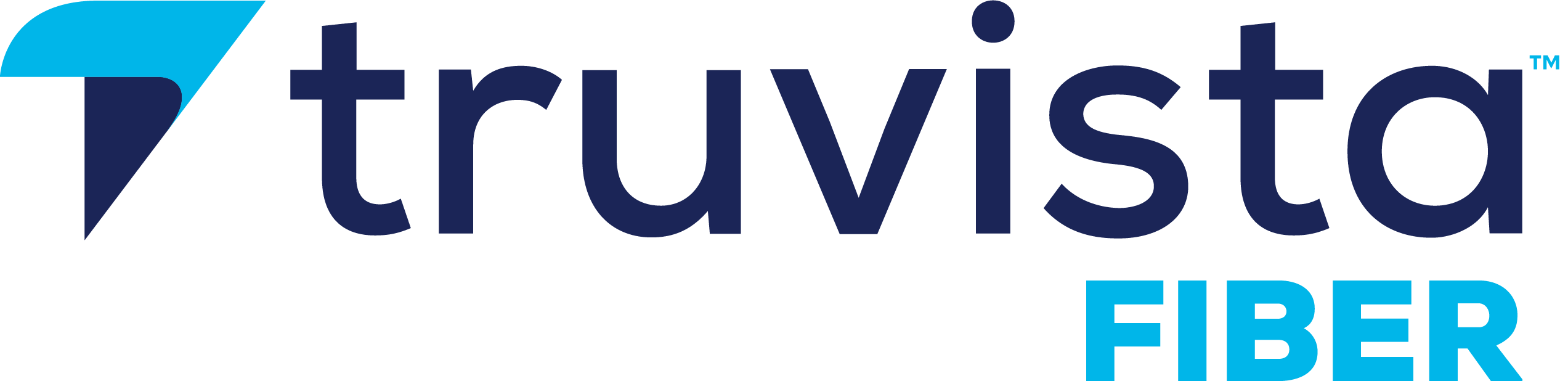
- Industry: Telecommunications
- Founded: 1897
- Headquarters: Chester, SC
- Key people: Carla French, CEO
- Products: Fiber Optic, cable television, broadband, telephone service Security, Wireless
- Number of employees: +/- 300
- Website: https://www.truvista.net/

Truvista Fiber is an American company that provides broadband Internet, long-distance telephone, and cable/IPTV services to customers in the South Carolina counties of Chester County, Fairfield County, Kershaw County and a small portion of Richland County. Truvista Fiber Offers Basic, Standard, and Digital Cable to Customers. In May 2012, Truvista bought cable systems serving Franklin, Hart, Rabun and Stephens counties in Georgia from Northland Communications, a Seattle, WA based company, and Depot Street Communications, a GA based company, the first acquisition outside South Carolina.

== Service areas ==
Truvista Fiber has offices in the following service areas:

- South Carolina: Chester, Camden, Great Falls, Lockhart, Ridgeway, Winnsboro
- Georgia: Commerce, Soperton, Tifton, Toccoa, | Jackson, Stephens, Franklin, Rabun, Hart Counties
