= WGHC (1400 AM) =

Clayton, Georgia; United States
- Frequency: 1400 kHz
- Branding: Rabun County Radio 1400

Programming
- Format: News/talk weekdays and adult standards weeknights and weekends

Ownership
- Owner: Georgia-Carolina Radiocasting; (Tugart Properties, LLC)
- Sister stations: WRBN

History
- First air date: 2009
- Last air date: 2013
- Former call signs: WNGA (2008–2009)

Technical information
- Facility ID: 160276
- Class: C
- Power: 1,000 watts (day); 1,000 watts (night)
- Transmitter coordinates: 34°51′41.3″N 83°24′24.6″W

WGHC (1400 AM, Rabun County Radio 1400) was a radio station licensed to serve Clayton, Georgia, United States. The station was owned by Georgia-Carolina Radiocasting and the broadcast license was held by Tugart Properties, LLC.

WGHC broadcast a full-service news/talk radio format on weekday mornings and afternoons. Weekday evenings and on weekends, WGHC broadcasts an adult standards music format.

== History ==
This station received its original construction permit for a new station broadcasting at 1400 kHz from the Federal Communications Commission on June 18, 2008. The new station was assigned the call sign WNGA by the FCC on July 22, 2008.

After the former WGHC at 1370 kHz moved to North Carolina and became WTCG, this station's call sign was changed to WGHC on May 26, 2009. WGHC received its license to cover from the FCC on June 9, 2009.

Tugart Properties surrendered the station's license to the FCC on April 17, 2014, as the station had been silent for more than a year due to the loss of its transmitter. The license was cancelled and the WGHC call sign deleted from the FCC database on May 1, 2014.
