= WNEG (AM) =

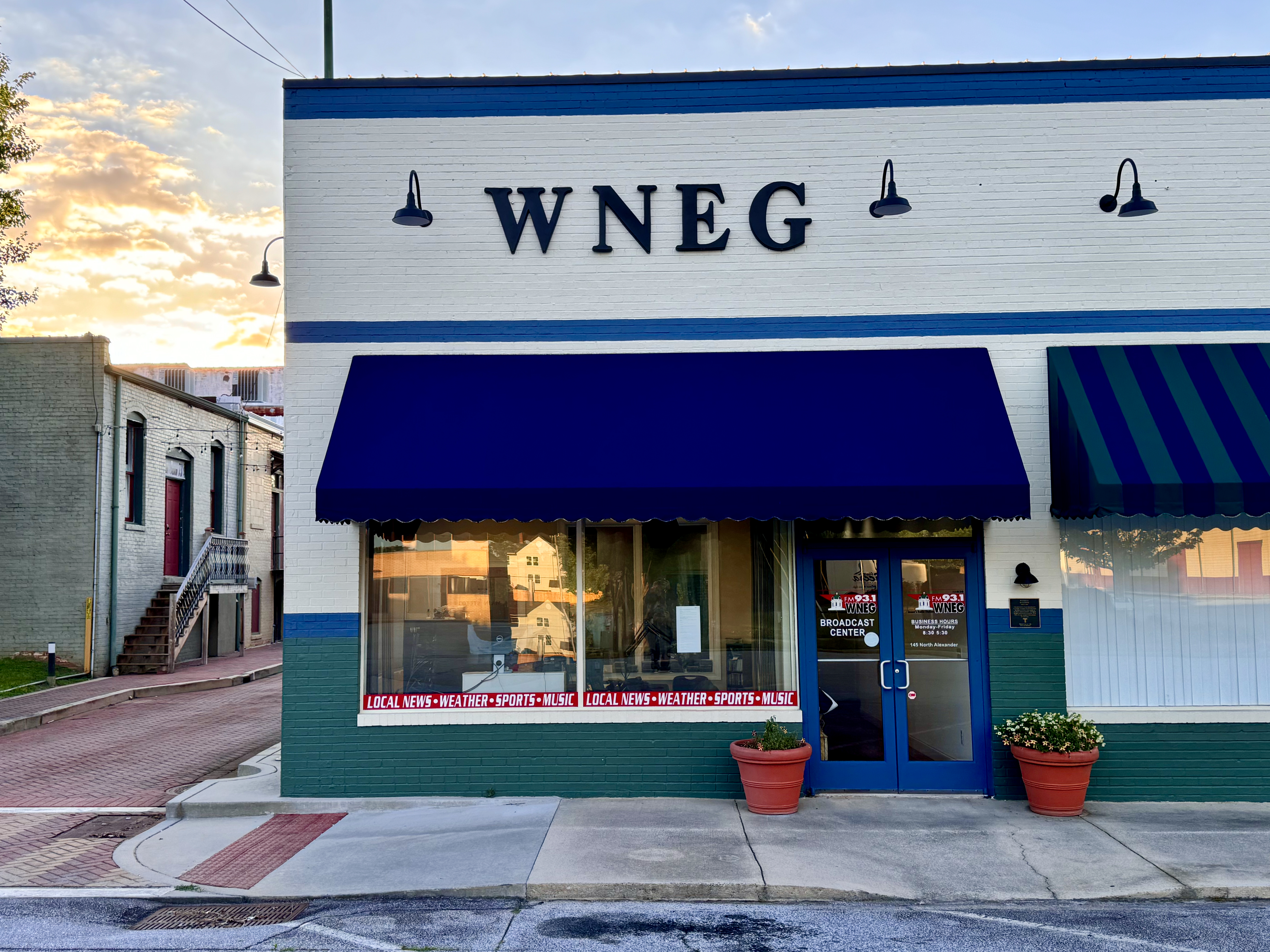
- Toccoa, Georgia; United States
- Frequency: 630 kHz
- Branding: FM 93.1 & AM 630

Programming
- Format: Classic hits
- Affiliations: NBC News Radio; Westwood One

Ownership
- Owner: Georgia-Carolina Radiocasting Company, LLC
- Sister stations: WTOC-FM

History
- First air date: April 21, 1956

Technical information
- Licensing authority: FCC
- Facility ID: 63330
- Class: D
- Power: 5,000 watts day; 44 watts night
- Transmitter coordinates: 34°34′4.4″N 83°19′25.6″W
- Translator: 93.1 W226BY (Toccoa)

Links
- Public license information: Public file; LMS
- Webcast: Listen live
- Website: www.wnegradio.com

WNEG (630 kHz) is a AM radio station broadcasting a classic hits format. Licensed to Toccoa, Georgia, United States, the station is owned by the Georgia-Carolina Radiocasting Company. On April 21, 2016, WNEG officially began broadcasting on 93.1 FM, which was also the station's 60th anniversary.

== See also ==
- WGTA (former sister station to WNEG radio)
