= Global Health College =

Private nursing school in Alexandria, Virginia, U.S.

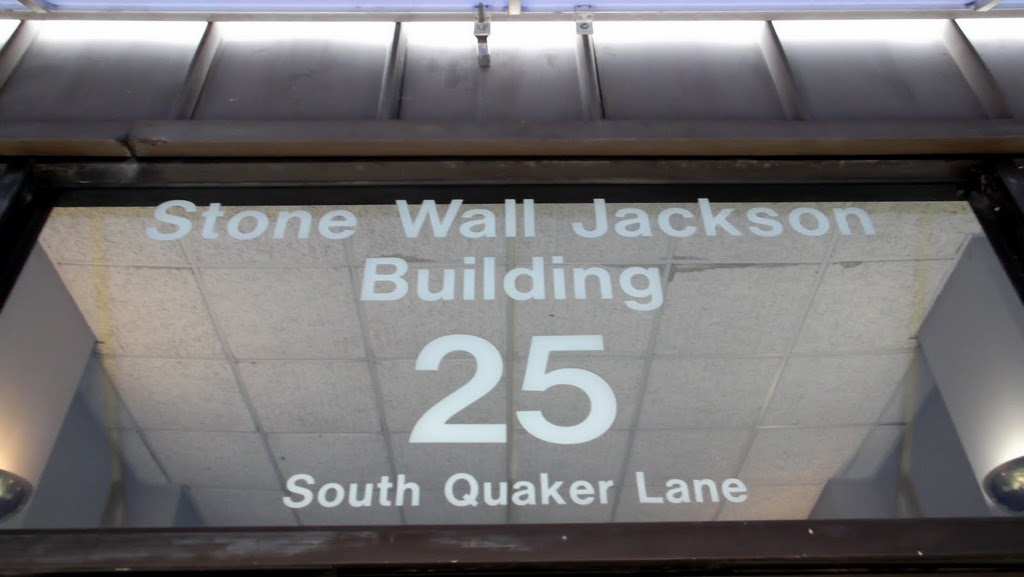
- Type: Private for-profit nursing school
- Established: 2004
- Director: Mariatu K. Kargbo
- Students: 316
- Location: Alexandria, Virginia, United States; 38°48′47.6″N 77°8′18.2″W
- Campus: Suburban
- Website: www.global.edu

Global Health College is a private for-profit nursing school in Alexandria, Virginia. It offers a Practical Nursing program, an Associate in Applied Science in Nursing degree for Registered Nurses, and a Certified Nursing Assistant program.

== History ==
The founder and director of the school is Mariatu Kargbo. A graduate of George Mason University, where she obtained her degrees in marketing and nursing, she ended up working as an RN in a medical-surgical unit and the ICU. She went back to school to complete her master's degree in Nursing with a specialty as a Family Nurse Practitioner from a George Mason/George Washington program. After being employed for 6 months as a Family Nurse Practitioner at the Northern Virginia Family Practice she founded Global Health Nurse Training Services in 2004. In 2011, GHNTS became Global Health College and expanded, allowing the creation of more classrooms and a library. In October, the school participated in the Alexandria West End Art and Wine Festival. GHC received full accreditation from the Accrediting Council for Independent Colleges and Schools (ACICS) in May 2012.

== Facilities ==
Global Health is located off of Duke Street just west of Old Town, across from Landmark shopping center. In addition to a student lounge and campus bookstore it offers a simulation lab, skills lab, library, computer lab and testing lab.

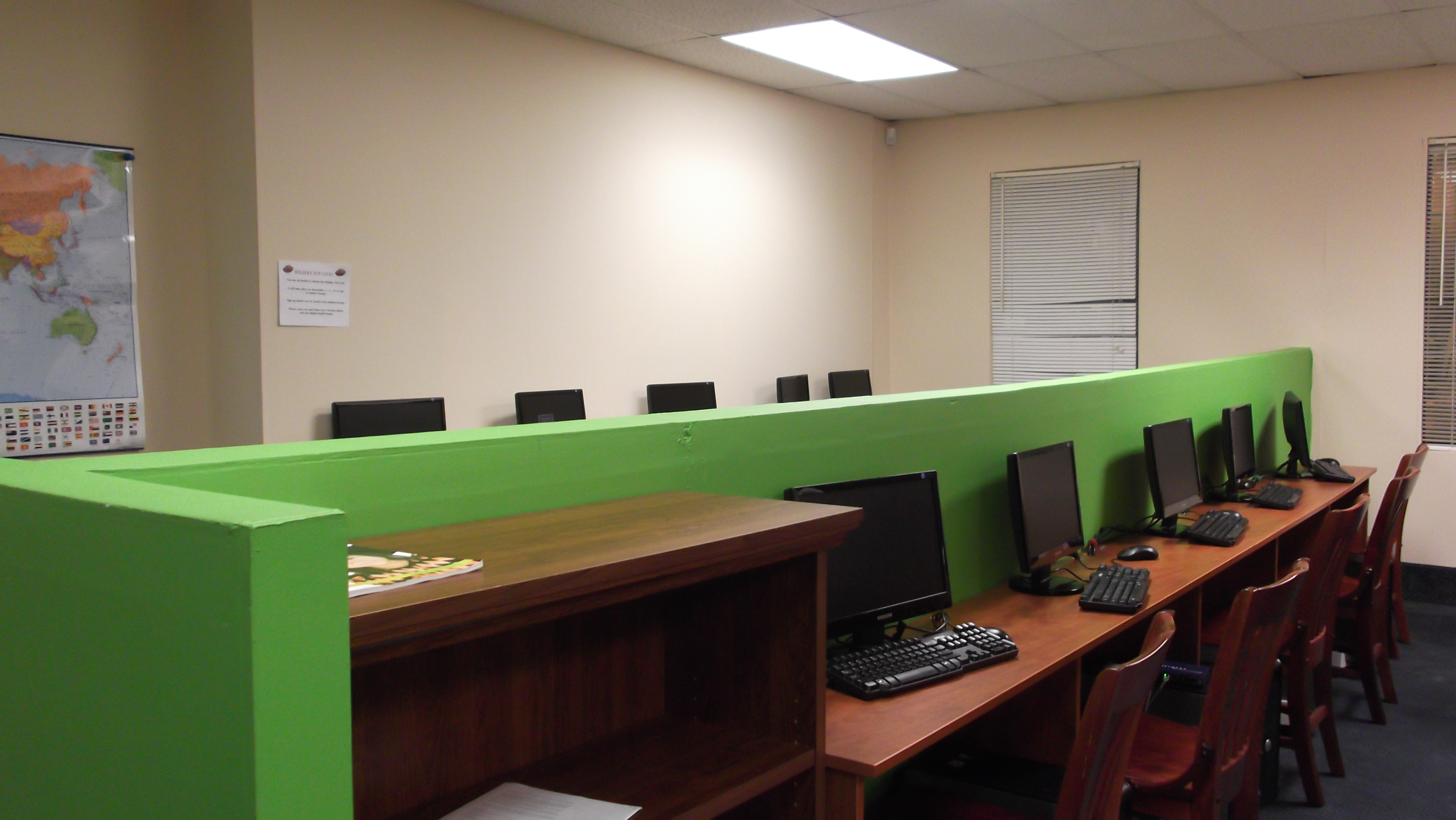
Campus computer lab

== Admissions ==
New students must have a high school diploma, GED or 24 hours of college credit, CPR certification, and a letter of recommendation. They must also be current in their immunizations and have had a physical examination and a criminal background check. Before acceptance new students must pass a standardized entrance exam.

== Accreditation ==
GHC is certified by the State Council of Higher Education of Virginia (SCHEV) and the practical nursing program is accredited by the National League for Nursing Accreditation Commission (NLNAC). It operates by the standards set by the Virginia Board of Nursing. The college was formerly accredited by the Accrediting Council for Independent Colleges and Schools (ACICS), which was de-recognized by the Department of Education on December 12, 2016.
