= WUPA =

Television station in Atlanta

- Atlanta, Georgia; United States
- Channels: Digital: 36 (UHF); Virtual: 69
- Branding: CBS Atlanta; CBS News Atlanta

Programming
- Affiliations: 69.1: CBS; for others, see § Technical information and subchannels

Ownership
- Owner: CBS Television Stations; (Atlanta Television Station WUPA Inc.)

History
- First air date: August 22, 1981
- Former call signs: WVEU (1981–1995)
- Former channel numbers: Analog: 69 (UHF, 1981–2009); Digital: 43 (UHF, 2001–2019)
- Former affiliations: Independent (1981–1995; 2023–2025); Superstar TV (1981–1983); UPN (1995–2006); The CW (2006–2023)
- Call sign meaning: United Paramount Atlanta, for its former affiliation

Technical information
- Licensing authority: FCC
- Facility ID: 6900
- ERP: 1,000 kW
- HAAT: 328.6 m (1,078 ft)
- Transmitter coordinates: 33°48′26.4″N 84°20′21.5″W

Links
- Public license information: Public file; LMS
- Website: cbsnews.com/atlanta

WUPA (channel 69), branded as CBS Atlanta, is a television station in Atlanta, Georgia, United States. The station is owned and operated by the CBS television network through its CBS Television Stations division, and maintains studios on Northeast Expressway (I-85) in unincorporated DeKalb County; its transmitter is located in northeastern Atlanta, near North Druid Hills.

Channel 69 in Atlanta first began broadcasting in 1981 as independent station WVEU. Years of technical issues provoked by interference to mobile radio users and consequent limitations on the station's operating hours and signal strength contributed to the failure of subscription television (STV) and a music video service that operated the station. WVEU's local founders sold the station to CBS in 1994 at a time when CBS needed to find a new affiliate in Atlanta, but the network was able to negotiate to affiliate with another, more built-up station instead. WVEU became an affiliate of UPN and was then sold to the Paramount Stations Group. Under the new WUPA call sign, Paramount substantially improved the station's programming and ratings in the years that followed before UPN was replaced with The CW in 2006. After successive owner Paramount Global sold the majority of its stake in The CW to Nexstar Media Group in 2022, WUPA disaffiliated from the network on September 1, 2023, reverting to independent status. Less than two years later, WUPA assumed the CBS affiliation for Atlanta as a network-owned station.

== WVEU ==
=== Construction, land mobile dispute, and STV years (1981–1984) ===
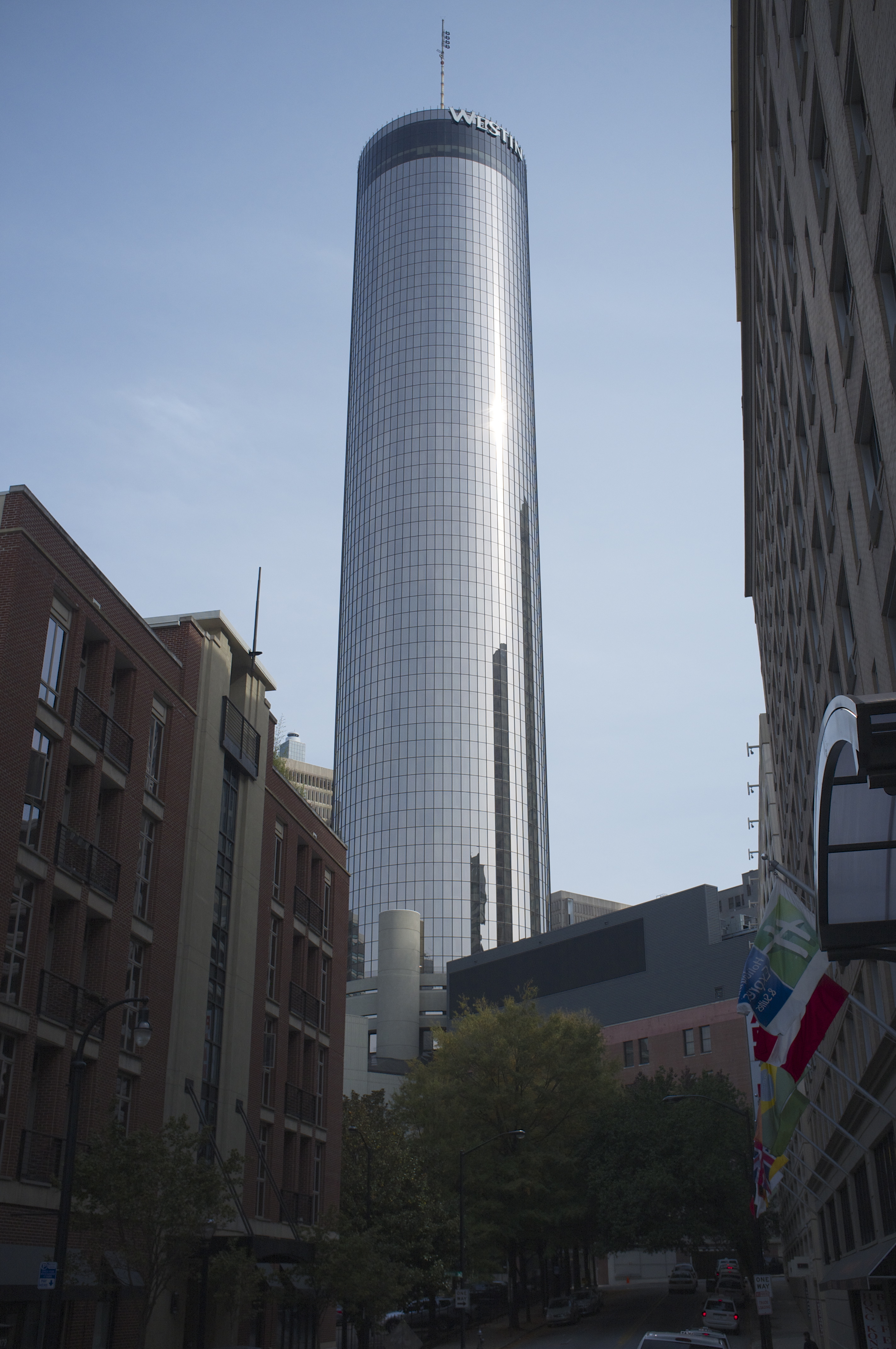
The Peachtree Plaza Hotel was the original transmitter site for WVEU.

In 1978, the Federal Communications Commission (FCC) received two applications for new television stations to use channel 69 in Atlanta; on August 19, 1980, the final decision was given to award it to a consortium of Atlanta-based investors known as Broadcast Corporation of Georgia (BCG), which proposed a hybrid operation consisting of conventional ad-supported programming in the daytime and a subscription television (STV) service in evening hours. BCG's majority owner, Atlanta attorney David Harris, was approached by backers of a California STV company whom he thought were merely seeking advice on how to build the station. The antenna atop the Peachtree Plaza Hotel from which channel 69 would radiate had been hoisted into place in mid-August, days before the license decision was publicized. The subscription programming would be supplied under the Superstar TV name by Subscription Television of Greater Atlanta, a consortium originally reported to be co-owned by Clint Murchison—who had subscription television holdings in other cities, including the Super TV service in the Washington, D.C., and Baltimore markets—and Atlanta electronics manufacturer Dynacom, which would produce the decoders subscribers would need to view Superstar programming. In actuality, the owner was not Clint Murchison but Clyde A. Murchison, whom a 1982 article in The Atlanta Constitution described as Clint's great-nephew. (Note: Clyde Murchison was not related to Clint at all. This supposed connection became highly relevant when Clyde Murchison attempted to put together a radio station group known as Radioactivity Broadcast Group in 1988. Other investors in the firm conducted due diligence on Clyde. They discovered he was of no relation after a friend of the actual Murchison family—who had met one of the Radioactivity investors by chance at a party in New York—failed to recognize him, while a background check did not substantiate degrees Clyde claimed to have received from Harvard University and Stanford University, leading to the investors contacting the FBI. Murchison was then arrested on charges of wire fraud, having also forged documents including a supposed $6.4 million letter of credit from Chase Manhattan Bank. He pleaded guilty and was sentenced to one year in prison in 1989.)

WVEU began broadcasting on August 22, 1981. However, a planned full launch on October 1 had to be scuttled because the station's broadcasts on channel 69—at the top of the TV band, 800 to 806 MHz—were interfering with two-way land mobile radio transmissions. Further, the station had planned to fill daytime hours with programming from a business news service known as The Market Report, which ran into financial difficulties and was unable to start on time. Superstar TV was able to begin operating before the end of the year, with an official kickoff held on January 8, 1982. The FCC continued to curtail WVEU's operating hours; WVEU was only allowed to sign on after 7 p.m. on weekdays and after 3 p.m. on Saturdays, though it was allowed to operate all day on Sundays. It only offered commercial, non-STV programming on Sundays from 7 a.m. to 3 p.m., running Superstar TV at all other times it was on the air.

The two-way radio dispute continued to loom large over every facet of WVEU's operations for several years, as the station subsisted on production contracts. In June 1983, the FCC ruled that the station could begin operating at 50 percent power before 7 p.m. if it paid an estimated $250,000 to relocate all of the land mobile users affected by interference. However, these users protested the decision and filed for reconsideration with the commission. In February 1984, the FCC ordered the station to engage the users or pay them to relocate on penalty of losing the provisional program test authority under which WVEU had operated since 1981. While the dispute was resolved by July 1984, when the FCC granted a full license to BCG, the issue had doomed Superstar TV, which filed for bankruptcy in April 1983 and made its last broadcasts on the morning of July 23 with fewer than 3,000 subscribers.

=== The independent years (1984–1995) ===
To replace Superstar TV, WVEU signed an operating agreement with VideoMusic Channel, which had broadcast music videos on Atlanta-area cable systems, to program nearly all of channel 69's airtime. The station brought the programming in-house in August 1984 before eventually canceling it altogether and replacing it with syndicated shows and reruns because, it learned, music videos were not very "salable" to advertisers. That same year, negotiations were held and an initial agreement reached to sell the station to the RBP Corporation of Massachusetts, but no transaction was consummated.

The station also made its first entry into the television sports market, airing what was to be a package of 30 Atlanta Hawks NBA games in the 1984–85 season, with John Sterling as the play-by-play announcer. This package was whittled down to 19 games because of insufficient advertiser interest. A new 20-game package was carried in the following season, this time with the Hawks selling the advertising time; the Hawks later added a game at The Omni that sold out, their first home telecast in two years.

We are owned by six people, none of whom is extremely wealthy. We are, then, at a competitive disadvantage when it comes to funds. At the same time, we never make a purchase for which we don't know how we are going to pay. We have almost no debt.

— Vance Eckersley, general manager, WVEU, on the station's programming resources

Through the mid-1990s, WVEU became Atlanta's television station of last resort while a stabilizing WATL (channel 36) and a growing WGNX (channel 46) became the city's primary local independents. In a 1991 article by Prentis Rogers in The Atlanta Constitution, it was described as the city's "quicker picker-upper", constantly airing shows that the local network affiliates passed on. These included CBS's morning news program (under the titles of the CBS Morning News, The Morning Program, and CBS This Morning) from 1986 through 1994 and its late night programming, as well as numerous preempted network sports telecasts that the local affiliates could not air due to scheduling conflicts. Beyond displaced network programs, WVEU featured an eclectic mix, a function of being what Business Atlanta writer Russell Shaw called the "poor cousin" of Atlanta independent television. There were telecasts of martial arts movies under the banner Black Belt Theater and later hosted by Morgus the Magnificent, a character first introduced decades prior in Detroit and New Orleans; professional wrestling; a weekday public access show, Community; The Auto Doctor, a locally produced weekly magazine show about cars; and jazz music video show Jazz Beat. After another proposed sale, this one to the Home Shopping Network in 1989, fell through, the station added Japanese-language programming under the title 600 Station to its morning lineup.

=== Almost a CBS affiliate ===
On May 23, 1994, New World Communications announced an affiliation deal with Fox to switch the affiliations of most of New World's stations to the network. One of the stations involved was WAGA-TV (channel 5), which would replace Fox-owned WATL as that network's Atlanta outlet. This left CBS in the position of seeking a new Atlanta-area affiliate. This occurred after Fox won the rights to air NFC football games beginning that year.

In July, BCG approached CBS and proposed to sell WVEU to the network. Two months later, CBS had still not lined up a new affiliate in Atlanta, even though WAGA was due to join Fox at year's end. Unable to find a higher-profile station, CBS agreed to buy WVEU for $22 million and relaunch it as a CBS owned-and-operated station. Bill Carter of The New York Times called CBS's purchases of WVEU and WGPR-TV in Detroit "little more than acquisitions of broadcasting licenses" because the stations lacked the facilities and staff typical of network affiliates. For this reason, a CBS move to WVEU would have meant an unprecedented campaign to build up the station, including major expenses in promotion and starting a local news department. One consultant interviewed by The Atlanta Journal and Constitution estimated that CBS would have to spend as much as $100 million over several years to build out WVEU. Those expenses potentially included replacing channel 69's facilities off I-85, which were of inadequate size for a full-service, news-producing station. In return, while CBS was guaranteed to have an affiliate, it faced the prospect of steep ratings declines for the CBS Evening News and had a much weaker signal than the outgoing WAGA. For the outgoing Broadcast Corporation of Georgia, and particularly for majority owner David Harris, the sale to CBS was an unexpected windfall. WVEU had never turned a profit in its 13-year history; in 1993, it became cash flow-positive for the first time in its history.

As 1994 continued, CBS took only minimal steps to close on the purchase and continued to campaign for a better partner. The network continued to negotiate with Fox and with Tribune Broadcasting, then-owner of WGNX. By mid-November, CBS had not filed paperwork for the deal at the FCC, even though WAGA was scheduled to join Fox within a month. CBS executives refused to confirm that they were still moving forward with the deal. On November 16, it was announced that CBS would not be moving to WVEU but instead to WGNX. CBS had preferred to move to a station that already aired local news, even if it was only an affiliate; WGNX was the only independent station in the market that already had a functioning news department. CBS, which only regarded WVEU as a "safety net" per Phil Kloer of The Journal and Constitution, committed to buy the station and immediately resell it.

== WUPA: The UPN and CW years ==
=== UPN affiliation (1995–2006) ===
Even though channel 69 was not to be the CBS affiliate in Atlanta, WVEU emerged from the sale to CBS having secured a valuable network affiliation. WATL aligned with the upstart WB network for January 1995, and the new United Paramount Network (UPN) still had not signed up an Atlanta affiliate. With no other realistic options available, UPN signed an agreement with WVEU in December, a month before its launch. Behind UPN came a buyer: the Paramount Stations Group, which began to negotiate with CBS to acquire WVEU. Paid programming was reduced from 40 hours a week to 13, and stronger syndicated and UPN shows lifted channel 69's ratings.

In May 1995, CBS agreed to sell WVEU to Viacom, the parent company of the Paramount Stations Group, for $27 million; to stay under the 12-station ownership limit of the time, the company sold one of its non-UPN stations, KSLA in Shreveport, Louisiana. After closing on the purchase, Viacom began a significant makeover of the station. This included a new call sign, WUPA (for United Paramount/Atlanta), which it assumed on December 11, as well as a more aggressive stance to purchasing syndicated programming. Household ratings tripled, and the network recognized WUPA as its first affiliate of the year.

In the late 1990s, WUPA began to add local sports programming. When TBS converted from a superstation to a basic cable channel, it was forced to reduce the number of Atlanta Braves baseball games it telecast. WUPA picked up an 11-game package of Braves games sold by TBS for the 1998 season, which became a 30-game package for 1999 before being reclaimed for the new Turner South regional cable channel in 2000. When Atlanta got a hockey team, the new Atlanta Thrashers aired 15 games a year on WUPA. The Hawks returned to channel 69 in 2001 after 15 years when their existing carrier, WHOT-TV (channel 34), was sold by USA Broadcasting to Univision.

Over the course of the early 2000s, WUPA sought to bolster its local identity. It changed its branding from "UPN 69" to "UPN Atlanta" in 2003 and began producing non-news specials; it also sponsored the Music Midtown festival. The station's transmitter was also relocated to northeastern Atlanta near North Druid Hills after its Westin Peachtree Plaza transmitter was unable to be upgraded for digital operation. On April 5, 2004, NBC affiliate WXIA-TV began producing a half-hour prime time newscast at 10 p.m. for WUPA titled UPN Atlanta News at Ten. This program, for which WXIA-TV sold the advertising, was accompanied by a separately produced, live half-hour talk program at 10:30 p.m. titled Atlanta Tonight. Up against stiff competition from the incumbent 10 p.m. newscast on WAGA, both programs seen on channel 69 suffered, and the 10 p.m. newscast and Atlanta Tonight were canceled on August 28, 2005, for "economic reasons".

=== The CW and independent status (2006–2025) ===
"CW69" logo (2008–2023)

"Atlanta 69" logo (2023–2025)

On January 24, 2006, the Warner Bros. unit of Time Warner and CBS Corporation (which had been created as a result of the split of Viacom at the start of the year) announced that the two companies would shut down The WB and UPN and combine the networks' respective programming to create a new "fifth" network called The CW; the day of the announcement, it was revealed that 11 of CBS Corporation's 15 UPN affiliates, including WUPA, would become CW stations.

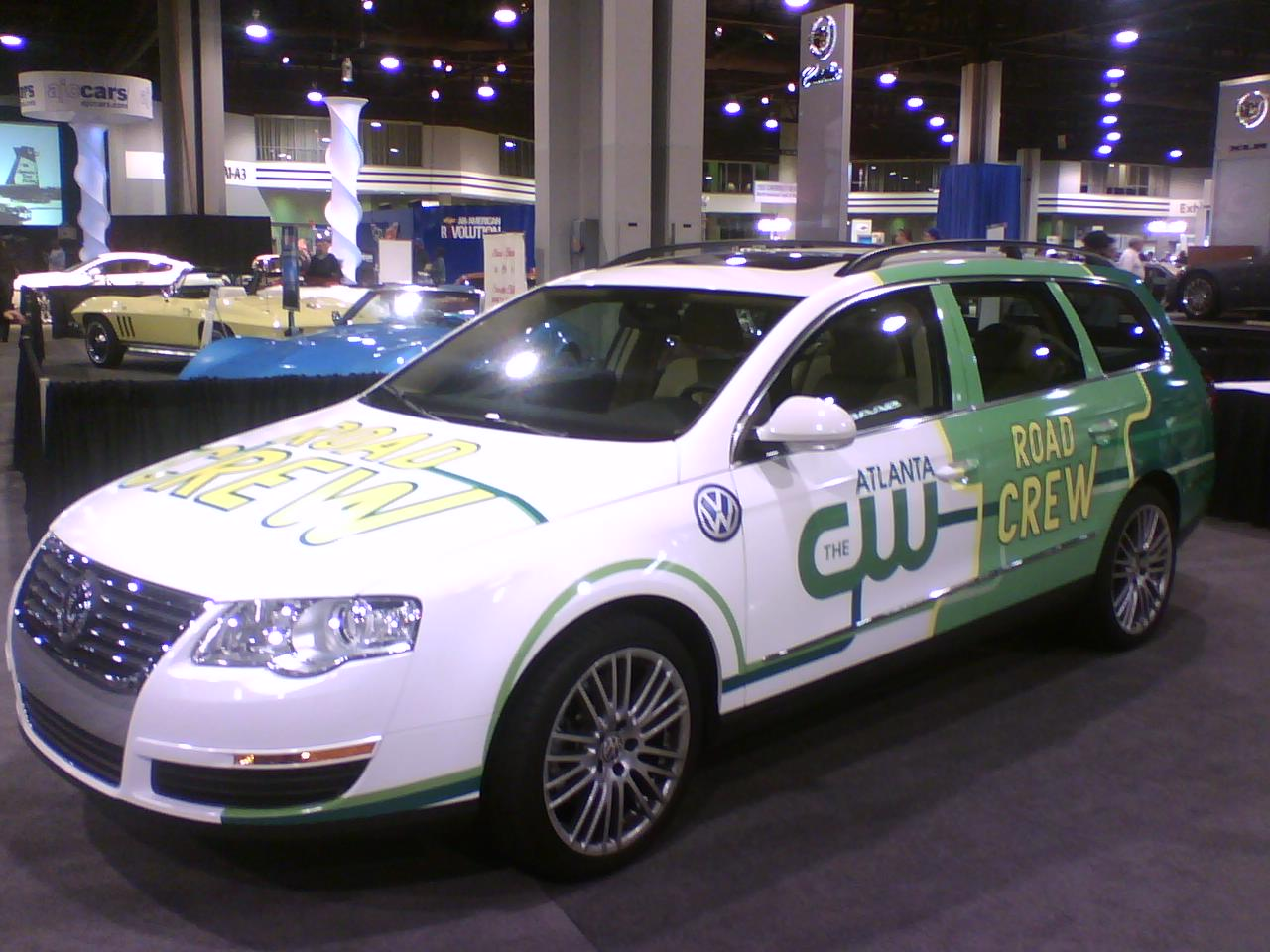
An "Atlanta CW Road Crew" vehicle at the 2007 AJC Auto Show

In 2014, WUPA became the official television station of the Atlanta Falcons, gaining rights to its preseason games and introducing weekly programs dedicated to the team. The preseason broadcasts were initially produced by CBS Sports but have been produced by Tupelo Raycom since 2017. The Falcons partnered with WAGA-TV in 2020.

In 2017, as part of a broadcasting deal with the city's new Major League Soccer franchise Atlanta United FC and Fox Sports Networks, WUPA began to air the team's overflow games. WUPA was replaced in this role by WPCH-TV for the 2022 season.

By 2019, WUPA's main local program was a weekly public affairs series, Focus Atlanta. On January 17, 2020, CBS Television Stations announced that it would be introducing a nightly 10 p.m. newscast for WUPA, produced by New York City sister station WCBS-TV; the program debuted February 17. In March 2020, following the temporary shutdown of the CBS Broadcast Center during the COVID-19 pandemic in New York City, and for the next five months, WUPA began simulcasting WBZ News at 10 from sister station WSBK-TV in Boston, with local coverage limited to a news ticker and prerecorded weather forecasts supplied by sister station WWJ-TV in Detroit.

On August 11, 2020, the Atlanta-oriented newscast was relaunched, with production shifted to KTVT in Fort Worth, Texas. On July 18, 2022, this newscast was relaunched as Atlanta Now News under a new hybrid local/national format which continued to be produced from Fort Worth.

Nexstar Media Group acquired majority ownership of The CW on October 3, 2022. Under the agreement, CBS was given the right to pull its affiliations from WUPA and its seven other CW stations. On May 5, 2023, CBS announced it would exercise that right and WUPA would cease airing the network's programming at the end of August, returning to independent status. The CW affiliation was moved to Gray Television-owned WPCH-TV as part of a larger contract extension between Gray and the network. The station was rebranded as "Atlanta 69" as part of a larger naming convention among the disaffiliated stations highlighting the city and channel number.

== As a CBS owned-and-operated station ==
Logo for CBS News Atlanta

On June 2, 2025, Gray announced that it would not renew WANF's CBS affiliation when it expired in mid-August 2025, and that it would convert the station to an independent. Paramount Global concurrently announced that WUPA would become the new CBS owned-and-operated station for Atlanta beginning August 16, 2025. Alongside the affiliation switch, CBS intended to launch an in-house news department, accompanied by a CBS News Atlanta streaming channel for local news and information.

On August 6, 2025, Paramount announced that Shawn Hoder, news director at KDKA-TV in Pittsburgh, would take the same role in Atlanta in preparation for the launch of CBS News Atlanta in September. CBS News and Stations president Jennifer Mitchell said that WUPA would be a station with a very deep connection to Atlanta, stressing that "we aren't just hiring a team–we are building one from the community". Ahead of the September launch of a news department, WUPA began airing local weather inserts during CBS Mornings on August 18, the first weekday after the change. Full 6 and 11 p.m. newscasts debuted September 15, with Jobina Fortson-Evans, previously of WANF, as lead anchor. The newscasts make heavy use of augmented reality and virtual reality, using technology adopted by other CBS owned-and-operated stations. The station progressively expanded its news offerings throughout 2026. A morning newscast at 6 a.m. debuted on February 2, anchored by Fortson-Evans; a 5 p.m. newscast debuted on April 13, anchored by Sharon Lawson; and a 12 p.m. newscast debuted on July 13, anchored by T. J. Anthony. In all, 100 people were hired from the launch of CBS Atlanta to September 2026. A further 11,000 square feet (1,000 m^{2}) in a second building is being renovated for CBS Atlanta, with occupancy slated for November 2026, providing space for another 40 employees.

=== Notable former on-air staff ===
- Dagmar Midcap – meteorologist, 2025–2026

== Technical information and subchannels ==
WUPA broadcasts from a tower in northeastern Atlanta, near North Druid Hills. Its signal is multiplexed:

Subchannels of WUPA
Subchannel	Res.	Short name	Programming
69.1	1080i	WUPA-HD	CBS
69.2	480i	StartTV	Start TV
69.3	480i	COMET	Comet
69.4	480i	MeTV	MeTV (WGTA)
69.5	480i	365 BLK	365BLK
69.6	480i	Charge!	Charge!
69.7	480i	H & I	Heroes & Icons (WGTA)

Simulcast of subchannels of another station

=== Analog-to-digital conversion ===
WUPA shut down its analog signal, over UHF channel 69, on June 12, 2009, as part of the federally mandated transition from analog to digital television; its digital broadcasts remained on UHF channel 43, using virtual channel 69.

The station was repacked from channel 43 to 36 in 2019.
