= Gerald Jay Goldberg =

American author (1929–2020)

- Born: December 30, 1929
- Died: June 2, 2020 (aged 90)
- Education: Bronx High School of Science; Purdue University (BS); New York University (MA); University of Minnesota (PhD)
- Occupation: Author
- Spouse: Nancy Marmer (m. 1954)
- Children: 1
- Relatives: Michael Goldberg (brother)
- Website: geraldjaygoldberg.com

Gerald Jay Goldberg (December 30, 1929 – June 2, 2020) was an American author. He was a professor emeritus at the University of California, Los Angeles, where he taught English and American literature and Creative Writing. An acclaimed novelist, he was also a critic and the author (with Robert Goldberg) of a nonfiction study of the network news and a biography of Ted Turner.

== Literary career ==
Goldberg's best-known work, The Lynching of Orin Newfield, is a powerful novel about a “communal murder ... in a small farming town in Vermont.” His novels and short stories—ranging widely in setting, subject, and technique—were intense, witty, and elegantly crafted. Reviewers compared his crisp prose and caustic humor to Nathanael West, Donald Barthelme, Joseph Heller and Thomas McGuane. Saul Bellow's description of McGuane as "a language star" is, in fact, an apt description for Goldberg as well. His command of metaphor and detail (like McGuane's) was remarkable, each sentence precisely, relentlessly original. "His prose sparkles," The New York Times wrote, "with well-observed idiosyncrasies." The Chicago Sun-Times ranked Goldberg's 126 Days of Continuous Sunshine with Thomas Pynchon's The Crying of Lot 49 for its evocation of “California insanity.” The Los Angeles Herald Examiner praised Heart Payments for its “wonderful textured evocation of the L.A. art scene of the late 1960s.” Writing in Art News magazine's 100th Anniversary Issue, art critic Peter Plagens called Heart Payments "the best novel about an artist I've ever read." Of The Lynching of Orin Newfield, The New Yorker concluded: “The tension and clarity of Mr. Goldberg’s writing leave us no choice but to follow his raging anti-hero’s story from the comparatively mild beginning to the thundering finish.”

In 2012, Goldberg began a series of stylish thrillers under the nom de plume of Gerald Jay. Set in France, they feature Inspector Paul Mazarelle, a detective called "charming" and "indomitable" by Publishers Weekly. The first work in the series, The Paris Directive, was referred to by Christopher Reich as a "beguiling, atmospheric, and entirely entertaining novel." The Mystery Tribune called Gerald Jay "truly a master in elegant use of language and a bright star in the world of crime fiction." The second installment in the series, The Hanged Man's Tale, is scheduled for publication at the beginning of December, 2021.

There was considerable Hollywood interest in Orin Newfield, following its publication in 1970. Though never produced, the novel was optioned by Buck Henry, Victor Drai Productions and James B. Harris. Goldberg himself wrote a screenplay for Universal. Jerry Harvey, programming chief of Los Angeles's legendary Z channel, nearly succeeded in bringing Orin Newfield to the screen. Before Harvey's death in 1988, he had arranged for Sam Peckinpah to direct the film.

Goldberg's two nonfiction “media” books (Anchors and Citizen Turner, both co-authored with his son, Robert Goldberg) were widely praised and translated into several languages. Anchors was reprinted in Reader’s Digest’s Today’s Best Nonfiction (1991). Citizen Turner is, by critical consensus, the best of the many biographies of Turner.

== Biography ==
After attending the Bronx High School of Science, Goldberg earned his undergraduate degree at Purdue University (BS, 1952), where he was a member of the wrestling team and the Purdue Players. He received his master's degree at NYU (MA 1955), and his PhD at University of Minnesota in 1958. His doctoral dissertation was "The Artist as Hero in Modern British Fiction, 1890-1930."

Goldberg taught at Dartmouth College (1958–1964) and at the University of California, Los Angeles (1964–1991), where he was professor of English emeritus. He was a visiting professor at the University of Zaragoza, Spain (Fulbright professorship, 1962–63), Williams College (1981) and Queens College, City University of New York (1985–87). With Nancy Marmer, he co-edited Faulkner Studies and was the co-founder of Critique: Studies in Modern Fiction.

In 1954, Goldberg married art critic, Nancy Marmer (formerly managing editor and book review editor of Art in America). Their son, Robert Goldberg (formerly TV critic for The Wall Street Journal) is a prizewinning writer and filmmaker. Goldberg's brother, Michael Goldberg (1924–2007), was a well-known abstract expressionist painter.

== Criticism ==
- Editor (with Nancy Marmer Goldberg) The Modern Critical Spectrum, Englewood Cliffs, N.J.: Prentice-Hall, 1962.
- The Fate of Innocence, Englewood Cliffs, N.J.: Prentice-Hall, 1965.

== Fiction ==
- Notes from the Diaspora, Hanover, N.H.: Atelier 21, 1962. (Limited edition with original pen-and-ink drawings by Nancy Marmer)
- The National Standard, New York: Holt, Rinehart and Winston, 1968.
- The Lynching of Orin Newfield, New York: The Dial Press, 1970. (Selected as “Notable Book of the Year” by the "New York Times" in 1970)
- 126 Days of Continuous Sunshine, New York: The Dial Press, 1972.
- Heart Payments, New York: The Viking Press, 1982. (Named “Best Twentieth-Century Novel about an Artist” by Art News, 2000)
- (Goldberg writing as Gerald Jay)The Paris Directive, New York: Nan A. Talese/Knopf, Doubleday, 2012.
- (Writing as Gerald Jay and in collaboration with his family) The Hanged Man's Tale, New York: Nan A. Talese/Doubleday, forthcoming in December, 2021.

== Non-fiction ==
- (with Robert Goldberg) Anchors: Brokaw, Jennings, Rather and the Evening News, New York: Birch Lane Press, 1990. (Finalist for the National Association of Broadcasters 1990 “Media Book of the Year Award”)
- (with Robert Goldberg) Citizen Turner: The Wild Rise of an American Tycoon, New York: Harcourt Brace & Company, 1995.
