= Saint Bernardino Preaching (Sano di Pietro) =

Painting by Sano di Pietro

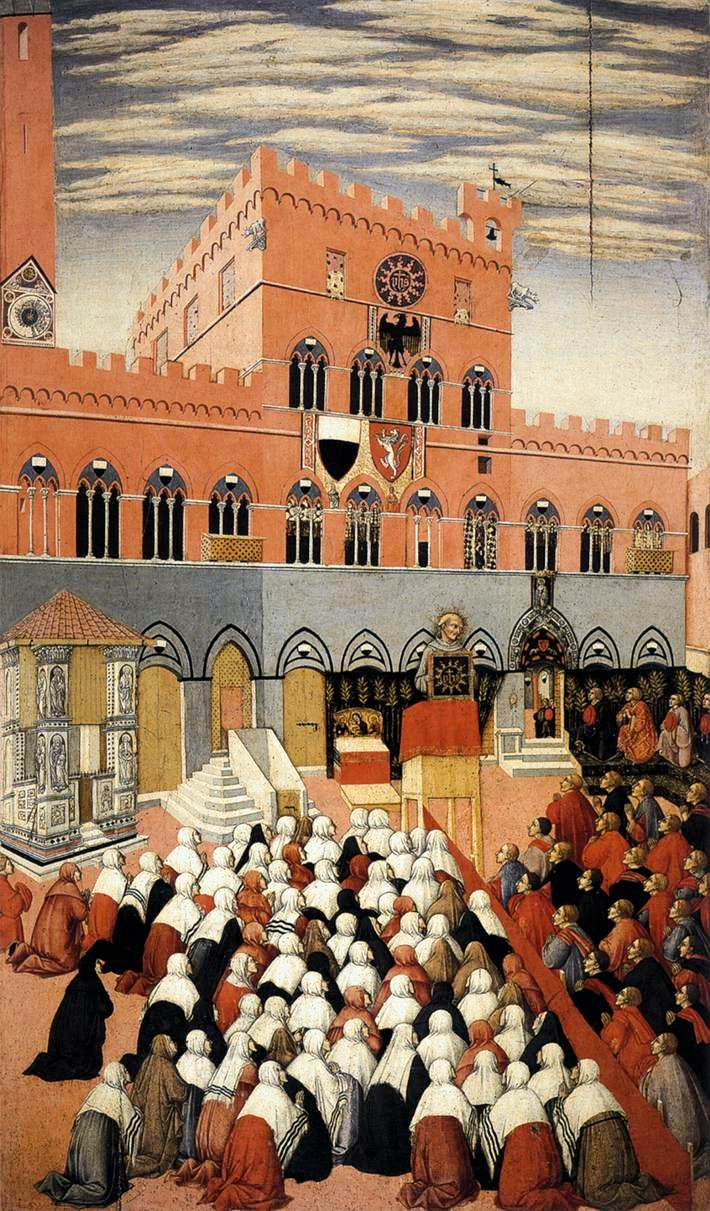
Campo panel.

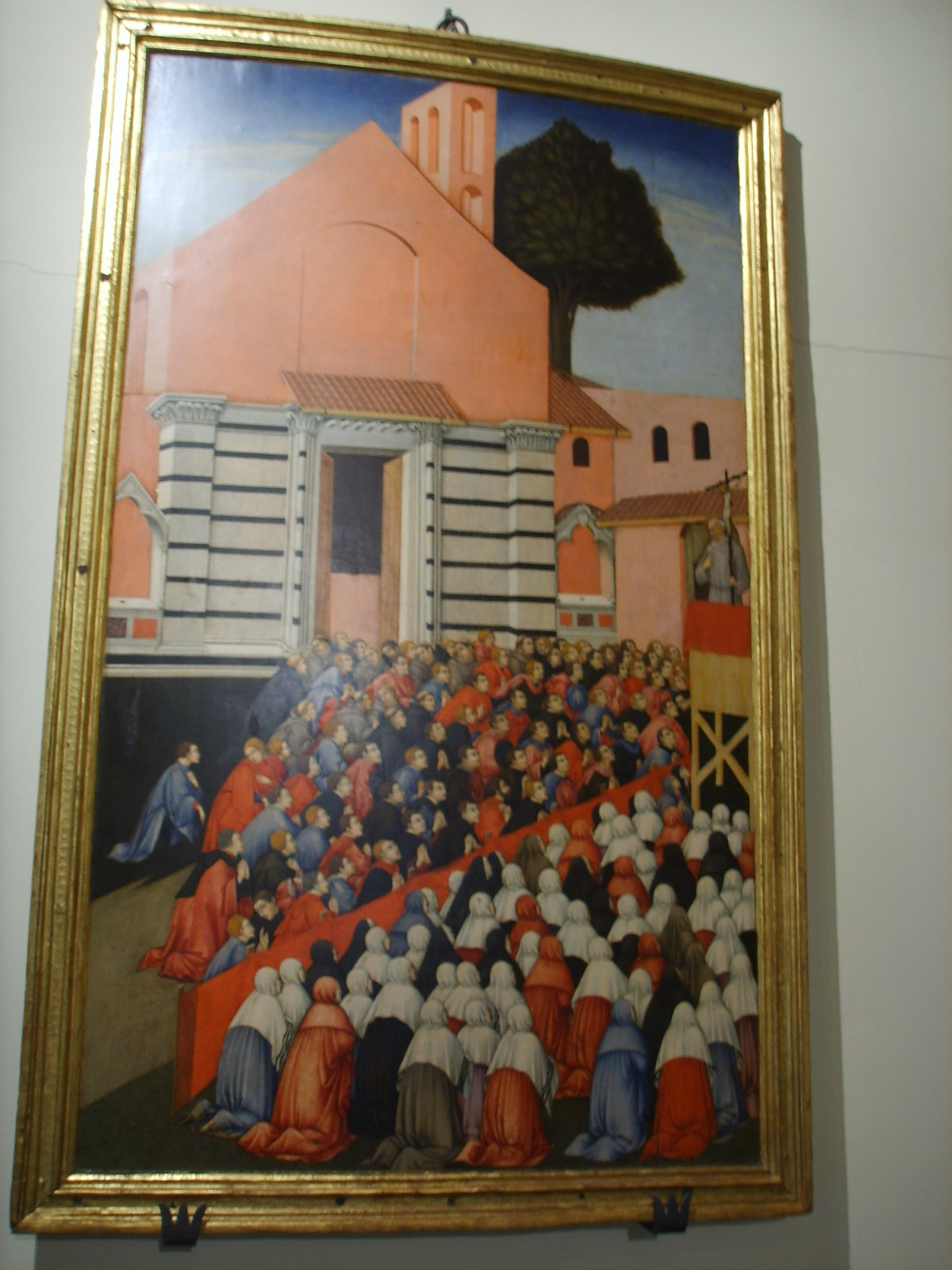
Basilica panel.

Saint Bernardino Preaching is a 1445 tempera on panel painting of Bernardino of Siena by Sano di Pietro. It was originally made up of several panels, of which two are now in the Museo dell'Opera del Duomo in Siena.

== History ==
There was a strong devotion to Bernardino, a Franciscan preacher who died in 1444. Under pressure from Observants in the town, the government of Siena initiated the process to have him recognised as a saint, though this only occurred in 1450. In May 1445 it (via the Company of the Virgin) also commissioned Sano di Pietro to celebrate his memory in paint. He produced three paintings for display in Siena Cathedral:

- Saint Bernardino Preaching in the Campo of Siena, in front of the Palazzo Pubblico (official ceremony).
- Saint Bernardino Preaching in front of the Basilica of San Francesco (popular ceremony)
- Saint Bernardino Rising to Paradise

They may have formed part of a multi-panel altarpiece, along with two standing portraits of the saint, as suggested by the diagonal composition of the parapets separating the men and women on the two panels showing very recognisable monuments in Siena.

== Bibliography (in French) ==
- Daniel Arasse, Saint Bernardin de Sienne - Entre dévotion et culture : fonctions de l'image religieuse au XVe siecle, Hazan, 2014 ISBN 978 2 7541 0255 1
