= Saint Bernardino Heals Donna Perna =

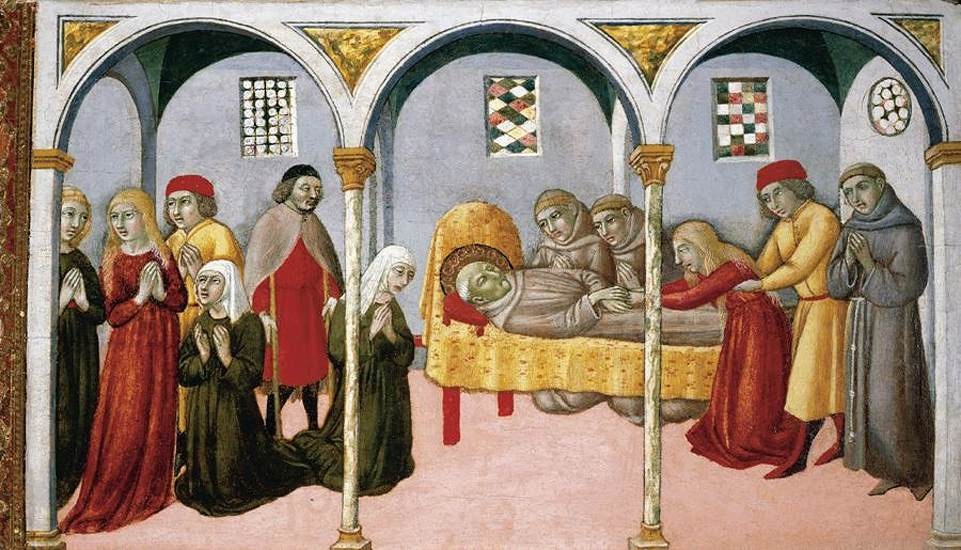

Saint Bernardino Heals Donna Perna is a tempera and gold left on panel painting by Sano di Pietro, produced after 1450 and now in a private collection. It and two other panels originally formed a predella.

== Description ==
It shows a miracle which occurred a week after Bernardino of Siena's canonisation on 22 May 1450 by pope Nicholas V. The canonisation was marked by bringing the new saint's body out of his tomb to show to the crowd - one of them was a paralysed woman, Donna Perna, wife of Matteo Pettrucci, a notable man in the city, who was healed on approaching the body.

It formed part of a series of works showing posthumous miracles effected by the saint, with Perugino and Pinturicchio also producing works on the subject.

== Bibliography (in French) ==
- Daniel Arasse, Saint Bernardin de Sienne - Entre dévotion et culture : fonctions de l'image religieuse au 15th century, Hazan, 2014 ISBN 978 2 7541 0255 1
