= Louis Marin (philosopher) =

French philosopher, historian, semiotician, art historian and art critic

Louis Marin (French: [lwi maʁɛ̃]; 22 May 1931 – 29 October 1992) was a French philosopher, historian, semiotician, and art critic.

== Biography ==
He was born in La Tronche, France. He is a French post-structuralistic thinker. He attended the University of Paris, Sorbonne and graduated with a Licence in Philosophy in 1952. His degree was followed in 1953 with an Agrégé in Philosophy and with a Docteur d'Etat in 1973. Marin taught at the University of Nanterre, Paris from 1967 to 1970, the University of California, San Diego from 1970 to 1974, Johns Hopkins University from 1974 to 1977, and finally at the École des Hautes Études en Sciences Sociales in Paris from 1977 to 1992. He was also an Associate of the Humanities Center at Johns Hopkins University from 1985 until his death in 1992 in Paris.

Marin was widely known for his work in a variety of areas: linguistics, semiotics, theology, philosophy, anthropology, rhetoric, art, and institutional history and literary theory. Throughout his career, Marin's main intellectual focus was seventeenth-century French literature and art, particularly the works of Blaise Pascal, Perrault, Nicolas Poussin, and Philippe de Champaigne. In addition, he published numerous articles on the visual arts, religious texts and utopias.

Louis Marin has a lesser reputation than some of his contemporaries and friends, such as Jacques Derrida, Jean-François Lyotard and Michel de Certeau. Still, his classes and his work have exerted a profound influence on certain historians (Christian Jouhaud), art historians (Daniel Arasse), and literary historians (Hélène Merlin-Kajman, Joan DeJean).
