= Henriette Arasse =

French art critic and teacher (1912–2003)

- Born: Henriette Elizabeth Lavergne; 25 February 1912; 14th arrondissement, Paris, France
- Died: 29 January 2003 (aged 90); 17th arrondissement, Paris, France
- Education: École normale supérieure
- Occupations: Art critic; teacher
- Spouse: Raymond Arasse (m. 1938; died 1990)
- Children: Daniel Arasse

Henriette Arasse (25 February 1912 – 29 January 2003) was a French art critic and teacher. She was also mother of the art historian, Daniel Arasse.

== Biography ==
Daughter of Albert Lavergne, a soldier, Henriette Lavergne began an academic career. In 1934, she was accepted into the École normale supérieure as part of the literary promotion. She was one of the forty-one graduates of the École Normale Supérieure who passed the exam before it became reserved for men in 1940. In 1938, she was admitted to the agrégation de lettres, the nineteenth, and is appointed teacher in literary preparatory classes at the Lycée Molière alongside Suzanne Rey.

In November 1938, she married Raymond Arasse in Algiers. Born in 1912 in Tours, he was admitted to the École Normale Supérieure as part of the literary promotion in 1933 and was admitted to the agrégation de lettres in 1936, the fifth. From their union was born Daniel Arasse, French art historian.

Committed to the Franco-Ancienne, she was an independent candidate for the Secondary Education Council in 1958. Auditioned in 1964 by the higher education study commission, she recalled her attachment to Latin, which she taught.

She died on January 29, 2003.

== Publications ==
- Théophile Gautier art critic, Algiers, National Museum of Fine Arts, 1957 (BnF 41660375)
- Françoise Escoffier, Luis Marsans illustrates Proust, Revue des Deux Mondes, November 1982, p. 506-511
