= Michael Goldberg (painter) =

American painter (1924–2007)

- Born: December 24, 1924; Bronx, New York
- Died: December 31, 2007 (aged 83)
- Education: Art Students League of New York
- Known for: Painting
- Movement: Abstract expressionism

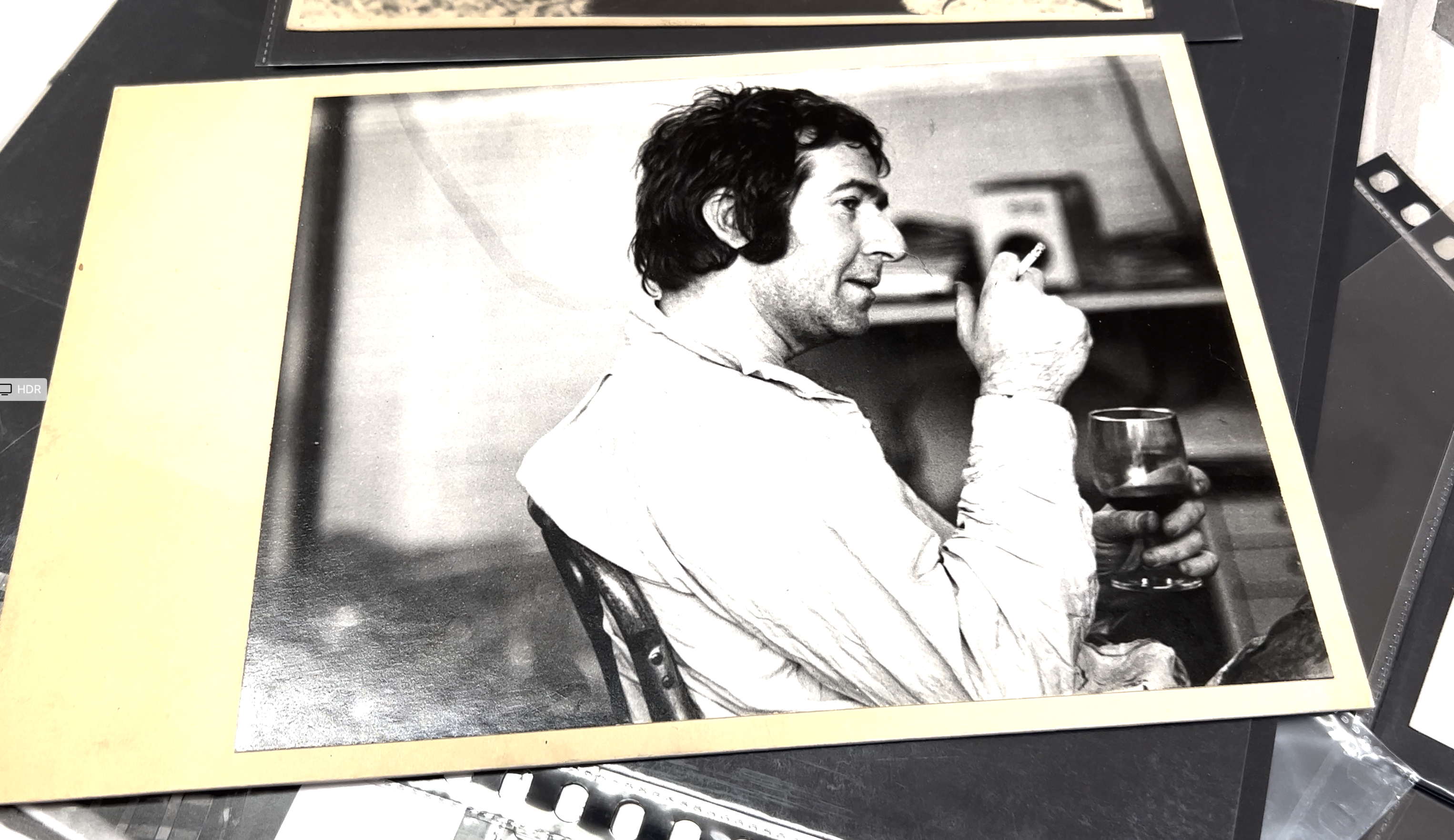
Photo of Michael Goldberg in 222 Bowery studio taken by Goldberg's stepson Lucas Matthiessen in 1966.

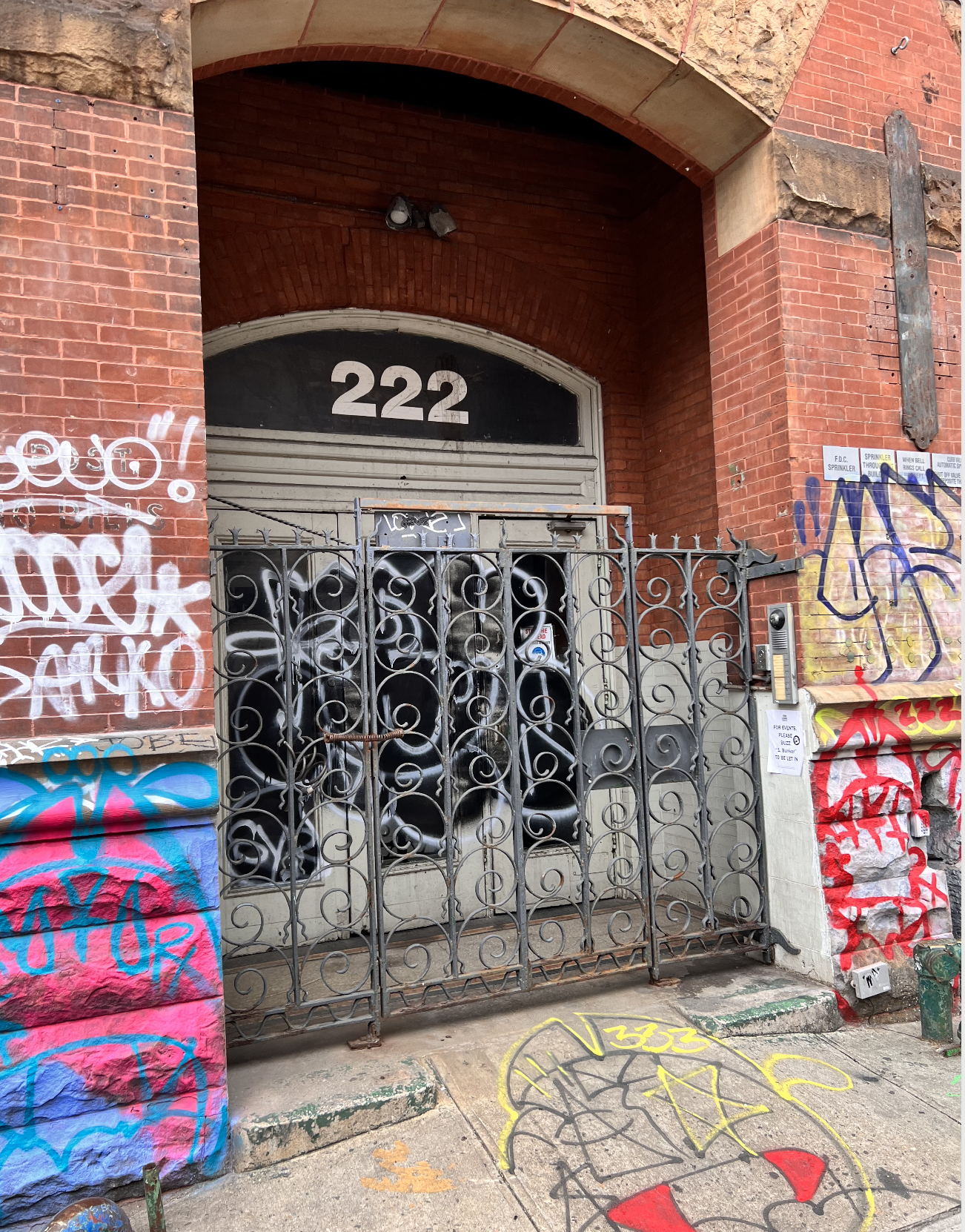
front of 222 Bowery - Michael Goldberg's studio is on the 2nd floor

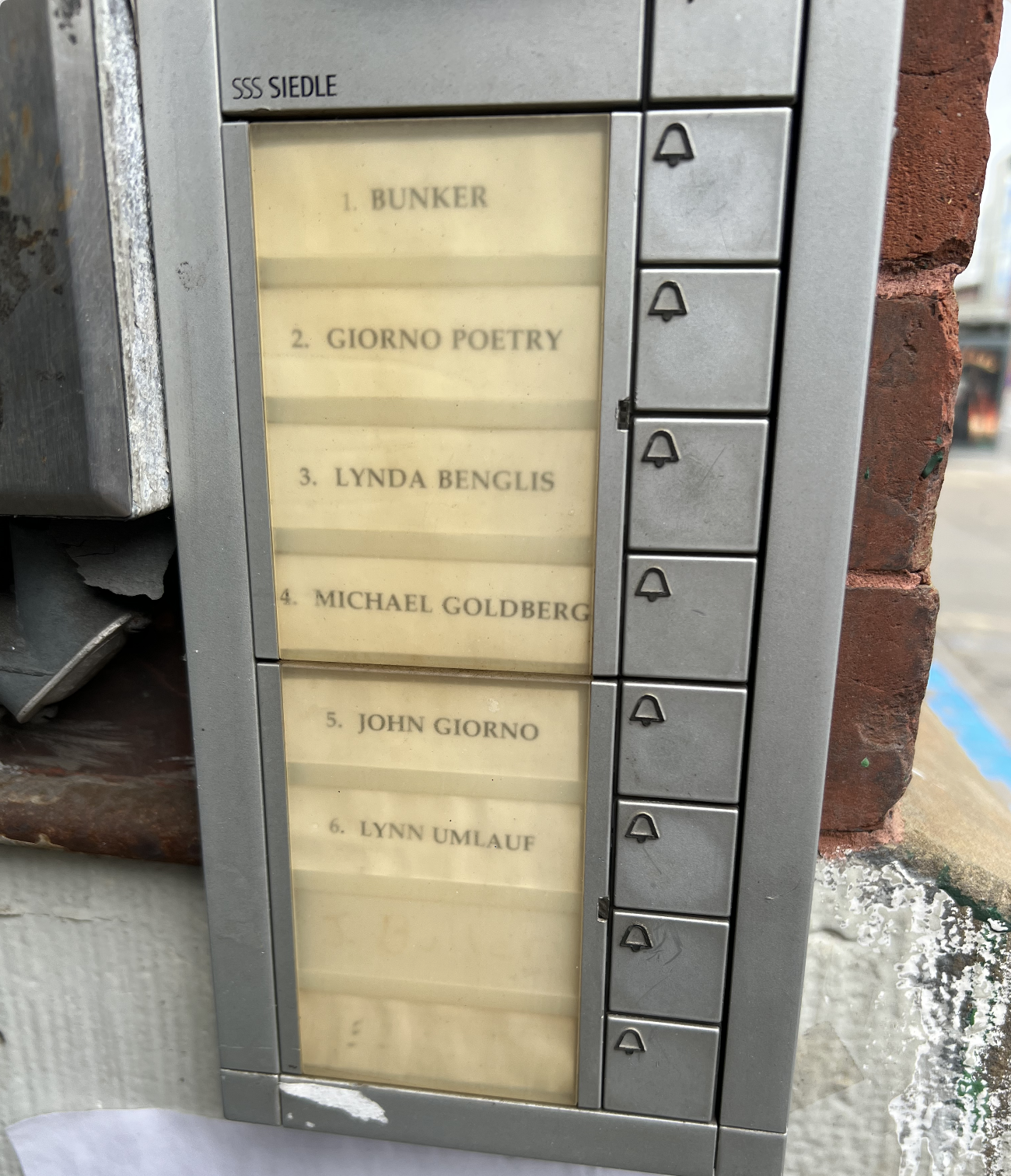
Buzzer of 222 Bowery that includes names of poets and artists: Michael Goldberg, Lynda Benglis, poet John Giorno, artist Lynn Umlauf (wife of Michael Goldberg). The Bunker was home of beat writer William Burroughs.

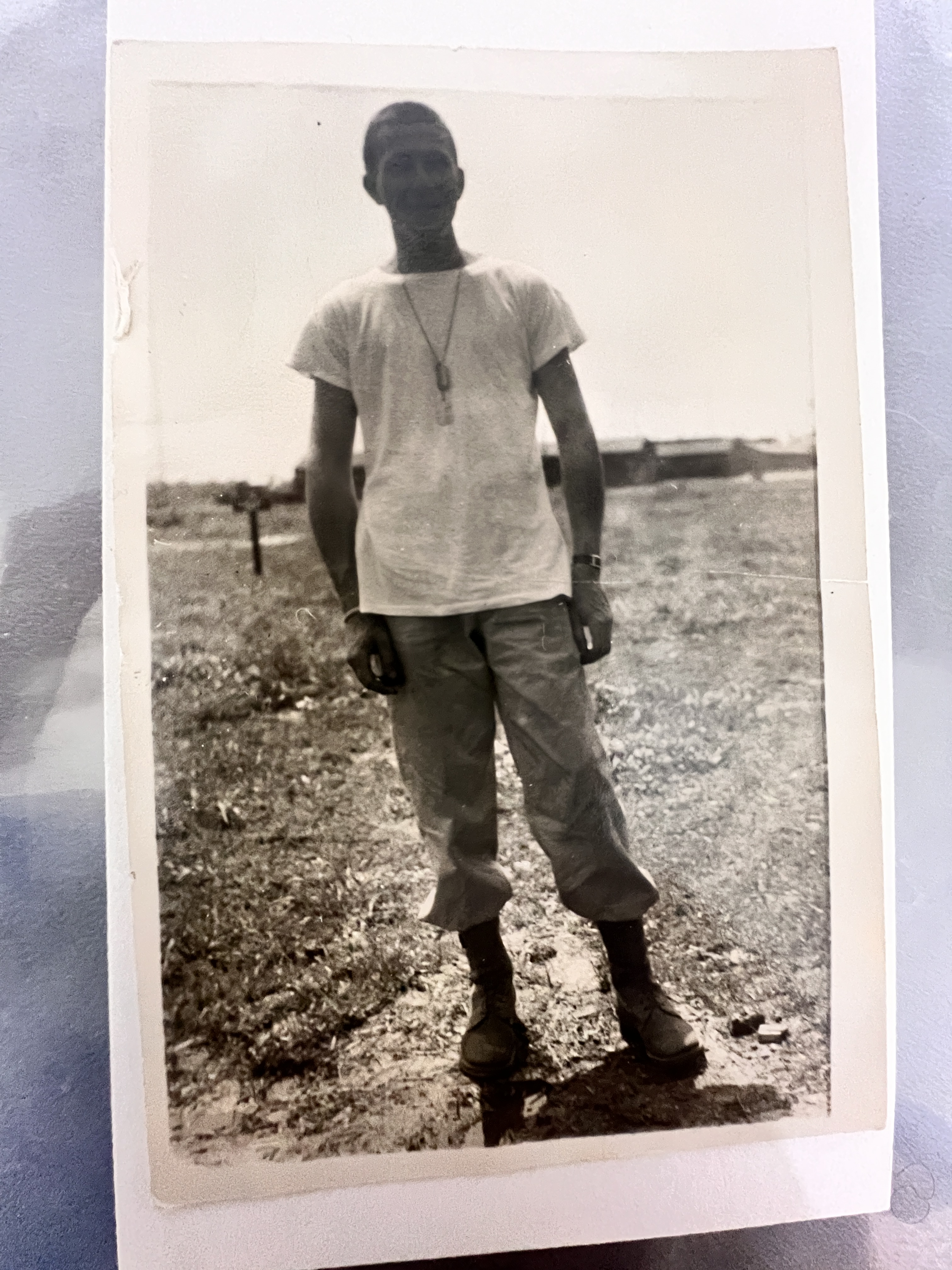
Michael Goldberg approx 18 years old basic training or North Africa around 1942

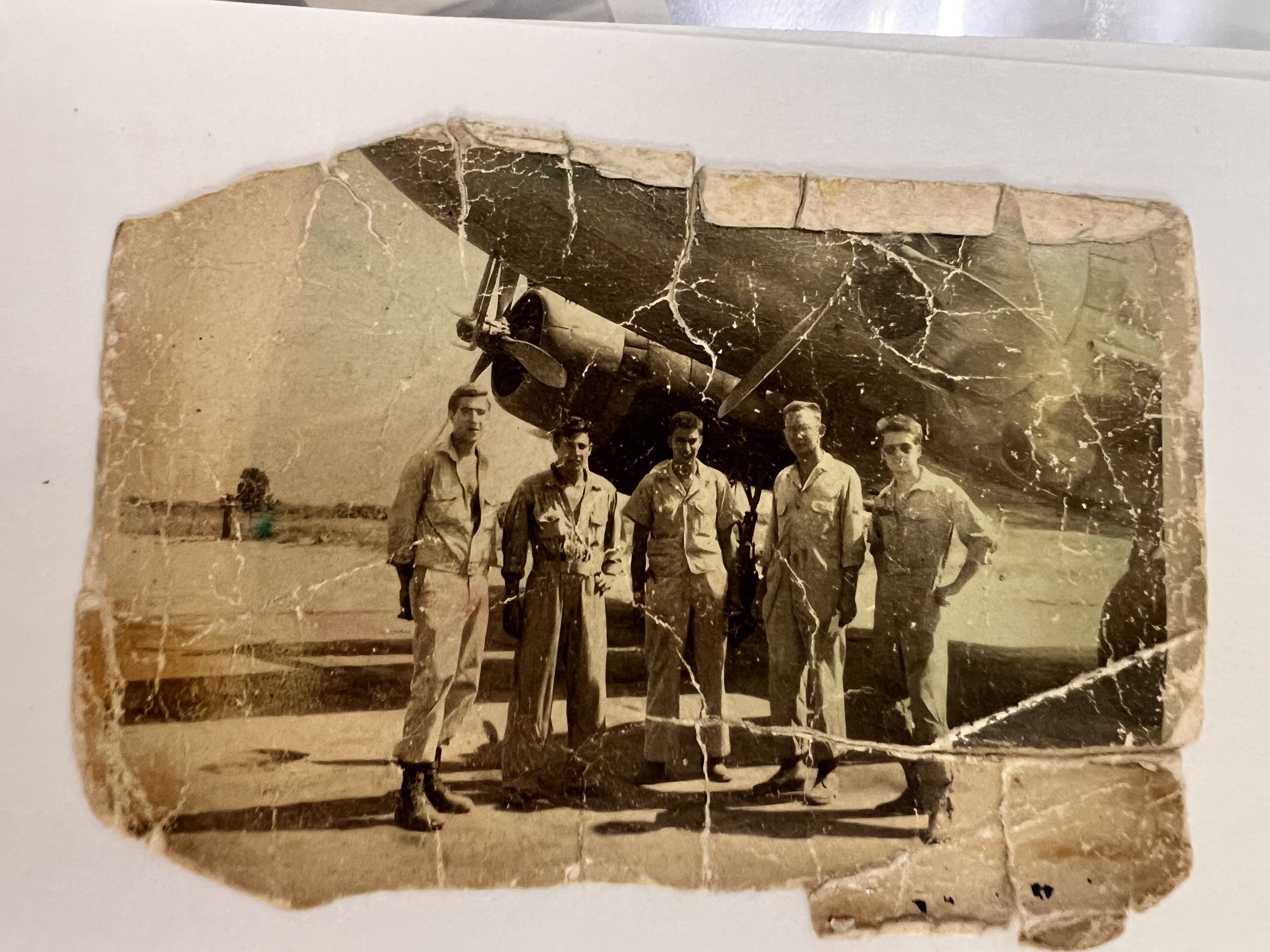
Michael Goldberg during WW2 with Air Crew - Goldberg on the far left

Michael Goldberg (December 24, 1924 – December 31, 2007) was an American abstract expressionist painter and teacher known for his gestural action paintings, abstractions and still-life paintings. A retrospective show, "Abstraction Over Time: The Paintings of Michael Goldberg", was shown at MOCA Jacksonville in Florida from 9/21/13 to 1/5/14. His work was seen in September 2007 in a solo exhibition at Knoedler & Company in New York City, as well as several exhibitions at Manny Silverman Gallery in Los Angeles. Additionally, a survey of Goldberg's work is exhibited at the University Art Museum at California State University, Long Beach since September 2010.

== Biography ==
A veteran of World War II, Goldberg was one of the last few remaining survivors of the New York School; he was sometimes referred to as a member of the so-called "second generation" of Abstract Expressionists, although he began exhibiting his action paintings in important group shows in galleries in New York City in the early 1950s. Goldberg began taking classes at the Art Students League of New York at age 14. In the 1950s he studied painting with Hans Hofmann, and he discussed painting with Willem de Kooning, Lee Krasner, Jackson Pollock, Franz Kline, Mark Rothko and several others of the New York School sometimes at The Eighth Street Club, a regular meeting place of modern artists working in and around Tenth Street in New York and sometimes at the Cedar Bar. He began to exhibit his paintings in New York City during the early 1950s, and some of his abstract expressionist peers included artists like Joan Mitchell, Alfred Leslie, Grace Hartigan, Helen Frankenthaler, Knox Martin, Friedel Dzubas, Norman Bluhm, and Sam Francis among others.

Goldberg came into prominence in the late 1950s, early 1960s just as Color field painting, Hard-edge painting and Pop Art emerged onto centerstage. With the changing of fashions in the art world; his greatest accomplishments as a painter weren't sufficiently recognized; and as many of his generation his work was overlooked for many years. He was known in early 1950's for an affair with the poet and playwright Violet Ranny Lang and is celebrated in her play "Fire Exit," as told in Alison Lurie's memoir V.R. Lang, Poems & Plays, with a Memoir by Alison Lurie. Although by the 1970s and 1980s his work began to achieve recognition and appreciation and he enjoyed a long, successful and a celebrated career as an abstract painter. His work like others of the abstract expressionist generation expressed a painterly integration of Western metaphysics and Eastern philosophy. Throughout his long career and into his mature years, he continued to teach, paint, and exhibit his work. His classes at the School of Visual Arts were well attended by devoted students, and admirers. He lived with his wife and longtime companion, the late artist Lynn Umlauf, who also taught at the School of Visual Arts. He died in Manhattan of a heart attack. He is also survived by his brother, the writer Gerald Jay Goldberg.

== Collections ==
Goldberg's work is in the collections of the Albright-Knox Art Gallery, the Baltimore Museum of Art, the Chrysler Museum of Art, the Walker Art Center, the Museum of Modern Art, the Solomon R. Guggenheim Museum, the Hirshhorn Museum and Sculpture Garden, the Museum of Fine Arts, Houston, the Whitney Museum of American Art, the Muscarelle Museum of Art and many others.

== Books and catalogs ==
- Sandler, Irving H. The New York School: The Painters and Sculptors of the Fifties, New York: Harper & Row, 1978. ISBN 0-06-438505-1
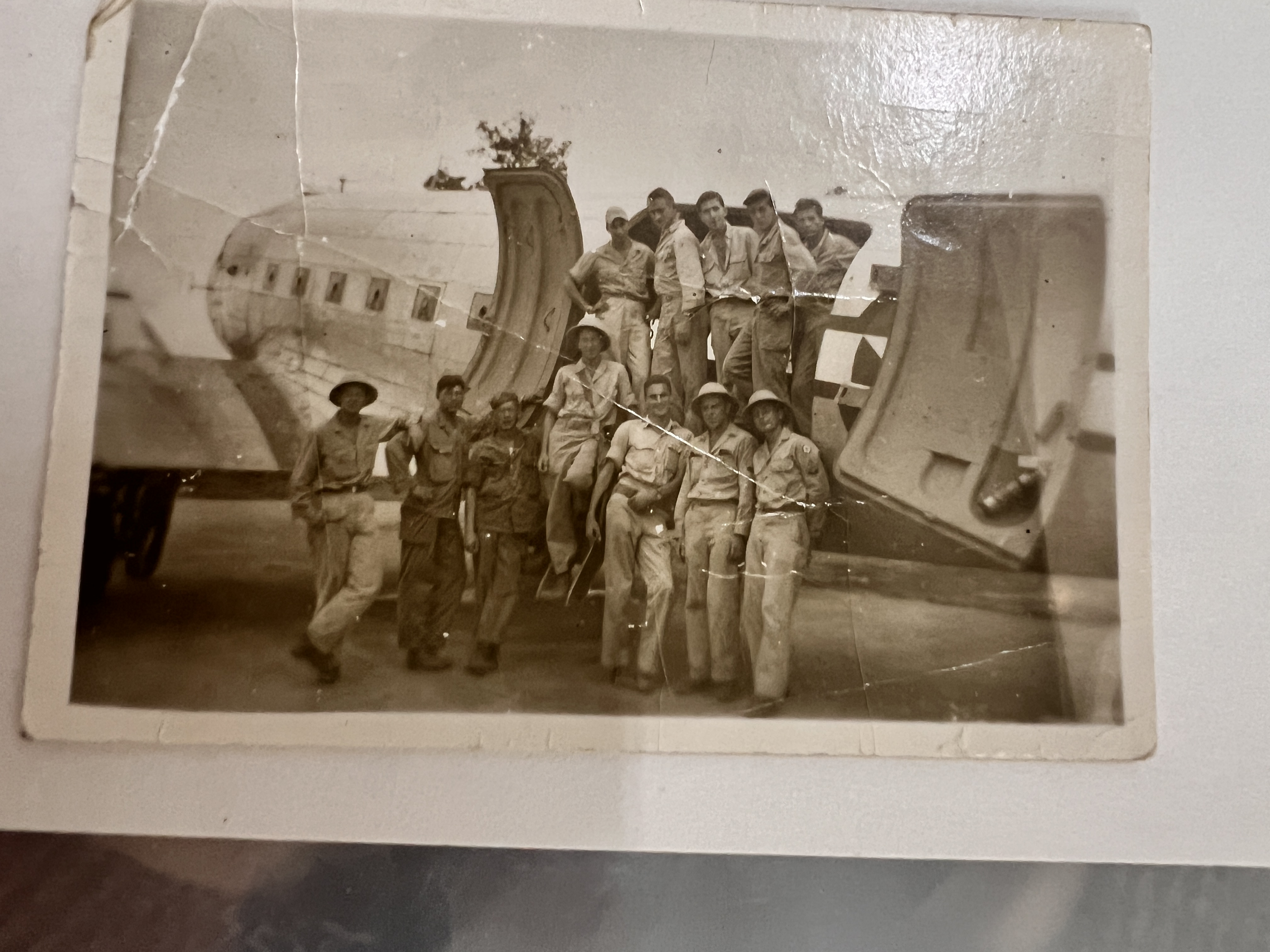
- Michael Goldberg served in Army during WW2, this is Guam 1944-1945
  Schimmel, Paul Action Precision: The New Direction In New York 1955-60, Newport Harbor Museum, 1984. ISBN 0-917493-00-1
- Sandler, Irving H. Abstract Expressionism in the United States, Centro Cultural Arte Contemporaneo, A.C., Mexico, 1996
- Marika Herskovic, American Abstract Expressionism of the 1950s An Illustrated Survey, (New York School Press, 2003.) ISBN 0-9677994-1-4. pp. 138–141
- Marika Herskovic, New York School Abstract Expressionists Artists Choice by Artists, (New York School Press, 2000.) ISBN 0-9677994-0-6. p. 8; p. 16; p. 37; pp. 150–153
- Anfam, David, Perpetual Motion: Michael Goldberg, University Art Museum, College of the Arts, California State University, Long Beach, 2010. ISBN 978-0-936270-55-5
