= Lindsay Pollock =

American journalist

- Education: Barnard College, Columbia University Graduate School of Journalism
- Occupations: Whitney Museum Chief Communications and Content Officer (2018-present) Editor-in-Chief of Art in America Magazine (2011–2017), Arts Writer

Lindsay Pollock is an American art journalist, and was appointed as the Whitney Museum of American Art's Chief Communications and Content Director in 2018.

Pollock was previously Editor-In-Chief of Art in America Magazine from 2011–2017. Pollock also is a journalist and writer blogger specializing in the art market. She has also written on art for Bloomberg News, the New York Sun, Art & Auction, ARTnews, Art Review, and The Art Newspaper.

In 2006, Pollock published The Girl with the Gallery, the only biography of Edith Halpert, an art dealer who founded the Downtown Gallery in 1926 in the Greenwich Village neighborhood of New York City. Halpert helped to launch the careers of artists such as Stuart Davis, Jacob Lawrence, Georgia O'Keeffe, Charles Sheeler, and Ben Shahn.

A graduate of Barnard College and the Columbia University Graduate School of Journalism, Pollock lives in New York City.
