= Art critic =

Person who specializes in evaluating art

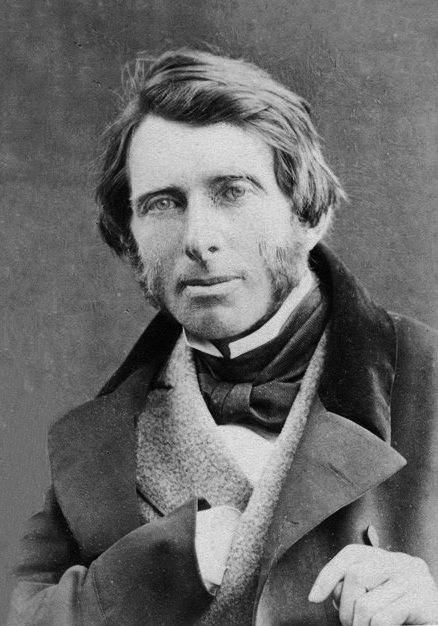
John Ruskin (1819–1900), who Leo Tolstoy described as "one of those rare men who think with their heart." A champion of the work of J. M. W. Turner, Ruskin detested the work of James McNeill Whistler.

An art critic is a person who is specialized in analyzing, interpreting, and evaluating art. Their written critiques or reviews contribute to art criticism and they are published in newspapers, magazines, books, exhibition brochures, and catalogues and on websites. Some of today's art critics use art blogs and other online platforms in order to connect with a wider audience and expand debate.

== Opinions ==
Differently from art history, there is not commonly an institutionalized training for art critics. Art critics come from different backgrounds and they may or may not be university trained. Professional art critics are expected to have a keen eye for art and a thorough knowledge of art history. Typically the art critic views art at exhibitions, galleries, museums or artists' studios and they can be members of the International Association of Art Critics which has national sections. Very rarely art critics earn their living from writing criticism.

The opinions of art critics have the potential to stir debate on art-related topics. Due to this the viewpoints of art critics writing for art publications and newspapers adds to public discourse concerning art and culture. Art collectors and patrons often rely on the advice of such critics as a way to enhance their appreciation of the art they are viewing. Many now-famous and celebrated artists were not recognized by the art critics of their time, often because their art was in a style not yet understood or favored. Conversely, some critics have become particularly important helping to explain and promote new art movements – Roger Fry with the Post-Impressionist movement and Lawrence Alloway with pop art as examples.

== Controversies ==
According to James Elkins there is a distinction between art criticism and art history based on institutional, contextual, and commercial criteria; the history of art criticism is taught in universities, but the practice of art criticism is excluded institutionally from academia. An experience-related article is Agnieszka Gratza. Always according to James Elkins in smaller and developing countries, newspaper art criticism normally serves as art history. James Elkins's perspective portraits his personal link to art history and art historians and in What happened to art criticism he furthermore highlights the gap between art historians and art critics by suggesting that the first rarely cite the second as a source and that the second miss an academic discipline to refer to.

== Gallery ==
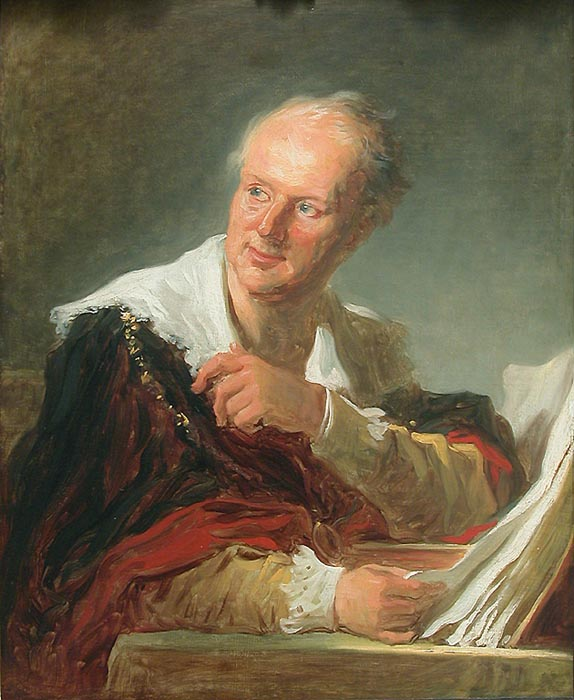
Jean-Honoré Fragonard, Portrait of Denis Diderot, 1769, Louvre, Paris. His art criticism was highly influential. His Essais sur la peinture was described by Johann Wolfgang von Goethe, as "a magnificent work, which speaks even more helpfully to the poet than to the painter, though to the painter too it is as a blazing torch." Diderot's favorite painter was Jean-Baptiste Greuze.

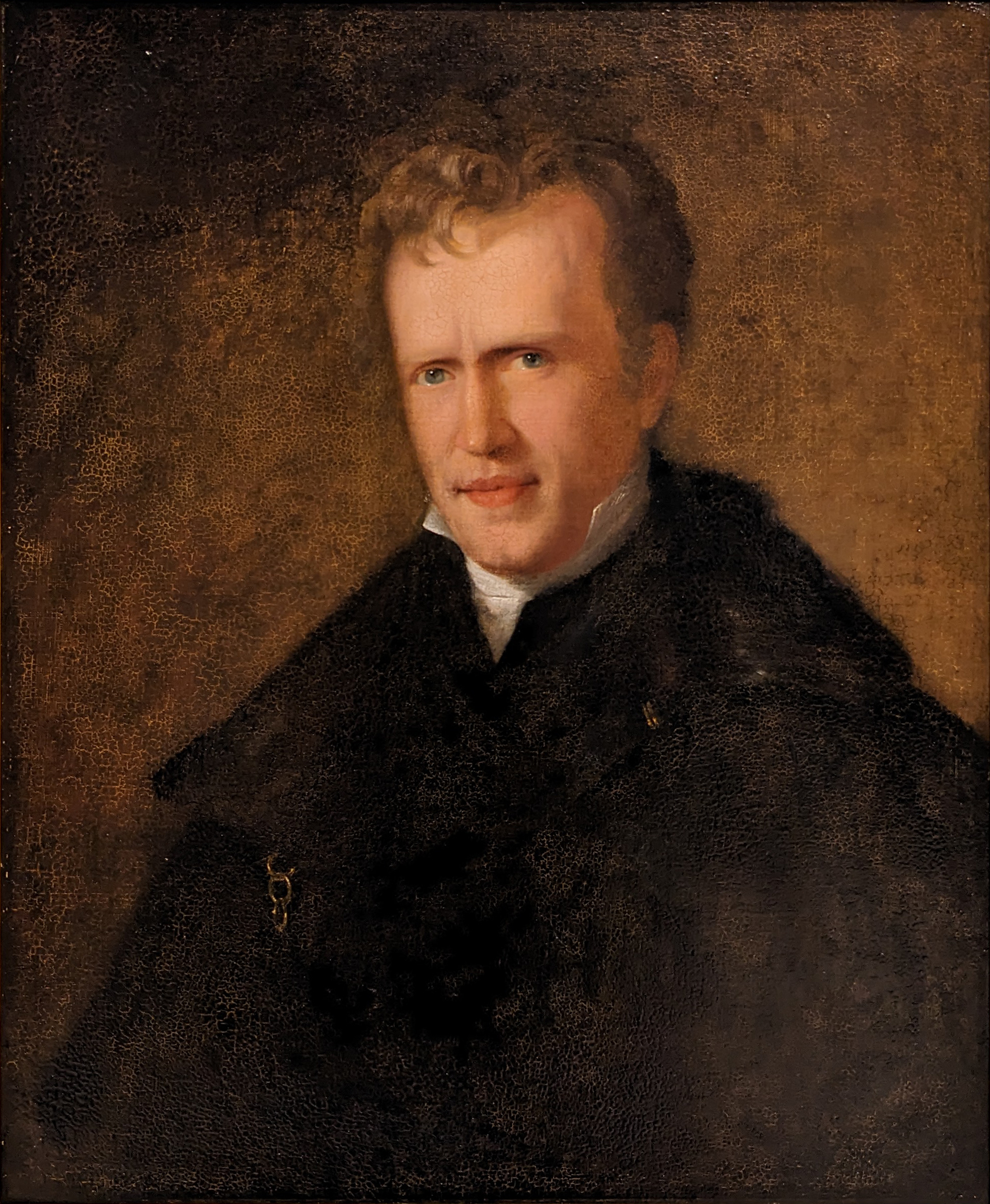
Portrait of John Neal by Sarah Miriam Peale, 1823. Neal is regarded as the first American art critic and was also an influential writer and literary critic.

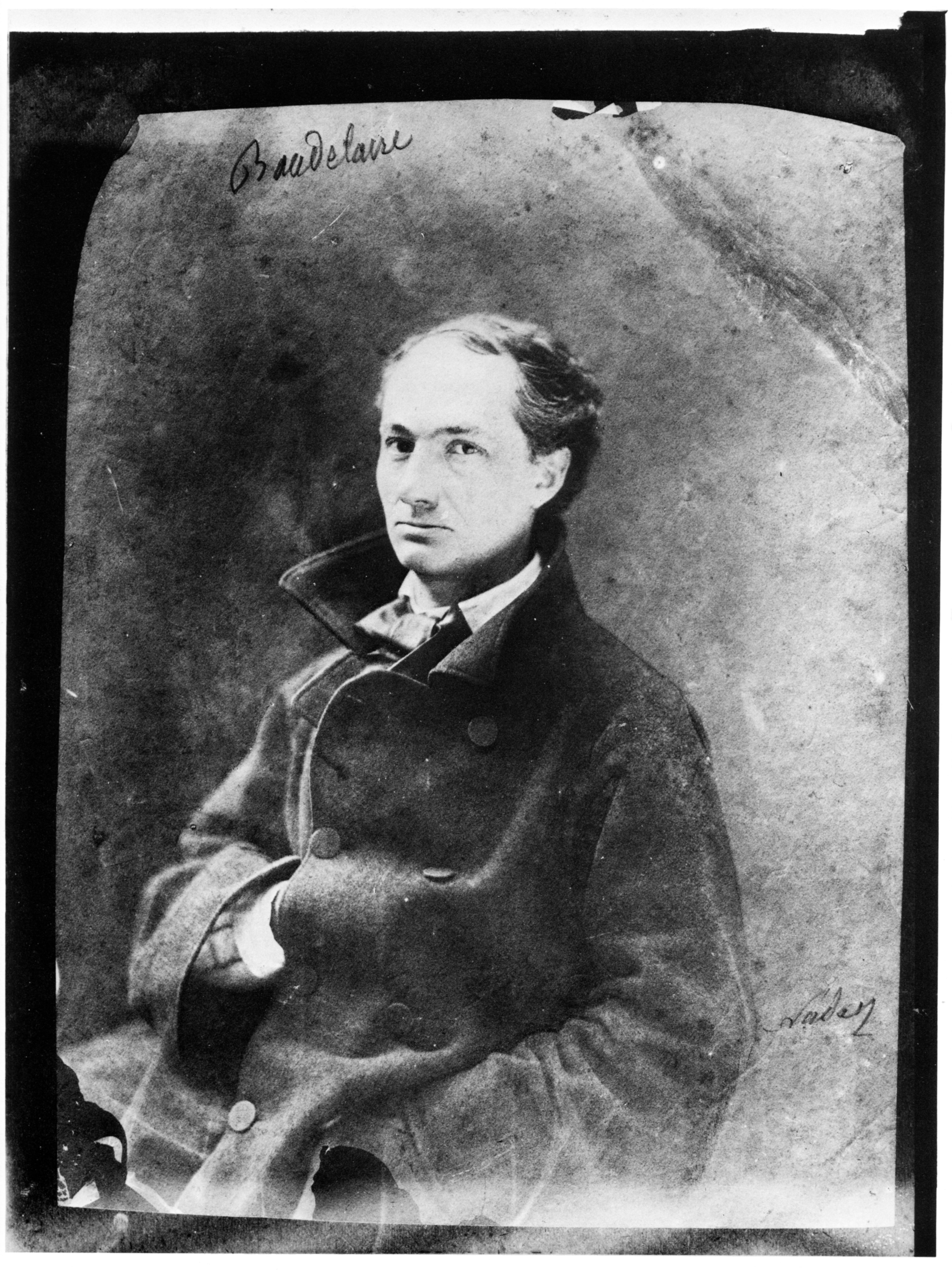
Charles Baudelaire 1855, Photo by Nadar. Baudelaire is associated with the Decadent movement. His book of poetry Les Fleurs du mal is acknowledged as a classic of French literature

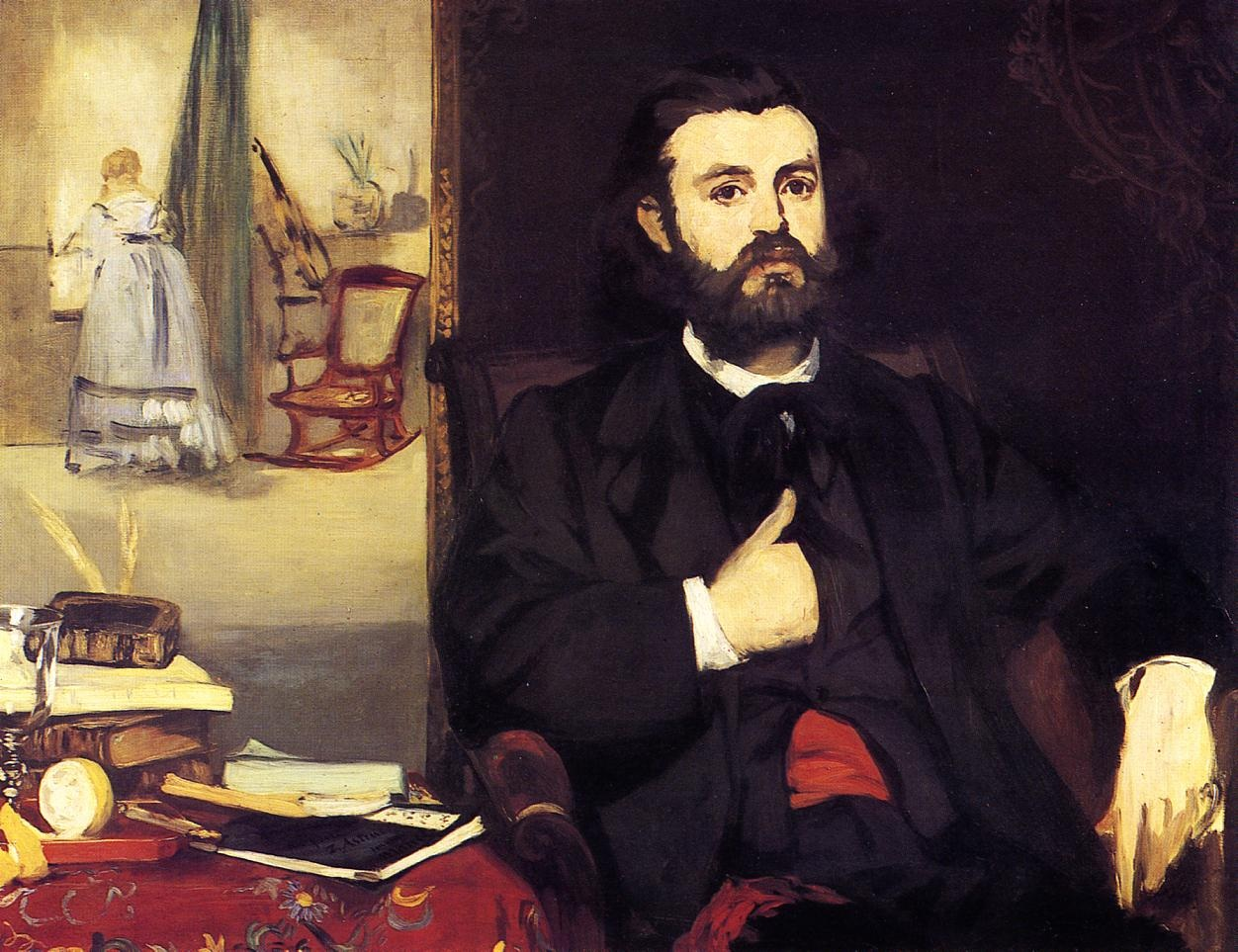
Édouard Manet, Portrait of Zacharie Astruc 1866, Kunsthalle Bremen. He was a strong defender of Gustave Courbet, and was one of the first to recognize the talent of Édouard Manet. He also defended Claude Monet, James McNeill Whistler, Carolus-Duran, Fantin-Latour, and Alphonse Legros.

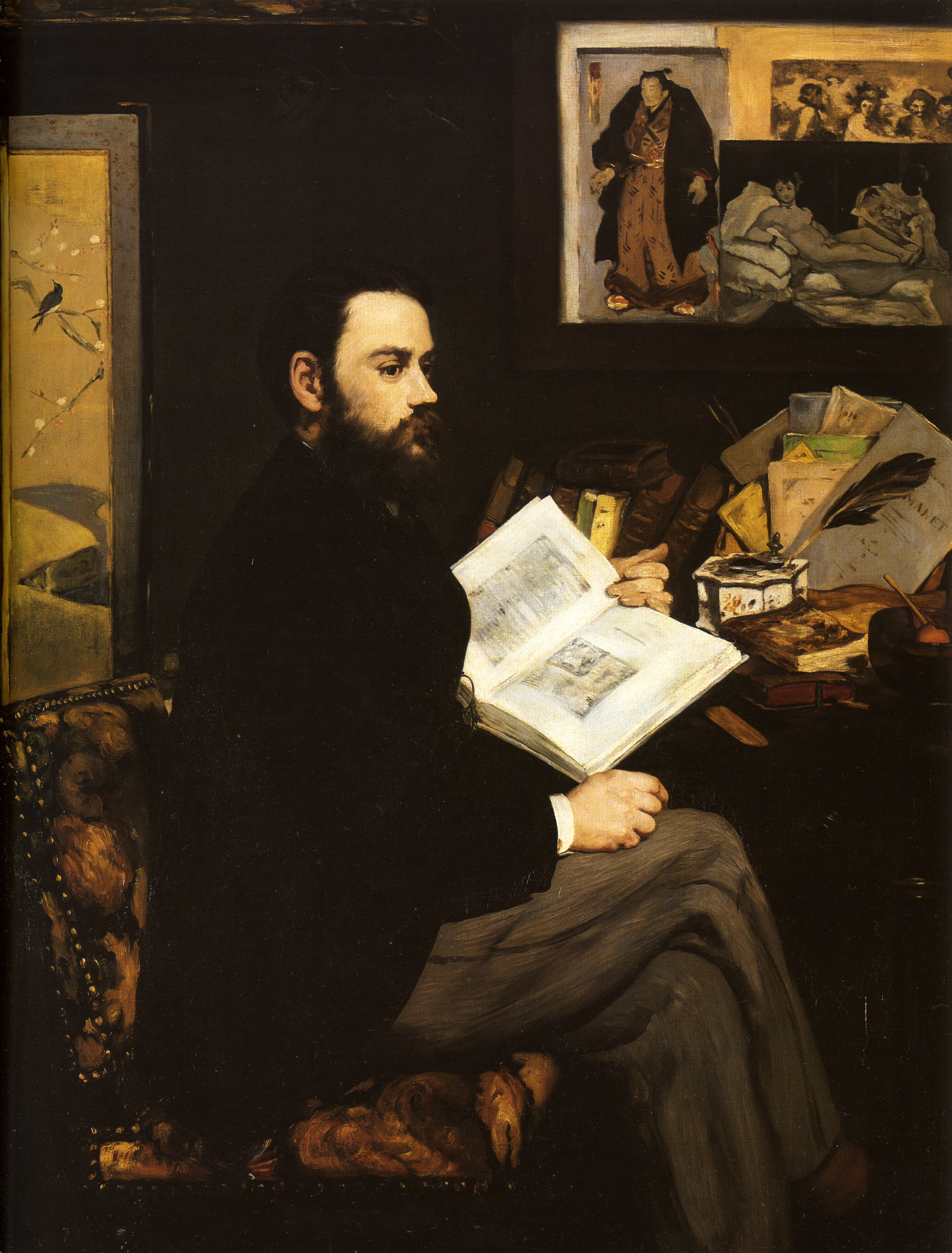
Édouard Manet, Portrait of Émile Zola, 1868, Musée d'Orsay. Émile Zola (1840-1902) was an influential French writer, and art critic. He was a major figure in the exoneration of the falsely accused and convicted army officer Alfred Dreyfus.

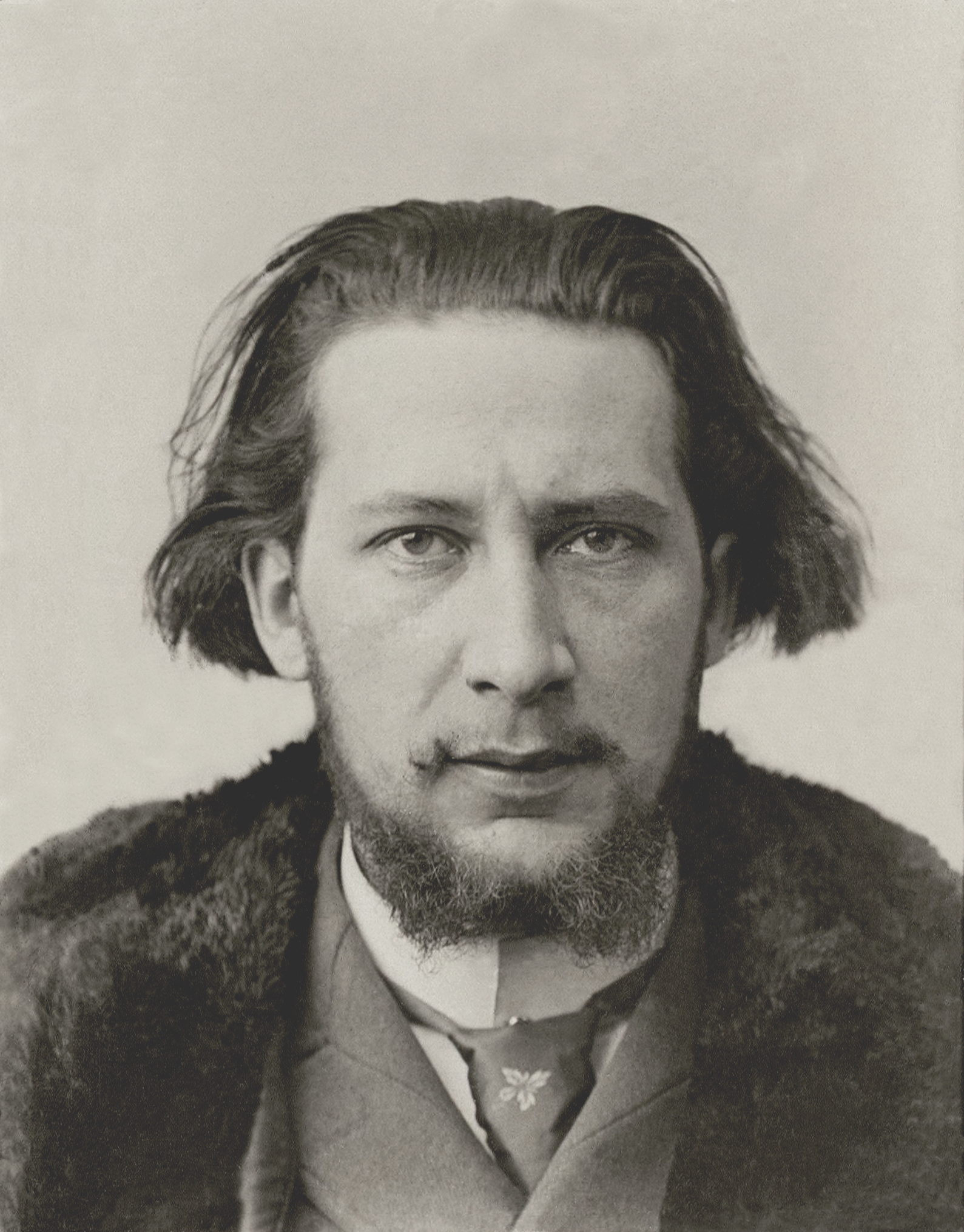
Albert Aurier, c. 1890, Wrote about Vincent van Gogh, and Paul Gauguin.

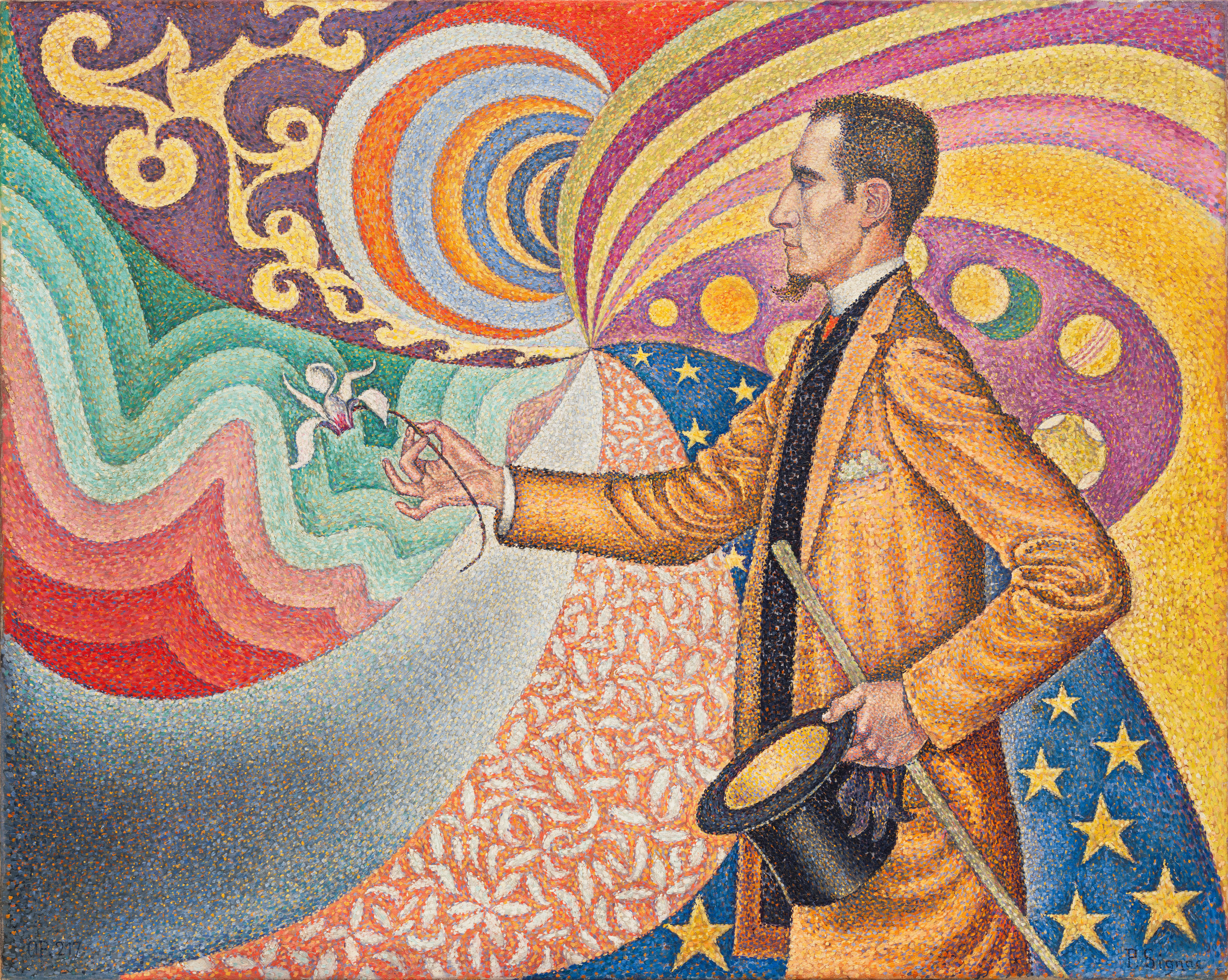
Paul Signac, Félix Fénéon, 1890. A French anarchist and art critic in Paris during the late 1800s. He coined the term "Neo-impressionism" in 1886.

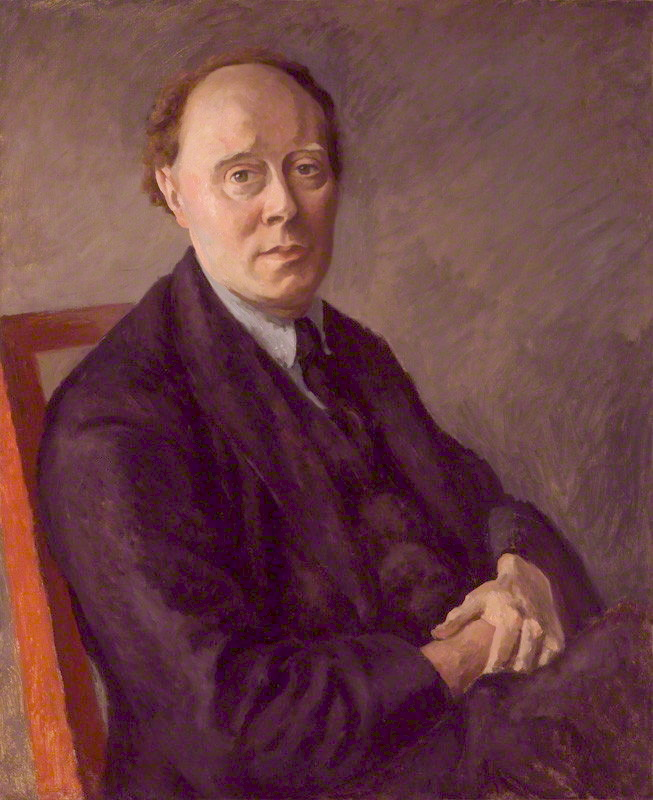
Portrait of Clive Bell (1881-1964), by Roger Fry (1924 c.)

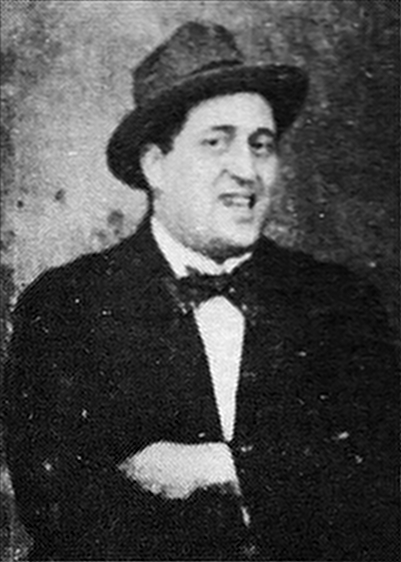
Guillaume Apollinaire (1880–1918), 1914, French poet, writer and art critic he is credited with coining the word surrealism

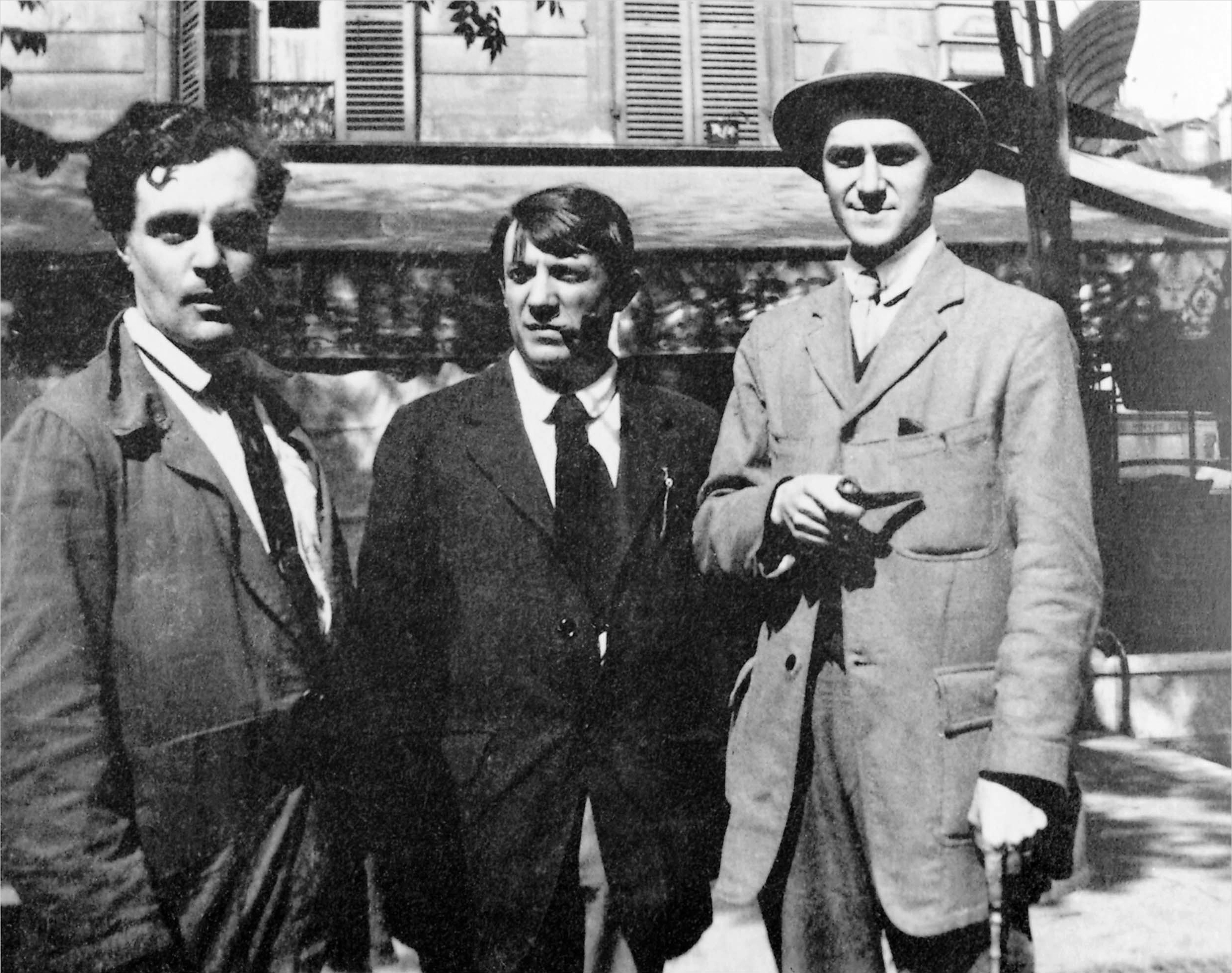
André Salmon, Modigliani, and Pablo Picasso in Montparnasse (1916), photographed by Jean Cocteau

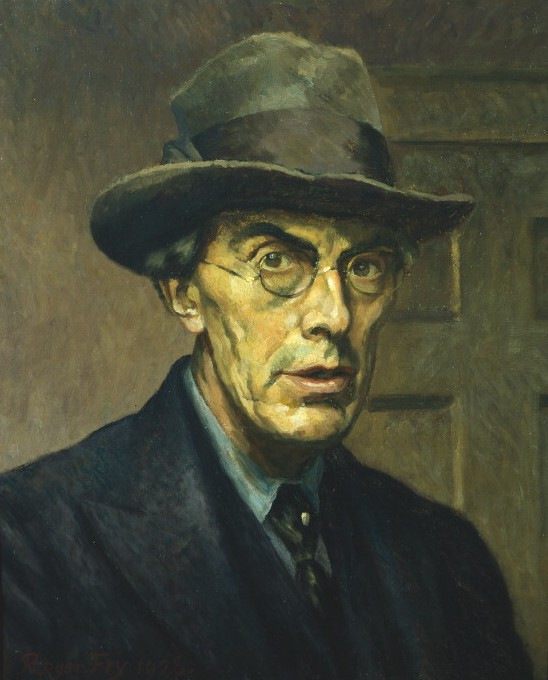
Roger Fry Self-portrait, 1928. He was described by Kenneth Clark as "incomparably the greatest influence on taste since Ruskin... In so far as taste can be changed by one man, it was changed by Roger Fry".

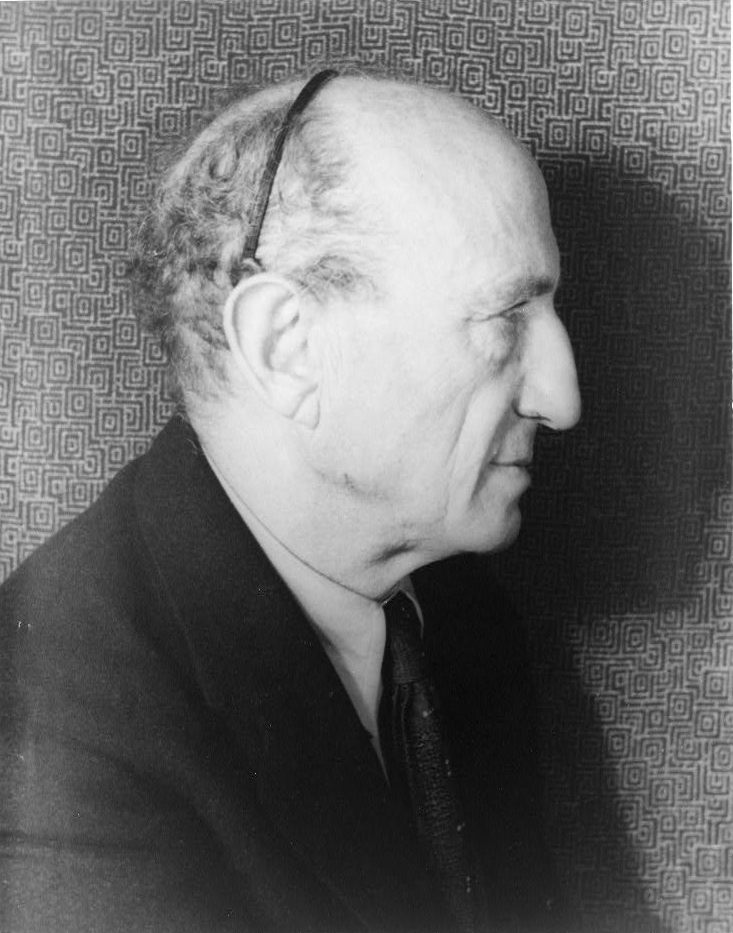
Leo Stein (1872–1947), art collector/critic, elder brother of Gertrude Stein. Photo by Carl Van Vechten, November 9, 1937

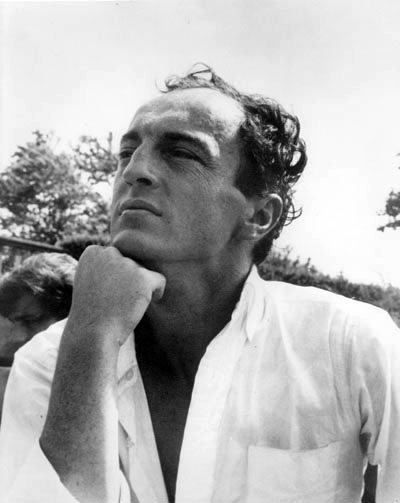
Frank O'Hara (1926-1966), Larry Rivers, delivered one of the eulogies, along with Bill Berkson, Edwin Denby, and René d'Harnoncourt.

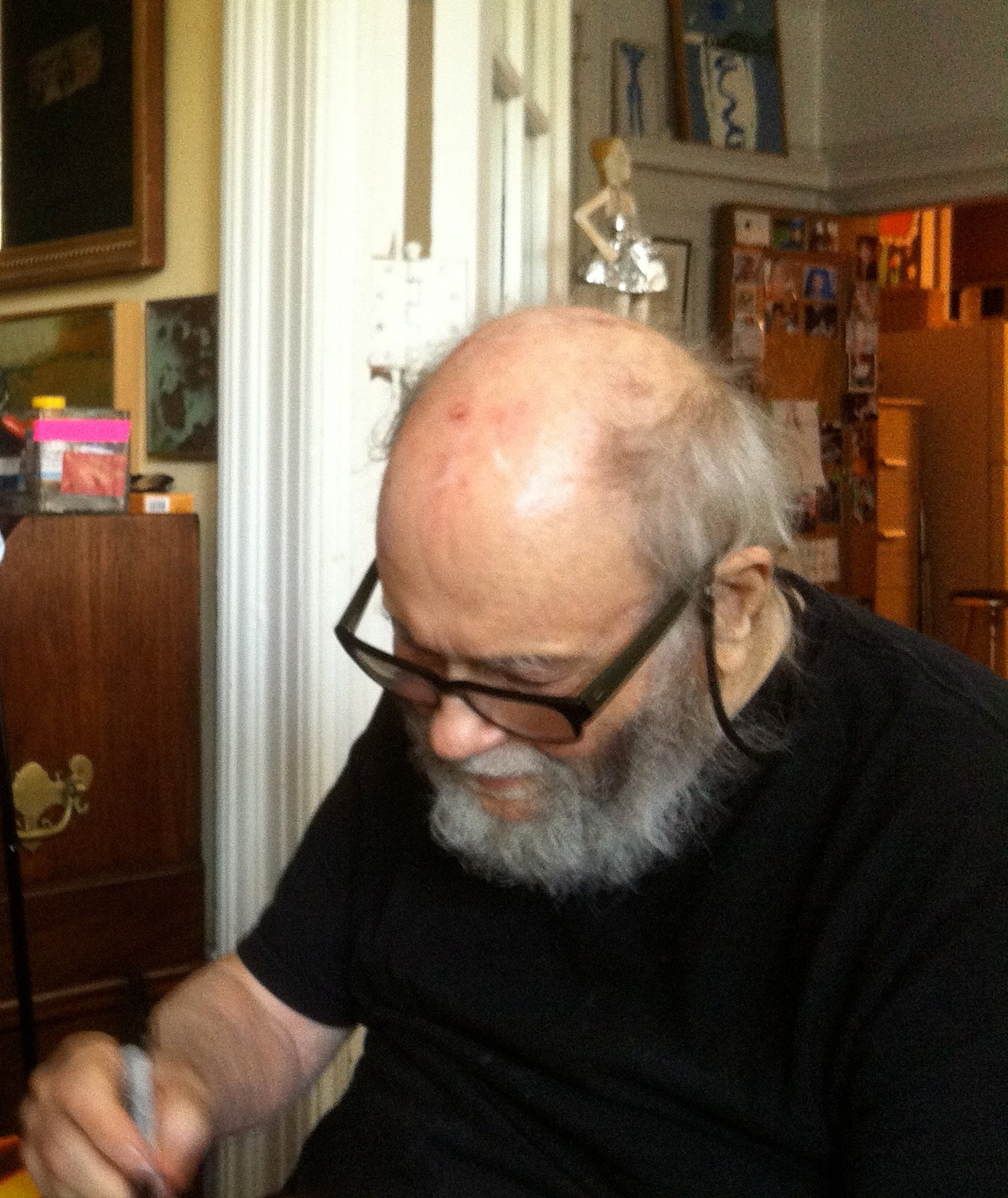
Arthur Danto, (1924-2013), Danto laid the groundwork for an institutional definition of art

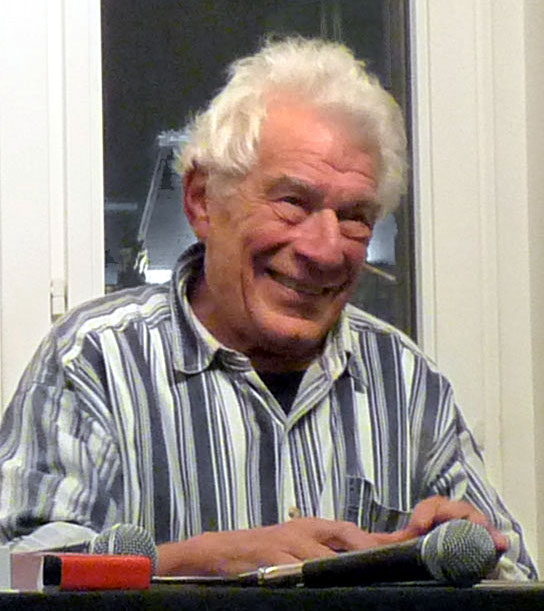
John Berger, (1926-2017),

== Notable art critics ==
- Christopher Allen
- Lawrence Alloway
- Guillaume Apollinaire
- Henriette Arasse
- Zacharie Astruc
- Albert Aurier
- Charles Baudelaire
- Michael Baxandall
- Sister Wendy Beckett
- Clive Bell
- Andrew Berardini
- Bernard Berenson
- John Berger
- Vasily Botkin
- John Canaday
- Champfleury
- Kenneth Clark
- T. J. Clark
- Robert Coates
- Clarence Cook
- Douglas Cooper
- Royal Cortissoz
- Thomas Craven
- Arthur Danto
- G. Roger Denson
- Sergei Diaghilev
- Denis Diderot
- John Elderfield
- James Elkins
- Ticio Escobar
- Félix Fénéon
- Hal Foster
- Peter Frank
- Michael Fried
- B. H. Friedman
- Roger Fry
- Peter Fuller
- Théophile Gautier
- Stepan Gedeonov
- Gustave Geffroy
- Clement Greenberg
- Dmitry Grigorovich
- Boris Groys
- Ichirō Hariu
- Dave Hickey
- Robert Hughes
- Édouard Jaguer
- Michael Kimmelman
- Hilton Kramer
- Rosalind E. Krauss
- R. Siva Kumar
- Donald Kuspit
- Julien Leclercq
- Louis Leroy
- Lucy R. Lippard
- Giovanni Lista
- George Loukomski
- Sergey Makovsky
- Nancy Marmer
- Camille Mauclair
- Octave Mirbeau
- Robert C. Morgan
- Suzanne Muchnic
- John Neal
- Linda Nochlin
- Frank O'Hara
- Saul Ostrow
- Jed Perl
- Adrian Prakhov
- Griselda Pollock
- Nikolay Punin
- Arlene Raven
- Herbert Read
- Pierre Restany
- John Rewald
- Rainer Maria Rilke
- Daniel Robbins
- Barbara Rose
- Harold Rosenberg
- Robert Rosenblum
- John Ruskin
- John Russell
- Frank Rutter
- André Salmon
- Jerry Saltz
- Irving Sandler
- Meyer Schapiro
- Peter Schjeldahl
- Brian Sewell
- Roberta Smith
- Rafael Squirru
- Vladimir Stasov
- Leo Stein
- Leo Steinberg
- Aleksey Suvorin
- Michel Tapié
- Théophile Thoré-Bürger
- Éric Troncy
- Tristan Tzara
- Kirk Varnedoe
- Louis Vauxcelles
- Boris Vipper
- Karen Wilkin
- Émile Zola
