= Daniel Arasse =

French art historian

Daniel Dominique Arasse (French: [aʁas]; 5 November 1944, Algiers – 14 December 2003, Paris) was a French art historian who specialised in the Renaissance and Italian art. He was the son of art critic, Henriette Arasse.

His publication, Le Détail, Pour une histoire rapprochée de la peinture (1992) won the Charles-Blanc Prize in 1993. Another book La Guillotine et L'imaginaire de la Terreur (1987), was translated into English as The Guillotine and the Terror (1989).

== Biography ==
Daniel Arasse, born on November 5, 1944 in Algiers, is the son of Raymond and Henriette Arasse.

Daniel Arasse passed the École normale supérieure (Paris) in 1965, then the agrégation de lettres classiques, and began a thesis at the Sorbonne (building) with André Chastel on Italian Renaissance art, focusing on Bernardino of Siena. Following an incident in Florence in July 1976, recounted in Histoires de peintures (“The Stolen Thesis”), he changed director and subject, working under Louis Marin (philosopher) at the School for Advanced Studies in the Social Sciences (EHESS).

From 1969 to 1993, Daniel Arasse taught the history of modern art, from the 15th to the 19th century, at the Paris-Sorbonne University (for two years) and then at the Paris 1 Panthéon-Sorbonne University.

From 1971 to 1973, he was a member of the École française de Rome, which he left because of differences with director Georges Vallet.

From 1982 to 1989, he directed the Institut français de Florence, where he created the France Cinéma festival.

From 1993, he was director of studies at EHESS, where he was elected on the basis of merit, even though he had never defended his thesis.
