= George Loukomski =

Russian artist, art critic and art historian

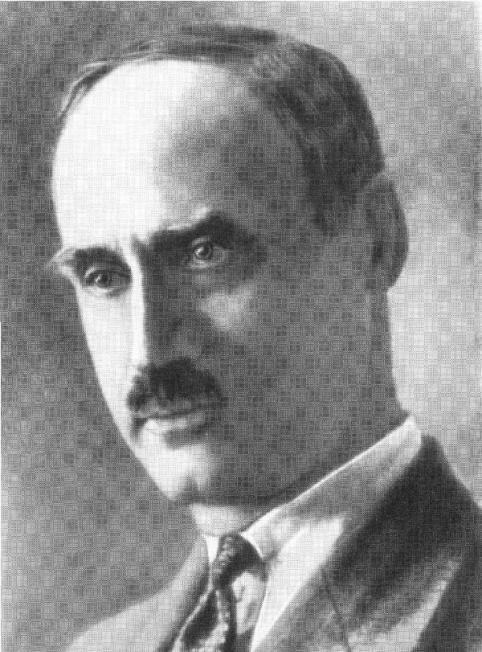
George Loukomski.

George Kreskentevich Loukomski (Russian: Гео́ргий Креске́нтьевич Луко́мский; 1884 in Kaluga – 1952 in Nice) was an artist, art critic and art historian from the Russian Empire.

== Biography ==
Born in 1884 in Kaluga, Russian Empire, into an old noble family, Loukomski trained in the architectural department of the Kazan Art School (1901–1903), then in the Imperial Academy of Arts in St. Petersburg. He gained his reputation in the field of art criticism and art history, working in Russian journals as well as being a talented painter.

After the Russian Revolution of 1917 he emigrated to Western Europe, continuing his work of art historian and artist mainly of architectural works.

== Works ==
- Saint Petersburg. Munchen 1923
- L'Oeuvre d'Andrea Palladio: Les Villas des Doges de Venise. Paris, 1927.
- Les fresques de Paul Véronèse et de ses disciples. Paris, Éditions Marcel Seheur, 1928.
- La vie et les moeurs en Russie. Paris, 1928.
- Kiev, Ville Sainte de Russie. Paris, J. Danguin, 1929.
- Les Demeures des Tsars: Les Palais des Empereurs de Toutes les Russies. Paris, Editions Nilsson 1929.
- l'Architecture religieuse Russe du XIe siècle au XVIIe siècle. Paris, E. Leroux, 1929.
- Art Étrusque. Étude illustrée sur la peinture murale de Corneto-Tarquinia. Paris, 1930.
- Jules Roman. Sa vie, son oeuvre. 1932.
- Catalogue of exhibition of coloured drawings by Prince George Loukomski. Fine Art Society. 1939.
- History of Modern Russian Painting (1840 - 1940). London, Hutchinson, 1940.
- The Face of Russia. London, Hutchinson. 1942.
- Charles Cameron (1740-1812). London, Nicholson & Watson, 1943.
- Jewish Art in European Synagogues. London, 1947.
- The Palace of Charles V at Granada. The Burlington Magazine for Connoisseurs, Vol. 84, No. 494 (May, 1944), pp. 119–124
