= Nancy Marmer =

Nancy Marmer is a writer, art critic and editor who lives in New York City.

From 1979 through 1998, Marmer was an editor at Art in America magazine—first as a senior and executive editor (1979–1982), then as managing editor and book review editor (1983–1997) and contributing editor (1998–2008). She was West Coast editor of Artforum, Los Angeles Correspondent for Art International, a founding editor of Critique: Studies in Modern Fiction and a managing editor of Faulkner Studies. She has taught at the Mellon Seminar, Rhode Island School of Design, the Visual Arts Department of the University of California, San Diego, and the English Department of the University of Minnesota.

Called one of "the earliest critics who attempted serious explorations of modern art in California" and a critic of Los Angeles avant-garde art, Marmer has written about numerous California artists, among them Ed Ruscha, Richard Diebenkorn, James Turrell, Ron Davis, Ed Moses, and Alexis Smith. She is author of "Pop Art in California," a survey of the movement on the West Coast. She has also written about the relationship between art and California politics, including "a detailed outline of the effects of Proposition 13 on the arts." Her art criticism and book reviews have been published in Art in America, Artforum, Art International, Art News, New West, the Los Angeles Times, and Art Press (France).

Marmer has often written about French artists such as Christian Boltanski, and about the role of politics in French culture. In 1977, she covered the opening of France's Beaubourg Museum in the Centre Georges Pompidou, and has written articles about the role of the French ministry of culture and the French art world.

Marmer is co-editor of an anthology of literary criticism, The Modern Critical Spectrum.

Marmer was married to the novelist Gerald Jay Goldberg, a professor emeritus at the University of California, Los Angeles. She has one son, Rob Goldberg, a former film critic for the Wall Street Journal, who is a producer and writer of documentary films.

She has received a National Endowment for the Arts Fellowship in Art Criticism, a Samuel Kress Foundation Award in Art History, the University of Minnesota English Department Prize, and is a member of the Sigma chapter of Phi Beta Kappa.

Marmer currently writes fiction. She has completed one novel and is at work on a second. Since 2008, she has had a blog at Exegette.blogspot.com
