= Art in America =

American art magazine

- Cover of the Summer 2023 issue
- Editor: Sarah Douglas
- Categories: Visual art
- Frequency: Quarterly
- Circulation: 25,599 (2018)
- Founded: 1913; 113 years ago
- Company: Penske Media Corporation
- Country: United States
- Based in: New York City
- Language: English
- Website: artnews.com/c/art-in-america/
- ISSN: 0004-3214
- OCLC: 1514286

Art in America (A.i.A.) is an illustrated quarterly, international magazine concentrating on the contemporary art world in the United States, including profiles of artists and genres, updates about art movements, show reviews and event schedules. It is designed for collectors, artists, art dealers, art professionals and other readers interested in the art world.

Previously a monthly publication, the magazine scaled back to quarterly issues in the 2020s after ownership changes and a merger with the publication ARTnews. Articles from Art in America are published online on the ARTnews website.

== History ==
=== 1913–1940 Founding and early history ===
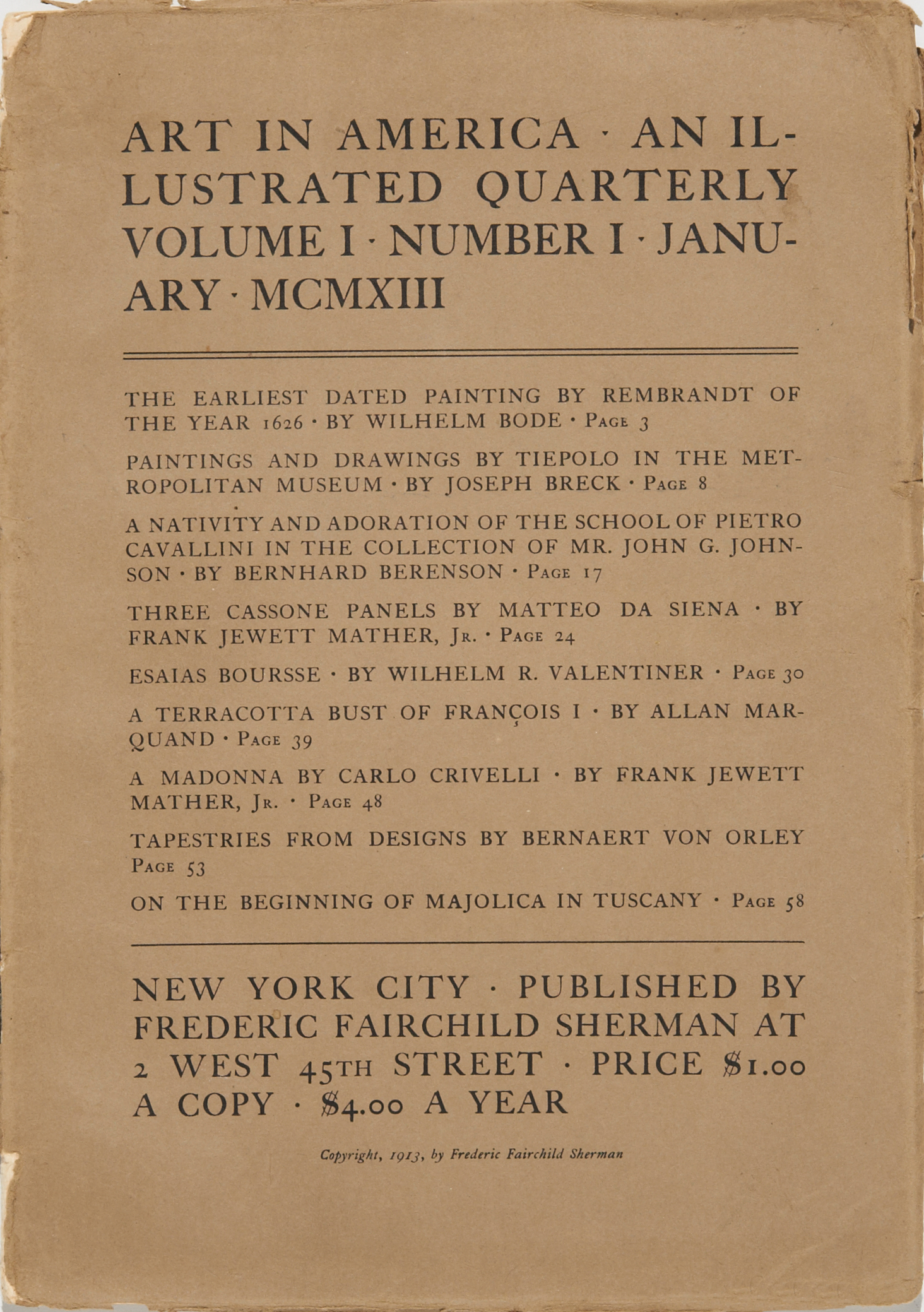
Volume 1, Issue 1 (January 1913)

Art in America was founded in 1913 in New York City as a quarterly magazine by Frederic Fairchild Sherman, who named Renaissance scholar Wilhelm Valentiner the first editor of the publication. The magazine began publishing one month before the 1913 Armory Show took place in New York, one of the first significant exhibitions of modernist and avant-garde artists in the United States, including both European and American artists. The magazine primarily focused on more traditional European art early in its history. Sherman took over from Valentiner as editor in 1917. He eventually hired Jean Lipman as assistant editor in the early 1930s. Between 1921 and 1939 the magazine was published under the title Art in America and Elsewhere.

=== 1940–1957: Jean Lipman ownership ===
Sherman died in 1940 after 27 years as Art in America's publisher. At the time of his death, the magazine's circulation had fallen to less than 200. Lipman became editor and owner of the publication in 1940, with her husband serving as its business manager. The magazine was published from their home in Cannondale, Connecticut.

=== 1957–1984: Lee A. Ault ownership, sale to Whitney Communications ===
Publisher Lee A. Ault purchased the magazine along with several other investors in 1957. In the late 1950s, the magazine began expanding its breadth of criticism and reviews, after having generally avoided covering recent artistic movements like abstract expressionism. Ault's investment also allowed the magazine to grow, publishing in hardcover, and circulation reached 18,000 in 1962. Ault served as Art in America's president and publisher until 1969, when the magazine was purchased by Whitney Communications Corporation, owned by venture capitalist and philanthropist John Hay Whitney.

Lipman left the magazine in 1970 to lead the Whitney Museum's publications department. Brian O'Doherty, a former critic at The New York Times, was named editor after Lipman. O'Doherty became known for publishing criticism under pseudonyms, sometimes of a different gender. Elizabeth C. Baker, known as Betsy, was appointed editor in 1974. Art in America increased its output from six issues a year to ten a year in 1979; the publication claimed a circulation of 45,000 at the time.

=== 1984–2018: Sale to Peter Brant, merger with ARTnews ===
Whitney Communications sold the magazine in 1984 to Brant Publications, a new company started by businessman Peter Brant.

In January 2008, Brant purchased his ex-wife's 50 percent stake in Brant Publications, becoming the sole owner of the company. Baker stepped down as editor in June 2008 after 30 years to become an editor-at-large, having increased the circulation to 75,000; staff senior editor Marcia E. Vetrocq was named the new editor of the magazine. Art market blogger and Bloomberg News reporter Lindsay Pollock was named editor in 2011; critic Charlie Finch reported that Vetrocq learned she had been fired via an article in The New York Times announcing Pollock's hiring.

In 2015, Brant Publications sold Art in America and several other magazine brands to ARTnews SA, the parent company of ARTnews magazine, one of A.i.A.'s primary historical competitors. As part of the sale, Brant Publications became the new majority owner of ARTnews SA and the two magazines formally merged, with the Art in America website absorbed into the ARTnews website. The following year, Brant Publications finalized transactions to repurchase both Art in America and ARTnews from ARTnews SA under the new entity Art Media Holdings. Pollock announced that she was leaving as editor in 2017. Writer William S. Smith, a co-founder of the online magazine Triple Canopy, was named the new editor the same year.

=== 2018–present: Penske ownership ===
In 2018, Penske Media Corporation, the parent company of Variety and Rolling Stone magazines, acquired Art in America and ARTnews from Brant Publications. Smith resigned as editor in 2021 to join the Hong Kong contemporary art museum M+. Sarah Douglas, editor of ARTnews, became the co-editor of both publications. Some time after the acquisition by Penske, Art in America scaled back to six issues a year and then four issues a year.

== Editors-in-chief ==
- Wilhelm Valentiner (1913–1917)
- Frederic Fairchild Sherman (1917–1940; founder)
- Jean Lipman (first joined in 1934, editor-in-chief 1941–1970)
- Brian O'Doherty (1971–1974)
- Elizabeth C. Baker (1974–2008)
- Marcia Vetrocq (2008–2011)
- Lindsay Pollock (2011–2017)
- William S. Smith (2017–2021)
- Sarah Douglas (2021–)

== Managing editors ==
- Joan Simon (1974–1983)
- Nancy Marmer (1983–1997)
- Richard Vine (1998–2008, 2013–)
- David Ebony (2008–2013)

== Notable contributors ==
A number of well-known artists have been commissioned to design special covers for the magazine. Edward Steichen did one for its 50th birthday; Alexander Calder, Robert Rauschenberg, Roy Lichtenstein and Robert Indiana also created covers. For its 100th birthday the magazine planned special covers by Richard Prince, Cindy Sherman, and Urs Fischer.

=== Notable writers ===
- Maurice Berger
- Mark Staff Brandl
- Alfred Corn
- Carol Diehl
- Franklin Einspruch
- Hal Foster
- Suzi Gablik
- Jamey Gambrell
- Eleanor Heartney
- Dave Hickey
- Henry T. Hopkins
- Travis Jeppesen
- Joe Lewis
- Nancy Marmer
- Ted Mooney
- Linda Nochlin
- Craig Owens
- Peter Plagens
- Nancy Princenthal
- Carter Ratcliff
- Walter Robinson
- Harold Rosenberg
- Peter Schjeldahl
- Stephen Westfall
- Akiko Ichikawa
