= Auburn University Marching Band =

Marching band of Auburn University

- School: Auburn University
- Location: Auburn, Alabama
- Conference: SEC
- Founded: 1897
- Director: Dr. Corey Spurlin
- Assistant Director: Dr. Nikki Gross
- Members: 380 (instruments and auxiliary)
- Rehearsal space: Goodwin Music Building
- Practice field: J.W. and Nell Birchfield Practice Field
- Fight song: "War Eagle", "Glory to 'Ole Auburn"

The Auburn University Marching Band (AUMB) is the marching band of Auburn University and the 2004 recipient of the Sudler Intercollegiate Marching Band Trophy. With 380 members, the band traces its origins to 1897 when M. Thomas Fullan proposed to then-president Dr. William Broun that the drum corps accompanying cadet drills be replaced with a full instrumental band.

On January 7, 2024, the Auburn University Marching Band achieved a significant milestone by winning the first-ever Metallica Marching Band Competition. They secured victories in both the Collegiate Division 1 category and the Fan Favorite category. The competition, which was organized by the heavy metal band Metallica, challenged marching bands at both high school and collegiate levels to create performances incorporating Metallica's music. The Auburn University Marching Band distinguished themselves among the competitors, which included bands from various universities such as Fresno State University, Iowa State University, University of Iowa, University of Texas at Austin, and Western Illinois University.

The Auburn Marching Band's victory brought them $85,000 in musical equipment, courtesy of Metallica and its sponsors. This competition was a significant event in the marching band community, with over 450 schools participating and showcasing their unique and impressive performances.

The Auburn University Marching Band performs pre-game and halftime shows at all Auburn Tigers football home games and travels to most away games. The full band travels to the Deep South's Oldest Rivalry game against Georgia when it is held in Athens, and the Iron Bowl against Alabama when it is held in Tuscaloosa. (A smaller pep band composed of AUMB members supports the Auburn Tigers at all away games the full band does not attend.) The band has marched in three presidential inaugural parades; those of Presidents Harry S. Truman (1949), George H. W. Bush (1989), and George W. Bush (2005). It is the only band in the SEC that does not have a nickname. Former Auburn University President Dr. Harry Philpott said the following about the band:

"Some other institutions need to give descriptive names to their bands in order to praise them. The quality of the music, the precision of its drills, and the fine image that it portrays have made it unnecessary for us to say more than, 'This is the Auburn University Band.'"

== History ==
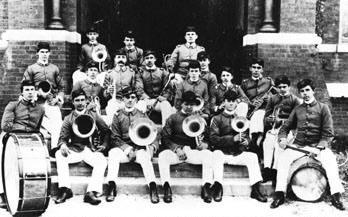
The original Auburn Band in 1897

- The band was formed in 1897 under the first director, M. Thomas Fullan.
- In 1906 Albert L. Thomas became band director.
- P. R. Bidez became the third band director in 1916.
- In 1917, under Bidez, the band went to Europe along with allied forces as the 16th Infantry Regimental Band (The 16th Infantry Regiment was part of the larger 1st Expeditionary Force, which paraded through Paris, France on July 4, 1917).
- In 1945 Auburn's music department was formed.
- Female majorettes were added in 1946.
- The band performed at Harry Truman's inauguration parade in 1949.
- Women began playing instruments in the band in 1950.
- David A. Herbert became the fourth band director in 1951.
- Burton R. Leidner became band director in 1955.
- In 1955 "War Eagle" replaced the Auburn Victory March as Auburn's fight song.
- Dr. Wilbur "Bodie" Hinton became band director in 1956.
- Dr. Bill Walls became band director in 1969 (director of bands beginning 1985).
- Deborah Whatley became the first female drum major at Auburn and marched as drum major for the 1972 and 1973 football seasons.
- Dr. Bill Walls appointed Jeffery Rowser to be the first African American drum major in the history of Auburn University and the Southeastern Conference.
- Dr. Johnnie B. Vinson took over as director of bands in 1991.
- The band was awarded the Sudler Trophy in 2004 for continued excellence in marching. This award can only be given to a band once.
- Dr. Rick Good became director of bands in 2007 after serving as marching band director, and continues in this position today.
- Dr. Corey Spurlin was hired in 2007 as marching band director.
- In 2008, the Auburn University Marching Band made its first overseas appearance, marching in the St. Patrick's Day Parade in Dublin, Ireland.
- The 2009 edition of the AUMB was the largest in the program's history with 380 members. The full band made appearances at all home games and trips to Knoxville, Tennessee, and Athens, Georgia. A smaller pep band represented the band at all other away games.
- The 2010 AUMB once again had 380 members, and performed at all home games, while taking the entire band to Ole Miss, Alabama, the 2010 SEC Championship Game in Atlanta, Georgia, and the 2011 BCS National Championship Game in Glendale, Arizona. A smaller pep band represented the band at all other away games. The band also moved to a new practice field, and kicked off its new building campaign entitled "Onto Vict'ry, Strike Up the Band."
- On January 7, 2024, the Auburn University Marching Band achieved a significant milestone by winning the first-ever Metallica Marching Band Competition. They secured victories in both the Collegiate Division 1 category and the Fan Favorite category.

== Leadership ==
=== Staff ===
Directly overseeing the AUMB is the marching band director, who is also the associate director of bands. He leads all full-band rehearsals and performances. While many of the duties are delegated to his GTAs or student leaders, it is his responsibility to ensure the success of the band as a whole. Dr. Corey Spurlin was hired in 2007 as the marching band director upon the promotion of Dr. Rick Good. Spurlin received his undergraduate and master's degrees from the University of Alabama and his doctorate from Louisiana State University in Conducting.

The marching band director also has an assistant, who assumes the duties of the director in his absence. Dr. Nikki Gross was hired in 2015 as the assistant director of athletic bands.

Overseeing all the Auburn Bands is the director of bands. In 2007, Dr. Rick Good was promoted to the director of bands position. Good spent 13 years as the marching band director and associate professor of low brass. He took the position upon the retirement of the previous director of bands, Dr. Johnnie Vinson.

In March 2022, the AUMB welcomed Ashley Evans as the auxiliaries coordinator. In this role, she oversees the Danceline, Flagline, and Majorettes, collectively known as the Tiger Eyes. Ashley Evans is not only an alumnus of the band but also served as a standout performer during her tenure. She was a majorette at Auburn from 2012 to 2016 and led as the captain of the Majorettes in her junior and senior years. Her experience and leadership in these positions have equipped her with a deep understanding of the program, making her an ideal choice for guiding the Tiger Eyes.

== Organization ==
=== Winds and percussion ===
Currently, the instrumentation of the AUMB is as follows:

- Piccolos
- Clarinets
- Alto saxophones
- Trumpets
- Mellophones
- Trombones
- Baritones
- Tubas (sousaphones)
- Drumline (includes front ensemble)

=== Tiger Eyes ===
The Tiger Eyes are the visual ensemble of the Auburn University Marching Band. The Tiger Eyes nickname was given in 2005. The Tiger Eyes are composed of three lines - flags, majorettes, and dancers - that perform complementary choreography. Tiger Eyes are selected by individual auditions. The band added a flag corps in the fall of 1985.

== R.A.T. program ==
The Auburn University Marching Band has a freshman orientation program, more commonly referred to as the R.A.T. Program. Nowadays, R.A.T. is used as an acronym for "Rookie Auburn Tiger" and is a term of endearment. This is only used by the marching band and Auburn football team.

== Alumni Band ==
In 1987 a new tradition began, the annual Auburn Alumni Band reunion. Every year since then a band of alumni has joined the AUMB on the field at halftime during one home football game. This game is often the homecoming game, but not always. This annual event normally attracts over 300 alumni band members from many previous years, resulting in over 600 members of the combined bands on the field for halftime. This show has been a favorite among band members since its inception, and continues to be a fond highlight of each football season. The alumni band has also taken up the challenge to support the fund raising efforts for the new band facility currently under development.

2010–2011 board of directors:

- President: David Gillespie
- President Elect: Ted Mallory
- Secretary/ treasurer: Sara Cothran
- Past president: Ben Morris
- Director emeritus: Johnnie Vinson

Directors:

- Clyde Morris
- Owen Bailey
- Steve Fleming
- Terri Devane Granger
- George Dyar
- Mark Glover
- Sidney Keywood
- Susan Nunnelly
- Mike Watson
- Jay Howell
- Joseph Stanfield
