= Bee Hive =

The term Bee Hive can refer to:

- Bee hive, an alternate spelling of the word beehive
- Bee Hive, Alabama, an unincorporated community
- The Bee-Hive (journal), a 19th-century British newspaper
- Bee Hive Records, a jazz record label
- Bee Hives, a 2004 album by Broken Social Scene of B-sides and rarities
- Bee Hive (peak), a mountain in Zion National Park, Utah, United States
