= Auburn University Chapel =

- Auburn Players Theater
- U.S. National Register of Historic Places
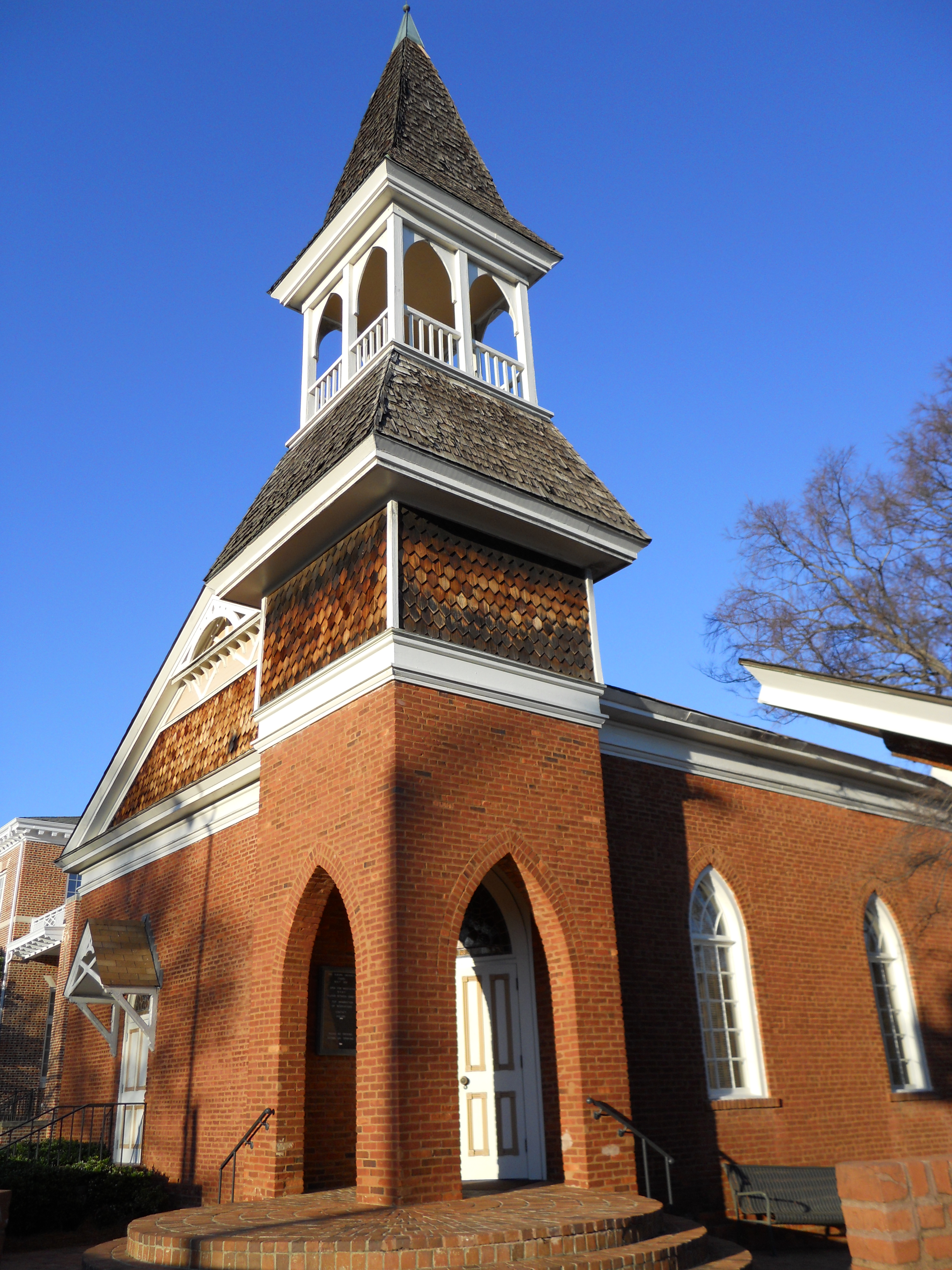
- Auburn University Chapel in 2011

- Location within Alabama Location within the United States
- Location: College St. at Thach Ave., Auburn, Alabama
- Coordinates: 32°36′16″N 85°28′53″W
- Built: 1851
- Architect: Edwin Reese
- Architectural style: Gothic Revival
- NRHP reference No.: 73000351
- Added to NRHP: May 22, 1973

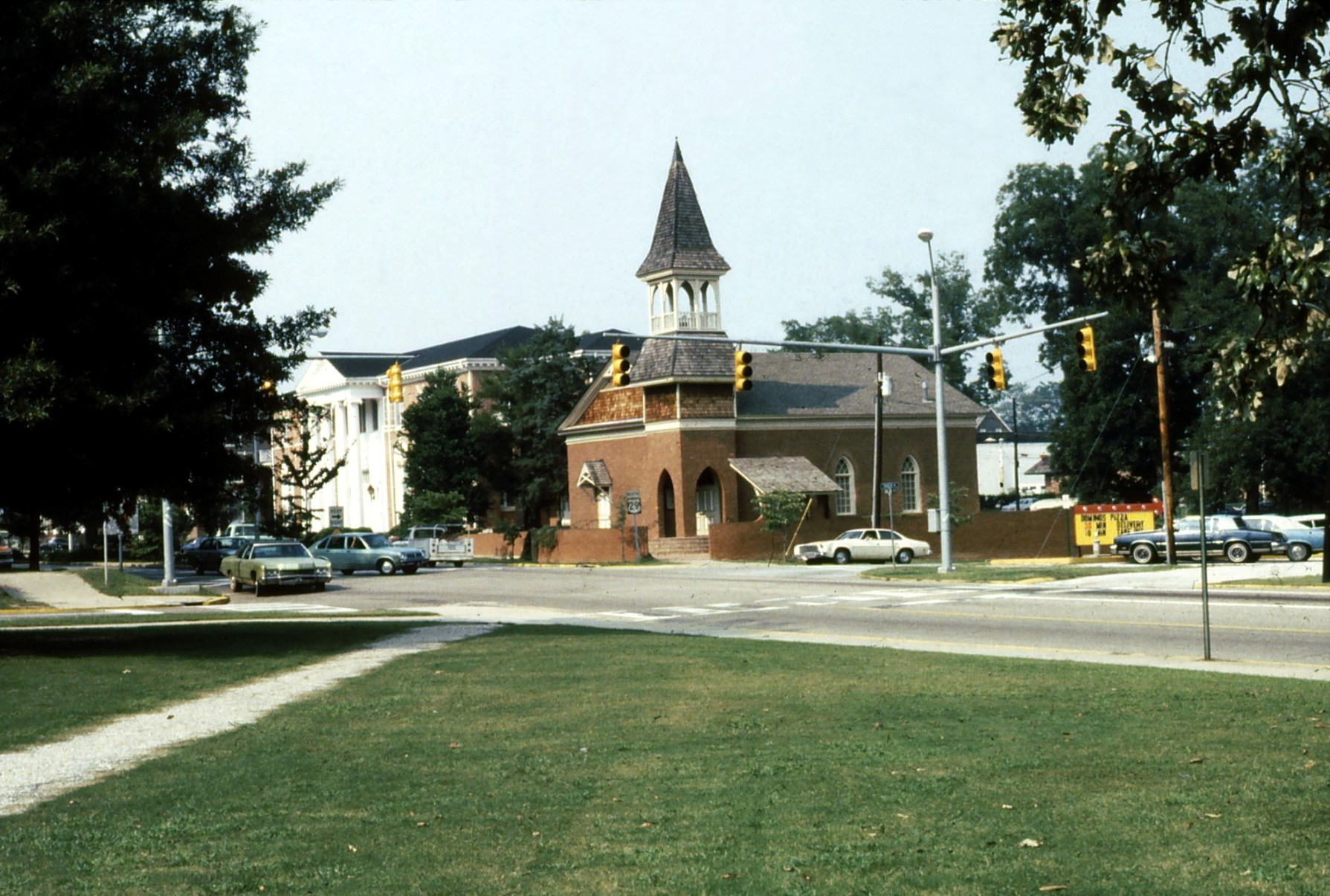
The Auburn University Chapel in Auburn, Alabama as it appeared in 1982

The Auburn University Chapel is the second-oldest building and oldest building in its original location on the campus of Auburn University in Auburn, Alabama.

== History ==
The chapel was built in 1851 as a Presbyterian church, using slave labor, in the Greek Revival style. During the Civil War, the building briefly served as a Confederate hospital for wounded soldiers, and later in the century was temporarily divided into classrooms when the main building of the nearby Alabama Agricultural and Mechanical College burned in 1887.

Around 1900, the church was renovated in a Gothic style. The building was sold to the college in 1921, where it became the YMCA/YWCA center for a few years. From 1927 to 1973, it housed the Auburn Players Theater, the college's acting troupe. Between 1973 and 1976, the structure underwent a significant renovation for conversion to the Auburn University Chapel, an interdenominational, multipurpose building, a function it still serves today. The building was added to the National Register of Historic Places as Auburn Players Theater on May 22, 1973.The Auburn University Chapel is believed to be the oldest public establishment in Auburn. It often held weddings and dinners on the lawn. Between 1850 and 1976, the Auburn University Chapel has transitioned from church, to hospital, to classroom, to theatre, and then finally back to a church.

The Auburn University Chapel is believed to be haunted. While treating war soldiers, death was inevitable. One death that particularly stands out is the death of Sydney Grimlett. Grimlett was fighting in the Civil War when he suffered an injury and had a procedure to amputate his leg; he did not survive this procedure. The Troupe Theatre group took over in the 1920s, soon audience members began noticing orbs near actors, during state productions. Performers in the group soon noticed objects and props missing from the set. However, Grimlett gained a reputation as a kind ghost and obeys when given candy as an incentive. When the Troupe Theatre group moved they invited Sydney Grimlett to come with and has resided wherever the Troupe may travel.
