= Auburn University =

Public university in Auburn, Alabama, US

Coordinates: 32.603°N 85.486°W

- Former names: East Alabama Male College (1856–1872); Agricultural and Mechanical College of Alabama (1872–1899); Alabama Polytechnic Institute (1899–1960)
- Motto: "Research, Instruction, Extension" "For the Advancement of Science and Arts"
- Type: Public land-grant research university
- Established: February 7, 1856; 170 years ago
- Parent institution: Auburn University system
- Accreditation: SACS
- Academic affiliations: ORAU; ACES; sea-grant; space-grant
- Endowment: $1.4 billion (FY2025)
- Budget: $2.12 billion (FY2027)
- President: Christopher B. Roberts
- Provost: Vini Nathan
- Academic staff: 1,432 (2021)
- Administrative staff: 3,915 (2021)
- Students: 34,195
- Undergraduates: 26,874
- Postgraduates: 6,141
- Location: Auburn, Alabama, United States
- Campus: Small city, 1,841 acres (7.45 km^{2})
- Colors: Burnt orange and navy blue
- Nickname: Tigers
- Sporting affiliations: NCAA Division I FBS – SEC
- Mascot: Aubie the Tiger
- Website: auburn.edu

Auburn University (informally known as AU or Auburn) is a public land-grant research university in Auburn, Alabama, United States. With more than 27,900 undergraduate students, over 6,200 graduate students, and a total enrollment of more than 34,100 students with 1,435 faculty members, Auburn is the second-largest university in Alabama. It is one of the state's two flagship public universities. The university is one of 146 U.S. universities classified among "R1: Doctoral Universities – Very high research activity".

Auburn was chartered in 1856, as East Alabama Male College, a private liberal arts college affiliated with the Methodist Episcopal Church, South. In 1872, under the Morrill Act, it became the state's first land-grant university and was renamed the Agricultural and Mechanical College of Alabama. In 1892, it became the first four-year coeducational school in Alabama and in 1899 was officially renamed Alabama Polytechnic Institute, a name that had been in informal use since as early as 1896. In 1960, its name was changed to Auburn University.

In 1967, the Alabama Legislature chartered an additional campus in Montgomery as a member of the Auburn University system.

== History ==
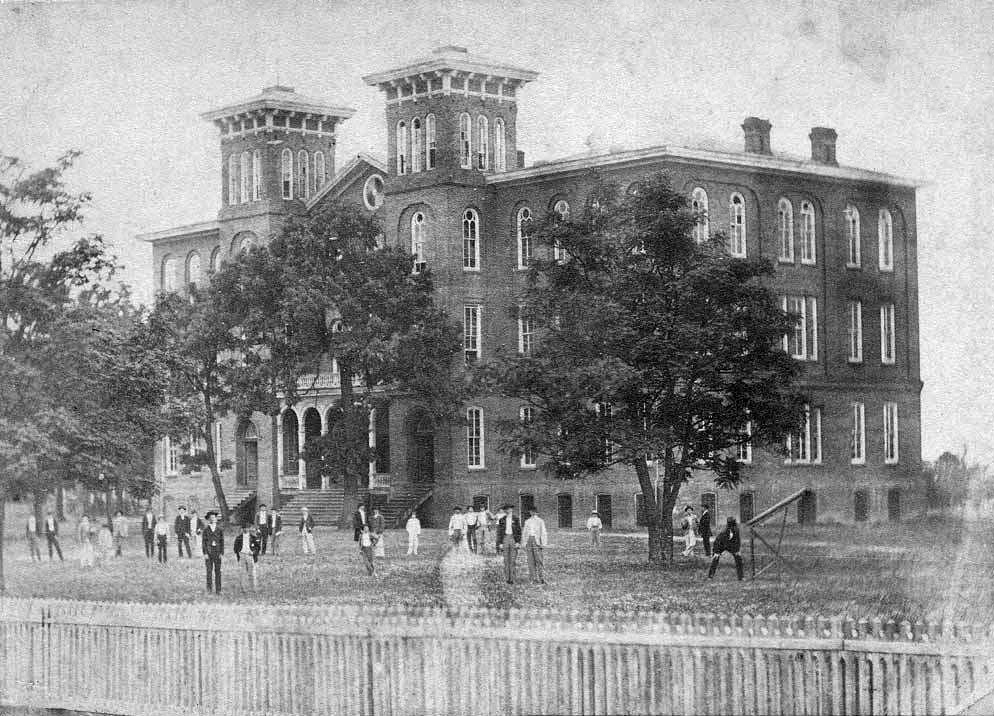
"Old Main", the first building on Auburn's campus, was destroyed by a fire in 1887.

The Alabama Legislature chartered the institution as the East Alabama Male College on February 1, 1856, coming under the guidance of the Methodist Church in 1859. The first president of the college was Reverend William J. Sasnett. The college began operations with a student body of 80 and a faculty of 10 in 1859.

Auburn's early history is inextricably linked with the Civil War and the Reconstruction-era South. Classes were held in "Old Main" until the college was closed due to the war when most of the students and faculty left to enlist. The campus was a training ground for the Confederate Army and "Old Main" served as a hospital for Confederate wounded.

A historic landmark cannon lathe, built in Selma and used to bore 7-inch Brooke rifles during the Civil War, was presented to Auburn in 1936 by the Tennessee Coal, Iron and Railroad Company, and rests on the lawn next to Samford Hall. In 1952, the fraternity Alpha Phi Omega held an "ugliest man" contest to fund a bronze plaque for the lathe.

=== Post–Civil War ===
The school reopened in 1866 after the end of the Civil War, its only closure. In 1872, control of the institution was transferred from the Methodist Church to the State of Alabama for financial reasons. The Reconstruction-era Alabama government placed the school under the provisions of the Morrill Act as a land-grant institution, the first in the South to be established separately from the state university, which in this case was the University of Alabama. This act provided for 240,000 acres (970 km^{2}) of Federal land to be sold to provide funds for an agricultural and mechanical school. As a result, in 1872, the school was renamed to the Agricultural and Mechanical College of Alabama.

Under the act's provisions, land-grant institutions were also supposed to teach military tactics and train officers for the United States military. In the late 19th century, most students at the Agricultural and Mechanical College of Alabama were enrolled in the cadet program, learning military tactics and training to become officers. Each county in the state was allowed to nominate two cadets to attend the college free of charge.

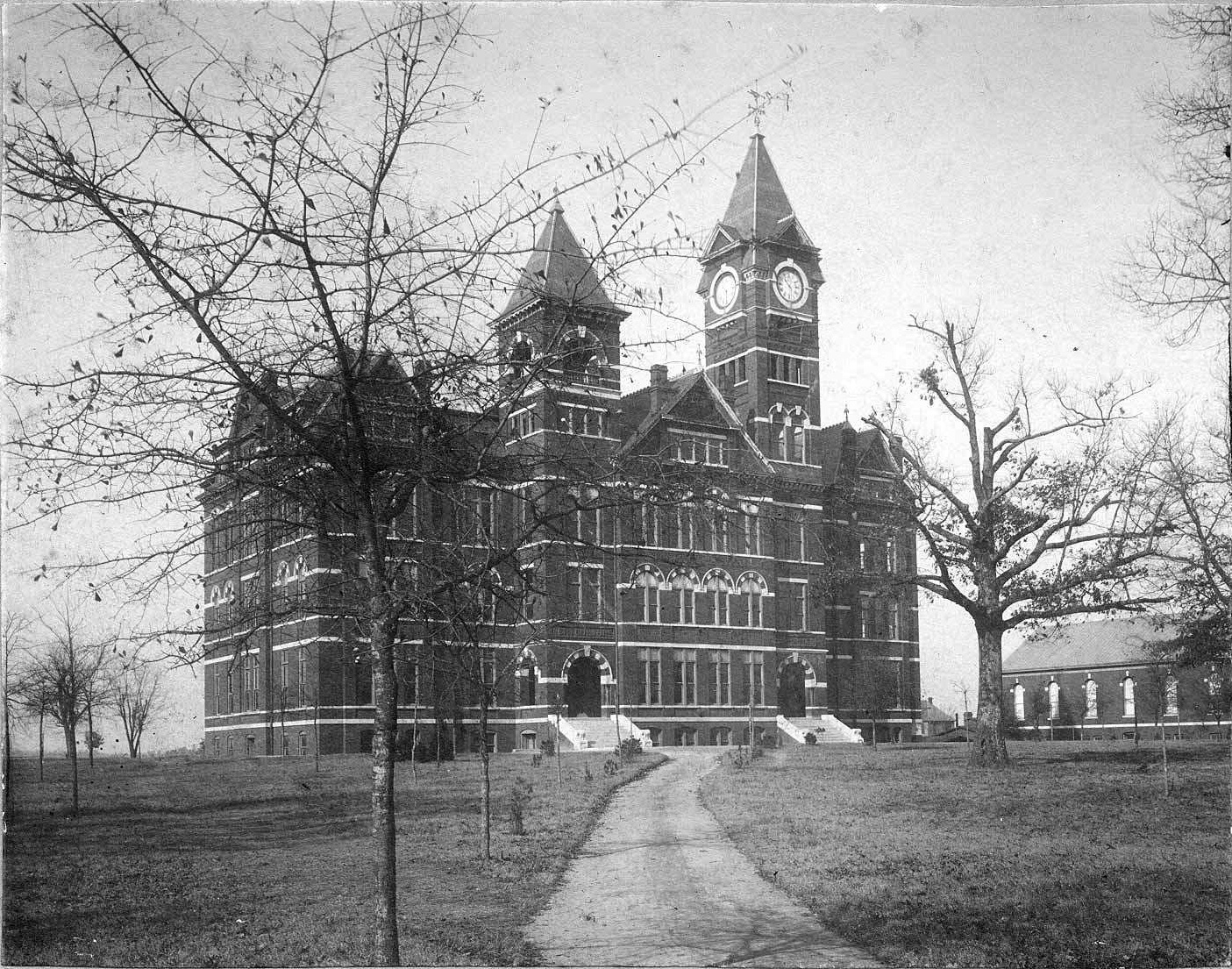
Samford Hall in the 1890s

The university's original curriculum focused on engineering and agriculture. This trend changed under the guidance of William Leroy Broun, who taught classics and sciences and believed both disciplines were important for the growth of the university and the individual. In 1892, two historic events occurred: women were admitted to the Agricultural and Mechanical College of Alabama and football was played as a school sport. Eventually, football replaced polo as the main sport on campus. The college was renamed the Alabama Polytechnic Institute (API) in 1899, largely because of Broun's influence.

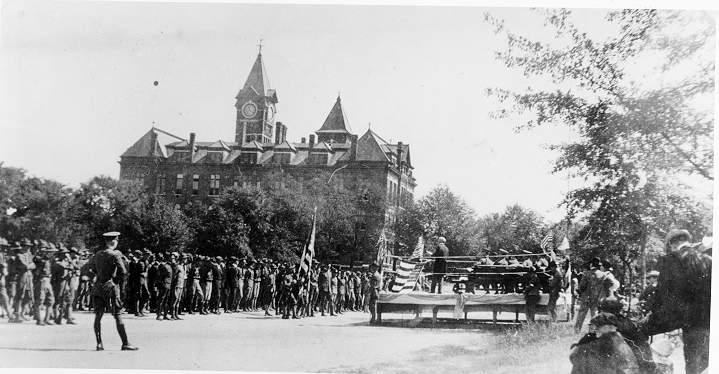
API cadets drill on Ross Square in 1918.

On October 1, 1918, nearly all of API's able-bodied male students 18 or older voluntarily joined the United States Army for short-lived military careers on campus. The student soldiers numbered 878, according to API president Charles Thach, and formed the academic section of the Student Army Training Corps. The vocational section was composed of enlisted men sent to Auburn for training in radio and mechanics. The students received honorable discharges two months later, following the Armistice that ended World War I. API struggled through the Great Depression, having scrapped an extensive expansion program by then-President Bradford Knapp. Faculty salaries were cut drastically and enrollment decreased, along with state appropriations to the college. By the end of the 1930s, Auburn had essentially recovered but then faced new conditions caused by World War II.

As war approached in 1940, there was a great shortage of engineers and scientists needed for the defense industries. The U.S. Office of Education asked all American engineering schools to join in a "crash" program to produce what was often called "instant engineers". API became an early participant in an activity that eventually became Engineering, Science, and Management War Training (ESMWT). Fully funded by the government and coordinated by Auburn's Dean of Engineering, college-level courses were given in concentrated, mainly evening classes at sites across Alabama. Taken by thousands of adults – including many women – these courses helped fill the wartime ranks of civilian engineers, chemists, and other technical professionals.

During the war, API also trained U.S. military personnel on campus; between 1941 and 1945, 32,000 troops attended the university in some manner. Following the end of World War II, as with many other colleges around the country, API experienced a period of massive growth caused by returning military personnel taking advantage of the GI Bill's offer of free education. In the years following the end of the war, enrollment at API more than doubled that of pre-war enrollment.

=== Name change to Auburn ===
Recognizing the school had moved beyond its agricultural and mechanical roots, it was granted university status by the Alabama Legislature in 1960 and renamed to "Auburn University", which came from it being unofficially called "Auburn" since at least the 1930s, when Jordan-Hare Stadium opened in 1939 as "Auburn Stadium".

=== Civil rights era to present ===
Auburn University was racially segregated prior to 1963, with only white students being admitted. Integration began in 1964 with the admittance of the first African-American student, Harold A. Franklin. Franklin had to sue the university to gain admission to the graduate school and was denied a degree after he completed his master's thesis. He eventually was awarded his master's in history in 2020. The first degree granted to an African-American was in 1967. According to Auburn University's Office of Institutional Research and Assessment, African-Americans comprise 1,828 of the university's 24,864 undergraduates (7.35%), as of 2013 and 49 of the 1,192 full-time faculty (4.1%), as of 2012. Auburn has increased its "Black or African American" faculty percentage from 4.3% in 2003 to 4.7% in 2025, since the settlement of legal challenges to the underrepresentation of African Americans in AU's faculty in 2006.

In 2018, the university began a speaker series to promote racial diversity named Critical Conversations.

In 2024, Auburn eliminated its Office of Inclusion and Diversity to obey SB 129, the bill that Governor Kay Ivey signed that banned DEI programs.

== Campus ==
Hargis Hall, built in 1888 and named after Estes H. Hargis

The Auburn campus is primarily arranged in a grid-like pattern with several distinct building groups. The northern section of the central campus (bounded by Magnolia Ave. and Thach Ave.) contains most of the College of Engineering buildings, the Lowder business building, and the older administration buildings. The middle section of the central campus (bounded by Thach Ave. and Roosevelt Dr.) contains the College of Liberal Arts (except fine arts) and the College of Education, mostly within Haley Center. The southern section of the central campus (bounded by Roosevelt Dr. and Samford Ave.) contains most of the buildings related to the College of Science and Mathematics, as well as fine arts buildings.

Several erratic building spurts, beginning in the 1950s, have resulted in some exceptions to the subject clusters as described above. Growing interaction issues between pedestrians and vehicles led to the closure of a significant portion of Thach Avenue to vehicular traffic in 2004. A similarly sized portion of Roosevelt Drive was also closed to vehicles in 2005. In an effort to make a more appealing walkway, these two sections have been converted from asphalt to concrete. The general movement towards a pedestrian only campus is ongoing, but is often limited by the requirements for emergency and maintenance vehicular access.

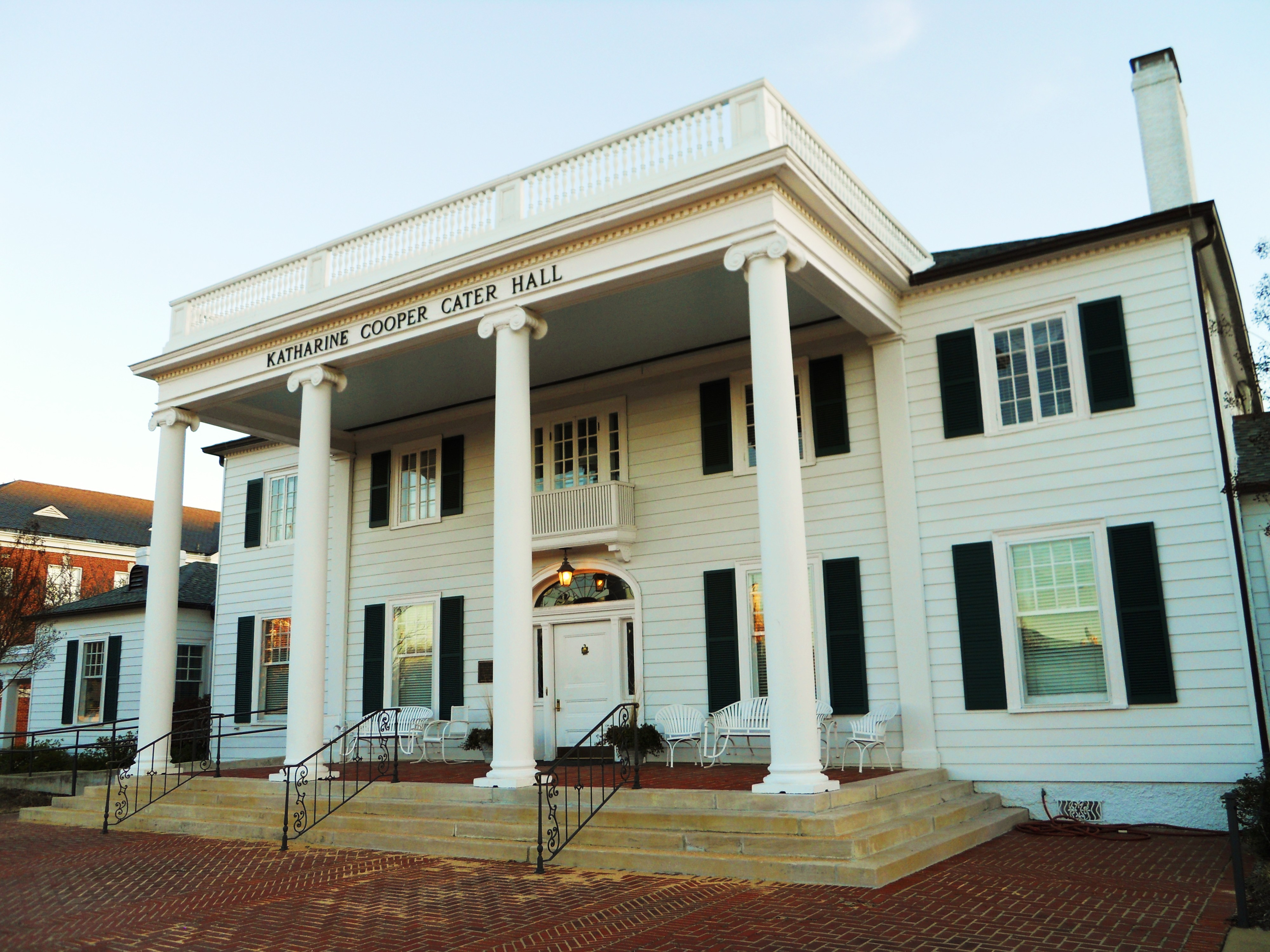
Katharine Cooper Cater Hall

The current period of ongoing construction began around 2000. All recently constructed buildings have used a more traditional architectural style that is similar to the style of Samford Hall, Mary Martin Hall, and the Quad dorms. The Science Center complex was completed in 2005. This complex contains chemistry labs, traditional classrooms, and a large lecture hall. A new medical clinic opened behind the Hill dorm area. Taking the place of the old medical clinic and a few other older buildings, is the Shelby Center for Engineering Technology. Phase I of the Shelby Center opened in the spring of 2008, with regular classes being held starting with the summer 2008 term. A new student center opened in 2008.

In recent years, the university has been replacing or renovating older buildings. Completed in August 2017, the Mell Classroom Building was attached to the Ralph Brown Draughon Library, offering a new flexible learning space. A brand-new 89,000 square foot building for the school of nursing was also finished in 2017; it features active learning classrooms, skill and simulation labs, and public gathering areas. In 2019, two significant projects were finished: the Brown Kopel Engineering Student Achievement Center, which includes classrooms, student study spaces, a wind-tunnel laboratory, meeting spaces, and departmental spaces for professional development and labor relations; and the opening of a new Graduate Business Building, which includes flexible classrooms and lecture halls, student study pods, team areas, and offices for the college's MBA program. Most recent developments include an $83 million academic classroom and laboratory complex with a seating capacity of 2,000 students in 20 adaptable classrooms and laboratories, six EASL classrooms, and five lecture halls. A new 800-seat central dining hall with reservable dining and study areas as well as retail options is also part of the complex. Completed in August 2022, the Tony and Libba Rane Culinary Science Center combines instructional and laboratory space with operational food venues and hotel spaces in which students can obtain experiential real-world training. The new college of education building, scheduled to open in 2024 and located on the site of the former Hill dorms, is one of the projects currently under construction. This building will include collaborative classrooms, instructional laboratories, up-to-date technology, and administrative spaces for faculty and staff. The new 265,000 square foot $200 million STEM+Ag Complex will replace older STEM-related and agricultural science facilities on the former Hill site. It will offer new space for cutting-edge wet and dry research labs, collaboration spaces, shared lab support spaces, and instructional labs for six departments. The complex is scheduled to open in 2026. The STEM + Ag complex represents Auburn's largest-ever investment in academic facilities.

== Organization and administration ==
The university is led by President Christopher Roberts and the Board of Trustees, including Governor Kay Ivey who is the president of board. Under the president, there are senior vice presidents for student affairs, academic affairs, advancement, business and administration, research and economic development, and legal affairs. There are also various other directors, vice presidents, and the chancellor of Auburn University at Montgomery. Vini Nathan, the provost and senior vice president for academic affairs, which is over the academics at the university, which are organized into 13 colleges and a graduate school:

College	Founded	Dean	Notes
College of Agriculture	1872	Arthur Appel (interim dean)	Previously called School of Agriculture and Biological Sciences until 1986.
College of Architecture, Design and Construction	1907	Dawn Finley	Previously called School of Architecture and Fine Arts until 1986.
Raymond J. Harbert College of Business	1967	Jennifer Mueller-Phillips	
College of Education	1915	Jeffrey T. Fairbrother	
Samuel Ginn College of Engineering	1872	Mario Eden	
College of Forestry and Wildlife Sciences	1984	Janaki Alavalapati	
Honors College	1979	Laura Stevens	Instead of a dean, the Honors College has a director.
College of Human Sciences	1916	Susan Hubbard	
College of Liberal Arts	1986	Jason Hicks	Formerly the School of Arts and Sciences, founded in 1872. Adopted part of the School of Architecture and Fine Arts.
College of Nursing	1979	Gregg Newschwander	
James Harrison College of Pharmacy	1885	Leigh Ann Ross	
College of Sciences and Mathematics	1986	Edward Thomas	Formerly the School of Arts and Sciences, founded in 1872. Adopted part of the School of Agriculture and Biological Sciences.
College of Veterinary Medicine	1907	Calvin Johnson	
Graduate School	1872	Ash Abebe	
Library		Shali Zhang	

== Academics ==
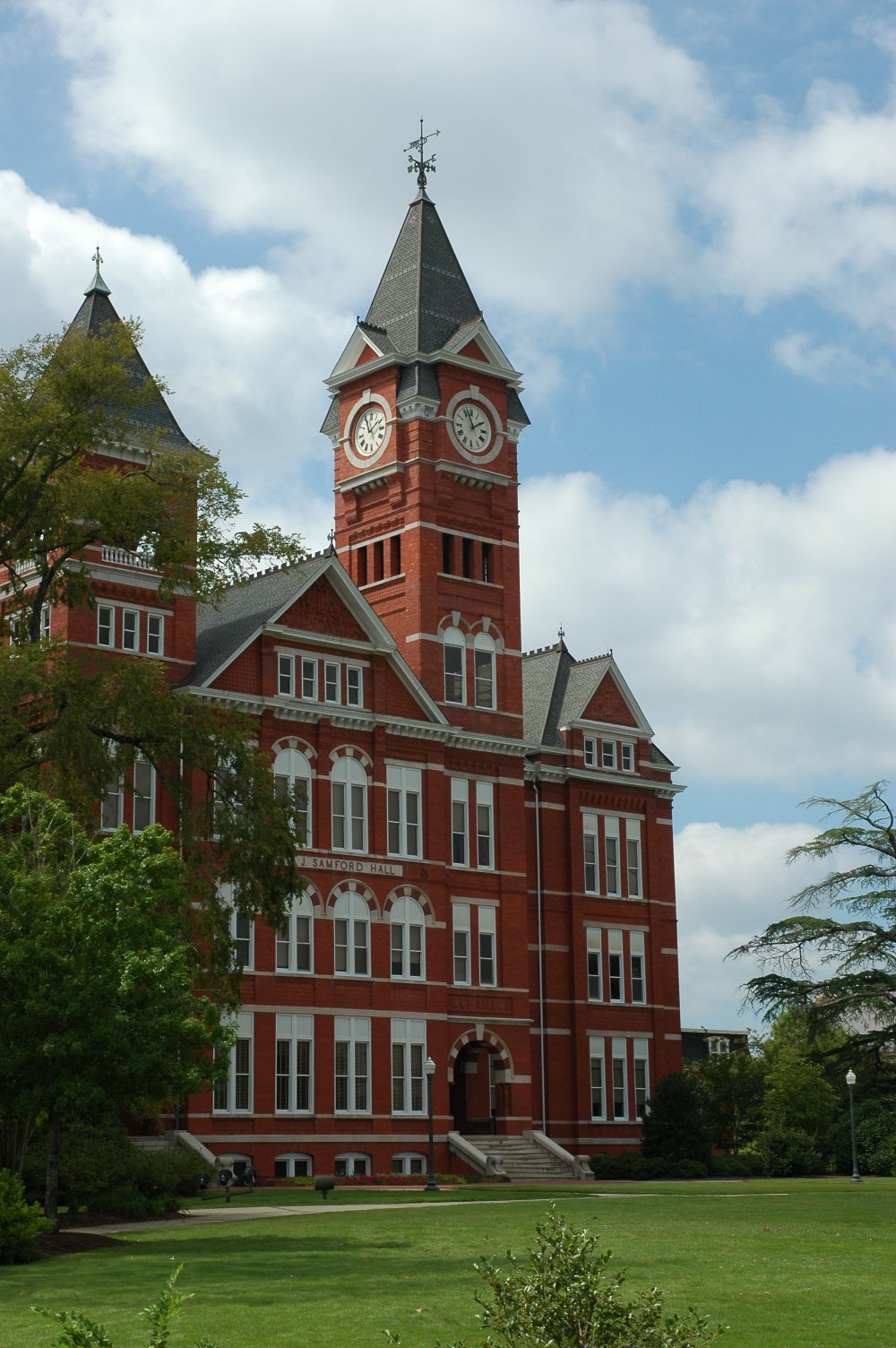
Samford Hall houses administrative offices.

The 2025 edition of U.S. News & World Report ranks Auburn as tied for the 105th best national university overall in the U.S., 51st among public universities, and 171st in "Best Value Schools".

Academic rankings

National
- Forbes: 163
- U.S. News & World Report: 105
- Washington Monthly: 263
- WSJ/College Pulse: 174

Global
- ARWU: 501-600
- QS: 851-900
- THE: 601–800
- U.S. News & World Report: 623

USNWR graduate school rankings
Business	56
Education	84
Engineering	71
Nursing: Master's	123

USNWR departmental rankings
Audiology	46
Biological Sciences	112
Chemistry	88
Clinical Psychology	80
Computer Science	91
English	116
History	125
Mathematics	94
Pharmacy	31
Physics	110
Psychology	98
Public Affairs	65
Rehabilitation Counseling	15
Speech-Language Pathology	72
Veterinary Medicine	14

Auburn is a charter member of the Southeastern Conference (SEC), currently composed of fifteen of the largest Southern universities in the U.S. Among the other twelve pre-2024 merger peer public universities, Auburn was ranked fourth in the 2011 edition of U.S. News & World Report.

By 2018, this had risen to $778.2 million, thanks to a $500 million "It Begins at Auburn" growth campaign began in 2005, the most successful in school history. By 2017, the university raised over $1.2 billion in the "Because This is Auburn" campaign, being the first university in Alabama to raise over $1 billion as well as being the most successful fundraising campaign in school history.

Auburn University is ranked the sixth-most LGBTQ-unfriendly campus by The Princeton Review in its 2020 rankings of the 386 American campuses that it surveys.

Auburn's College of Architecture pioneered the nation's first interior architecture degree program; its dual degree Architecture & Interior Architecture degree was the first in the nation. Of special mention is the School's Rural Studio program, founded by the late Samuel Mockbee.

The Samuel Ginn College of Engineering has a 134-year tradition of engineering education, consistently ranking in the nation's largest 20 engineering programs in terms of numbers of engineers graduating annually. The college has a combined enrollment of close to 4,000. In 2001, Samuel L. Ginn, a noted U.S. pioneer in wireless communication and an Auburn alumnus, made a $25 million gift to the college and announced plans to spearhead an additional $150 million in support. This gave Auburn the first Bachelor of Wireless Engineering degree program in the United States. Auburn University was the first university in the Southeast to offer the bachelor of software engineering degree and the master of software engineering degree. Auburn was also the only school to offer a degree in the 2000s for Polymer & Fiber Engineering, combining medical research, advanced composites, sustainability and recycling and other disciplines into an advanced material science offering for undergraduates through doctorate degrees. Despite significant corporate sponsorship, such as from Under Armour, the undergraduate offering of the department was disbanded and absorbed into other departments leaving options for higher degrees.

Ross Hall, home to Auburn's Department of Chemical Engineering

Auburn has historically placed much of its emphasis on the education of engineers at the undergraduate level and in recent years, has been ranked as high as the 10th largest undergraduate engineering program in the U.S. in terms of the number of undergraduate degrees awarded on annual basis. The Ginn College of Engineering is now focused on expanding the graduate programs and was recently ranked 60th nationally with doctoral programs in engineering by U.S. News & World Report. Last year, the college ranked 67th among all engineering programs.

Auburn's Economics Department (formerly in the College of Business, now in the College of Liberal Arts) was ranked 123rd in the world in 1999 by the Journal of Applied Econometrics. Auburn was rated ahead of such international powerhouses as INSEAD in France (141st) and the London Business School (146th). Auburn's MBA Program in the College of Business has annually been ranked by U.S. News & World Report magazine in the top ten percent of the nation's more than 750 MBA Programs. The Ludwig von Mises Institute (LvMI) offices were once located in the business department of Auburn University, and the LvMI continues to work with the university on many levels.

ROTC programs are available in three branches of service: Air Force, Army, and Navy/Marine Corps, with the latter being the only one in Alabama. Over 100 officers who attended Auburn have reached flag rank (general or admiral), including one, Carl Epting Mundy Jr., who served as commandant of the U.S. Marine Corps. Auburn is one of only seven universities in the Nuclear Enlisted Commissioning Program, and has historically been one of the top ROTC producers of Navy nuclear submarine officers.

In addition to the ROTC graduates commissioned through Auburn, two master's degree alumni from Auburn, four-star generals Hugh Shelton and Richard Myers, served as chairman of the Joint Chiefs of Staff in the last decade. Both officers received their commissions elsewhere, and attended Auburn for an M.S. (Shelton) and M.B.A. (Myers).

Auburn has graduated six astronauts (including T.K. Mattingly of Apollo 13 fame) and one current and one former director of the Kennedy Space Center. 1972 Auburn Mechanical Engineering graduate Jim Kennedy, currently director of NASA's Kennedy Space Center, was previously deputy director of NASA's Marshall Space Flight Center (MSFC). Several hundred Auburn graduates, primarily engineers and scientists, currently work directly for NASA or NASA contractors. Hundreds of Auburn engineers worked for NASA at MSFC during the peak years of the "space race" in the 1960s, when the Saturn and Apollo moon programs were in full development.

Fall freshman statistics
	2024	2023	2022	2015	2014	2013	2012	2011	2010	2009	2008
Applicants	55,056	48,179	46,010	19,414	16,958	15,745	17,463	18,323	15,784	14,862	17,068
Admits	25,284	24,315	19,909	15,077	14,124	13,027	13,486	12,827	12,417	11,816	12,085
% Admitted	45.9	50.5	43.3	77.7	83.3	82.7	77.2	70.0	78.6	79.5	70.8
Enrolled	6,103	5,935	5,311	4,902	4,592	3,726	3,852	4,202	4,204	3,918	3,984
Avg GPA	4.09	4.07	4.05	3.83	3.77	3.74	3.78	3.78	3.78	3.69	3.69
Avg ACT	27.4	27.1	28.1	27.3	27.0	26.9	26.9	27.2	26.9	26.2	25.9
Avg SAT composite*		1290	1300	1174	1168	1168	1185	1232	1208	1183	1175
*(out of 1600)

Auburn University owns and operates the 423-acre (1.71 km^{2}) Auburn University Regional Airport, providing flight education and fuel, maintenance, and airplane storage. The Auburn University Aviation Department is fully certified by the FAA as an Air Agency with examining authority for private, commercial, instrument, and multiengine courses. In April 2015, Auburn University received the nation's first FAA approval to operate a new Unmanned Aircraft Systems Flight School as part of the Auburn University Aviation Center. The College of Business's Department of Aviation Management and Supply Chain Management is the only program in the country to hold dual accreditation by the Association to Advance Collegiate Schools of Business (AACSB) and the Aviation Accreditation Board International (AABI). Created over 65 years ago, Auburn's flight program is also the second oldest university flight program in the United States.

The Old Rotation on campus is the oldest continuous agricultural experiment in the Southeast, and third oldest in the United States, dating from 1896. In addition, the work of David Bransby on the use of switchgrass as a biofuel was the source of its mention in the 2006 State of the Union Address.

The university recently began a Master of Real Estate Development program, one of the few in the Southeast. The program has filled a void of professional real estate education in Alabama.

Modern Healthcare ranked Auburn University's Physicians Executive M.B.A. (PEMBA) program in the College of Business ninth in the nation among all degree programs for physician executives, according to the journal's May 2006 issue. Among M.B.A. programs tailored specifically for physicians, AU's program is ranked second.

Auburn's literary journal, the Southern Humanities Review, has been published at the university by members of the English faculty, graduate students in English, and the Southern Humanities Council since 1967. Auburn hosts the Encyclopedia of Alabama's editorial offices and servers and the Alabama Humanities Foundation holds copyright to the encyclopedia's original content.

== Student life ==
Undergraduate demographics as of fall 2023
Race and ethnicity	Total
White	83%
Black	4%
Hispanic	4%
Asian	3%
Two or more races	3%
International student	2%
Economic diversity
Low-income (Note: The percentage of students who received an income-based federal Pell grant intended for low-income students.)	13%
Affluent (Note: The percentage of students who are a part of the American middle class at the bare minimum.)	87%

=== Campus events ===
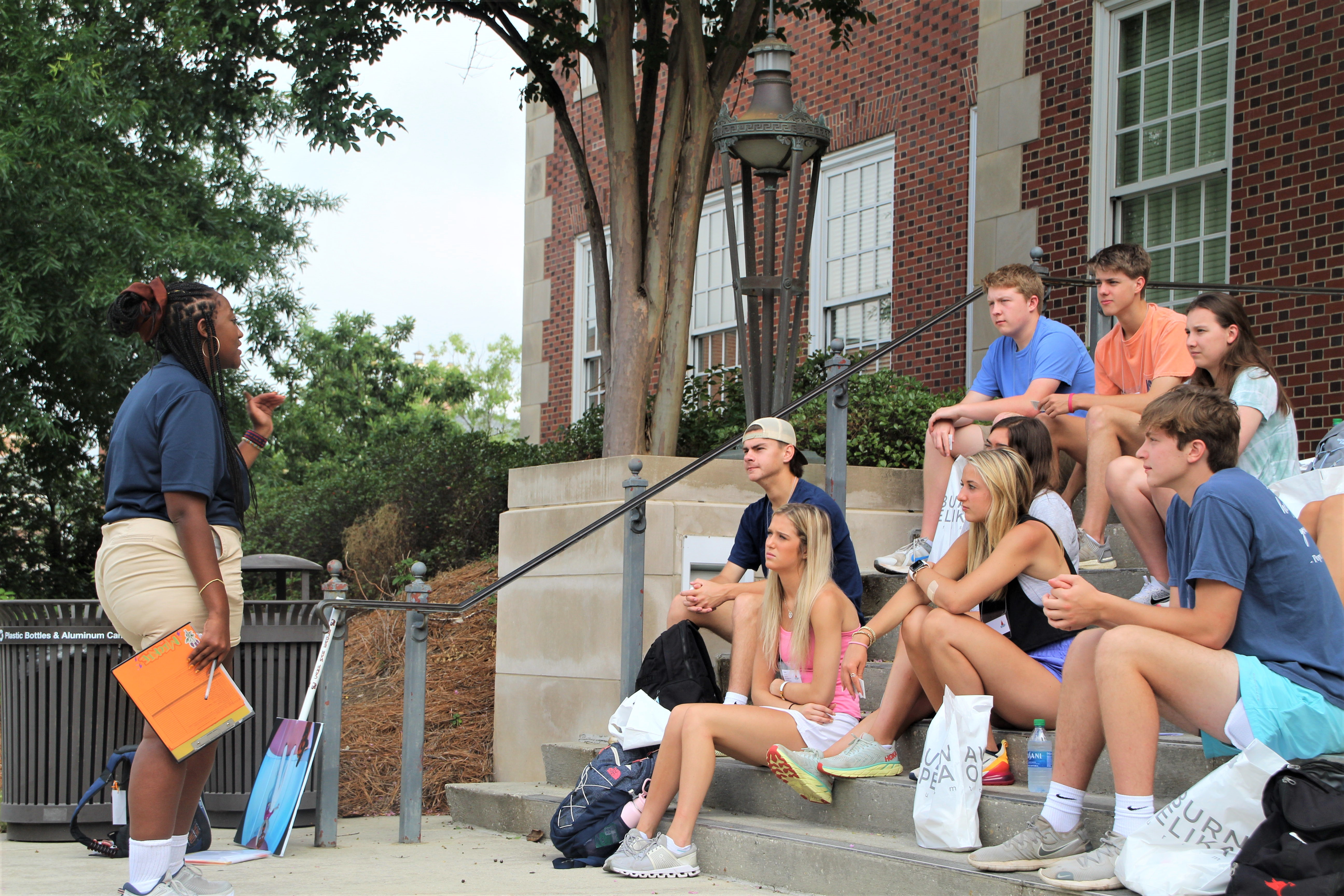
Auburn's 2021 "Camp War Eagle" summer orientation for first-time freshmen

In 2019, Auburn was ranked first by The Princeton Review's list of happiest students on college campuses thanks in part to its wide variety of campus activities and events.

Campus activities and events begin with orientation and training sessions for new Auburn students. Auburn offers two orientation programs, Camp War Eagle and Successfully Orienting Students. Camp War Eagle is offered to incoming freshmen and their guests, helping familiarize students with the orientation to college life and Auburn. Successfully Orienting Students is designed for college students transferring into Auburn from another academic institution. First-year Auburn students also have the opportunity to participate in seminars with other first-year students and learning communities.

Other prominent campus events and activities include the First 56 and Hey Day. First 56 is the series of programs coordinated by the University Program Council taking place over the first 56 days of the Fall semester period designed to welcome both new and returning students. Hey Day is one of Auburn's most longstanding traditions, dating back to World War II, where the entire campus community wears nametags and greet one another.

Only 11% of Auburn students qualify for a federal Pell grant, even though Alabama has one of the highest poverty rates in the United States. Less than 5% of the student population is Black, even though 30% of the college-age population in Alabama is Black.

=== Dining ===
In 2021, Auburn opened the $26 million Central Dining Hall spanning 48,000 square feet with capacity for more than 800 seats and eight different meal stations. Outside of the Central Dining Hall, Auburn students have many options including other dining halls in Foy Hall and The Village residential neighborhood. Students may also visit restaurant chains like Chick-fil-A and Starbucks in addition to locally owned and operated food trucks at various locations across campus.

All Auburn students have access to meal plans, accessible to use at all on-campus dining locations. Students may choose to purchase plans with meal swipes for access to campus dining dollars, or opt for a plan with more declining balance to use at standalone restaurants and food trucks, or a combination of both.

Campus dining utilizes the popular mobile food ordering application Grubhub.

Auburn campus dining is engaged in sustainability practices such as minimizing food waste and reducing food packaging, and campus dining also participates in a local campus community garden for both sustainability and freshness.

Auburn works at addressing and solving student food insecurity. All Auburn students have access to the Campus Food Pantry in the event students face food insecurity.

=== Housing ===
Auburn's initial campus master plan was designed by Frederick Law Olmsted Jr. in 1929. For most of the early history of Auburn, boarding houses and barracks made up most of the student housing. Even into the 1970s, boarding houses were still available in the community. It was not until the Great Depression that Auburn began to construct the first buildings on campus that were residence halls in the modern sense. As the university gradually shifted away from agricultural and military instruction to more of an academic institution, more and more dorms began to replace the barracks and boarding houses.

Auburn's on-campus student housing consists of 30 residence halls in nine residential neighborhoods, housing a total of 4,800 residents. On-campus residents are served by 79 resident assistants, 13 housing ambassadors and many other graduate assistants and full-time university employees.

- The Quad is the oldest of the five housing complexes, dating to the Great Depression projects begun by the Works Progress Administration and located in Central Campus. Comprising ten buildings split into the Upper and Lower Quads, the Quad houses undergraduate students. Eight of the buildings are coed by floor, the remaining two are female-only. The Quad is located in the center of campus and primarily consists of double-occupancy rooms connected to a bathroom.
- The Hill currently consists of six and houses mostly undergraduates. There are two high-rise, 6-story dormitories (Boyd and Sasnett), and all dorms are coed with gender-separated floors. The Hill residence halls are configured similarly to The Quad, primarily consisting of double-occupancy rooms connected to a bathroom.
- The Village was constructed in 2009 and consists eight four-story buildings to accommodate 1,500 residents. Three buildings in The Village house members of Auburn's Panhellenic sororities. Most Village rooms are designed as suites with four single bedrooms, two bathrooms and a furnished common living and dining area with a kitchenette.
- Cambridge Hall is a five-story residence hall at Auburn University housing 300 undergraduate students, located in close proximity to Rane Culinary Science Center currently under construction. Cambridge rooms are configured to be double occupancy rooms with open closets and a shared bathroom.
- South Donahue opened in 2013 and is a five-story residence hall located on the corner of South Donahue and West Samford, right next to the baseball stadium. Most South Donahue suites include two separate bedrooms and private bathrooms, also equipped with a shared living room and kitchenette. Each bedroom has a double-sized bed, and each suite comes fit with a mounted flat-screen TV and its own washer and dryer units.
- 160 Ross is a luxury apartment community designed to combine the benefits of off campus living and on-campus housing. 160 Ross rooms are configured to be four bedroom/four bathroom or two bedroom/two bathroom apartments with a wide array of amenities and benefits.

=== Health, wellness and recreation ===
Auburn's campus recreation center features a five-story cardio tower, one-third of a mile indoor running track, basketball courts, an outdoor leisure pool, cardio and fitness zones, a rock climbing wall, weight training areas and outdoor recreation spaces. Athletic Business named the 240,000 square foot facility as one of its 2014 Facilities of Merit.

Auburn's currently has more than 20 club sports, open to all Auburn University students without affiliation to the NCAA. The club sport programs range from sports like basketball and volleyball to clay shooting and water skiing. Auburn also offers Intramural Sports like flag football in a team setting.

Auburn students also have access to a wide array of wellness programs, including a fully functional on-campus Medical Clinic featuring 40 exam rooms, digitized x-rays and cutting edge lab equipment. The university's Student Counseling and Psychological Services office, fully accredited by the International Association of Counseling Services (IACS) to provide health counseling, is also housed within the Medical Clinic. The Medical Clinic is also home to a student pharmacy, a women's health center, a massage therapy center and a chiropractic care center.

=== Student clubs and organizations ===
Some organizations on campus housed within the university's Student Involvement office include the Student Government Association, University Program Council, LEAD Auburn Student Leadership Program, Black Student Union, International Student Organization and the Graduate Student Council. Auburn's Student Involvement office also houses a number of service organizations such as Auburn University Dream Makers, IMPACT Auburn, Beat Bama Food Drive and more.

The Auburn Plainsman is a student-run newspaper covering Auburn University and the Auburn community. The paper is the most decorated student publication, receiving more National Pacemaker Awards, handed out by the Associated Collegiate Press, than any other student news organization. As of 2021, The Auburn Plainsman is primarily an online publication, though some special editions are still carried out in print.

Other student media organizations include Eagle Eye TV station, WEGL 91.1 FM radio, The Circle literary magazine and the Glomerata yearbook.

More than 350 students are members of the Auburn University Marching Band, the 2004 recipient of the Sudler Intercollegiate Marching Band Trophy, the most prestigious collegiate marching band award. The band features all components of a traditional marching band in addition to a majorette, dance and flag line as well as the Tiger Eyes visual ensemble.

=== Greek life ===
Auburn's total Greek population is 9,800 members, or about 35% of all undergraduate students, as of Spring 2025.

Auburn's Greek system lagged behind most of the nation's public college Greek systems with full integration, the first African-American student to be initiated into a historically White sorority, happening in 2001. Integration of Auburn's historically White fraternities took place in the 1990s. Since the early 2000s, several non-White students have been initiated into historically White Greek organizations at Auburn every year. In 2018, an African-American student became the first person of color president of a historically White Greek organization on campus. Only Auburn's historically White fraternities have traditional Greek houses.

=== Student services and resources ===
Auburn students have access to a wide variety of resources for various needs and concerns. As it pertains to academics, students have access to college-specific academic advisors, peer tutoring study partners, supplemental instruction sessions and the Miller Writing Center. If needed, students may also request academic assistance through the Office of Accessibility to best accommodate their respective learning needs.

The Auburn Cares office assesses the needs of students in the event of a crisis, emergency or unexpected difficulty. The office guides students through such a crisis while helping connect them with appropriate resources, assistance and action plans.

The Veterans Resource Center serves all military-affiliated students at Auburn. The resource center connects student veterans with one another while providing them with additional opportunities and resources to successfully transition into the Auburn community.

== Athletics ==
Current Auburn Athletics logo

Auburn University's sports teams are known as the Tigers, and are a member of the NCAA at the Division I FBS level as well as being a member of the 16-member Southeastern Conference (SEC). "War Eagle" is the battle cry and greeting used by the Auburn Family (students, alumni, and fans). Auburn has won a total of 30 intercollegiate national championships (including 21 NCAA Championships), which includes nine football, eight men's swimming and diving, five women's swimming and diving, six equestrian, one women's outdoor track and field, and one men's golf. Auburn has also won a total of 70 Southeastern Conference championships, including 51 men's titles and 19 women's titles. Auburn's colors of orange and blue were chosen by George Petrie, Auburn's first football coach, based on those of his alma mater, the University of Virginia.

=== Football ===
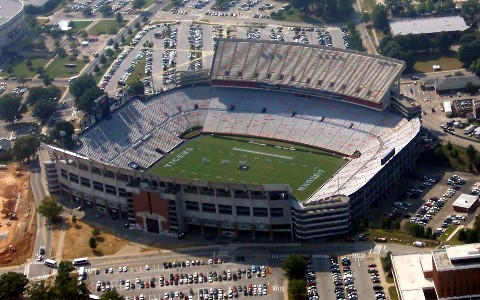
Jordan–Hare Stadium, 2005

Auburn played its first game in 1892 against the University of Georgia at Piedmont Park in Atlanta, starting what is currently the oldest college football rivalry in the Deep South. Auburn's first perfect season came in 1913, when the Tigers went 8–0, claiming a second SIAA conference championship and the first national championship in school history. The Tigers' first bowl appearance was in 1937 in the sixth Bacardi Bowl played in Havana, Cuba. AU football has won twelve SEC Conference Championships, and since the division of the conference in 1992, eight western division championships and six trips to the SEC Championship game. Auburn plays arch-rival Alabama each year in a game known as the Iron Bowl.

Three Auburn players, Pat Sullivan in 1971, Bo Jackson in 1985, and Cam Newton in 2010, have won the Heisman Trophy. The Trophy's namesake, John Heisman, coached at Auburn from 1895 until 1899. Auburn is the only school where Heisman coached (among others, Georgia Tech and Clemson) that has produced multiple Heisman Trophy winners. Auburn's Jordan–Hare Stadium has a capacity of 87,451 ranking as the ninth-largest on-campus stadium in the NCAA as of September 2006. Notable coaches of the team include George Petrie, John Heisman, Mike Donahue, Jack Meagher, Ralph "Shug" Jordan, Pat Dye, Terry Bowden, Tommy Tuberville, and Gene Chizik.

=== Swimming and diving ===
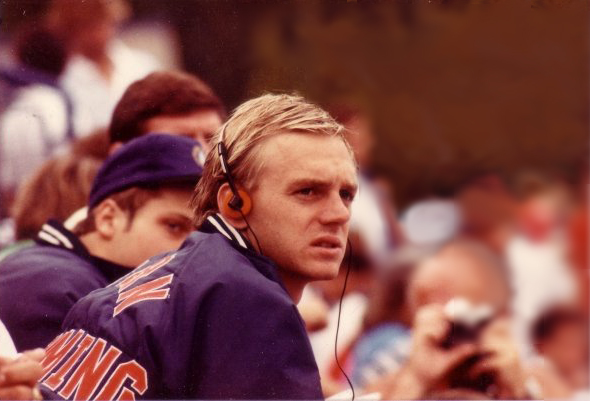
Rowdy Gaines preparing for a meet while swimming for Auburn

In the last decade under head coaches David Marsh, Richard Quick and co-head coach Brett Hawke, Auburn's swimming and diving program has become preeminent in the SEC and nationally, with consecutive NCAA championships for both the men and women in 2003 and 2004, then again in 2006 and 2007. Since 1982, only eight teams have claimed national championships in women's swimming and diving. Auburn and Georgia each won nine straight (five Auburn, four Georgia) between 1999 and 2007. The men won their fifth consecutive national title in 2007, and the women also won the national title, in their case for the second straight year. The Auburn women have now won five national championships in the last six years. As of 2009, the Auburn men have won the SEC Championship fifteen out of the last sixteen years, including the last thirteen in a row, and also won eight NCAA national championships (1997, 1999, 2003, 2004, 2005, 2006, 2007 and 2009). AU swimmers have represented the U.S. and several other countries in recent Olympic Games. Auburn's most famous men's swimmer is Olympic gold medalist Rowdy Gaines, and also Brazilian César Cielo Filho, bronze (100m freestyle) and gold medal (50m freestyle) at the 2008 Beijing Olympic Games. The most successful female Olympic swimmer is Kirsty Coventry (swimming for her home country of Zimbabwe) who won gold, silver, and bronze medals at the 2004 Summer Olympics in Athens, plus one gold and three silvers in Beijing. Coventry became president of the International Olympic Committee in 2025. While the football team is far more well known nationally and in the media, Auburn swimming and diving is the most dominant athletics program for the university.

=== Men's basketball ===
The Auburn men's basketball team has enjoyed off-and-on success over the years. Its best known player is Charles Barkley. Other professional basketball players from Auburn are John Mengelt, Rex Fredicks, Eddie Johnson, Mike Mitchell, Chuck Person, Chris Morris, Wesley Person, Chris Porter, Mamadou N'diaye, Jamison Brewer, Moochie Norris, Marquis Daniels, and Pat Burke.

=== Women's basketball ===
The Auburn University women's basketball team has been consistently competitive both nationally and within the SEC. Despite playing in the same conference as perennial powerhouse Tennessee and other competitive programs such as LSU, Georgia, and Vanderbilt, Auburn has won four regular season SEC championships and four SEC Tournament championships. AU has made sixteen appearances in the NCAA women's basketball tournament and only once, in their first appearance in 1982, have the Tigers lost in the first round. Auburn played in three consecutive national championship games from 1988 to 1990 and won the WNIT in 2003. When Coach Joe Ciampi retired at the end of the 2003–2004 season, Auburn hired former Purdue and U.S. National and Olympic team head coach, Nell Fortner. Standout former Auburn players include Ruthie Bolton, Vickie Orr, Carolyn Jones, Chantel Tremitiere, Lauretta Freeman, Monique Morehouse, and DeWanna Bonner.

=== Baseball ===
Auburn Baseball has won six SEC championships, three SEC Tournament championships, appeared in sixteen NCAA Regionals and reached the College World Series (CWS) four times. After a disappointing 2003–2004 season, former Auburn assistant coach Tom Slater was named head coach. He was replaced in 2008 by John Pawlowski. Samford Stadium-Hitchcock Field at Plainsman Park is considered one of the finest facilities in college baseball and has a seating capacity of 4,096, not including lawn areas. In addition to Bo Jackson, Auburn has supplied several other players to Major League Baseball, including Frank Thomas, Gregg Olson, Scott Sullivan, Tim Hudson, Mark Bellhorn, Jack Baker, Terry Leach, Josh Hancock, Gabe Gross, Steven Register, Trey Wingenter, David Ross and Josh Donaldson.

=== Women's golf ===
Auburn's women's golf team has risen to be extremely competitive in the NCAA in recent years. Since 1999, they hold an 854–167–13 (.826 win percentage) record. The team has been in five NCAA finals and finished second in 2002, then third in 2005. The program has a total of seven SEC Championships (1989, 1996, 2000, 2003, 2005, 2006, and 2009). The seven titles is third all time for women's golf. In October 2005, Auburn was named the #3 team nationally out of 229 total teams since 1999 by GolfWeek magazine. Auburn's highest finish in the NCAA tournament was a tie for second in 2002.

=== Track and field ===
The Auburn women's track and field team won its first national title in 2006 at the NCAA Outdoor Track and Field Championships, scoring 57 points to win over the University of Southern California, which finished second with 38.5 points. Auburn posted All-American performances in nine events, including two individual national champions and three second-place finishers, and broke two school records during the four-day event.

=== Equestrian ===
Auburn's equestrian team captured the 2006 national championship, the first equestrian national championship in school history. Senior Kelly Gottfried and junior Whitney Kimble posted team-high scores in their respective divisions as the Auburn equestrian team clinched the overall national championship at the 2006 Varsity Equestrian Championships at the EXPO/New Mexico State Fairgrounds in Albuquerque, New Mexico. In 2008, the Auburn equestrian team captured the 2008 Hunt Seat National Championship. Over fences riders finished 12–1–1 overall for the week. Auburn has also consistently been highly ranked in the Women's Intercollegiate Equestrian National Coaches Poll as well. The Auburn equestrian team most recently captured the 2019 national championship.

=== Club sports ===
At the conclusion of the 1980–1981 NCAA Wrestling season, Auburn University became the first SEC team to place Top 10 in the country. Coached by Ohio wrestling legend Tom Milkovich, Auburn claimed the SEC title en route to a historic season boasting three All-Americans and 6 NCAA qualifiers. However, with the emergence of Title IX and the decline of wrestling in the SEC, Auburn found itself without a varsity program after the 1980-81 season.

The Auburn University Rugby Football Club was founded in 1973. Auburn plays Division 1 college rugby in the Southeastern Collegiate Rugby Conference against traditional SEC rivals such as Alabama and Georgia. Auburn rugby is one of only two club sports at Auburn with an endowment fund, resulting in the university allocating additional resources to rugby.

== Traditions ==
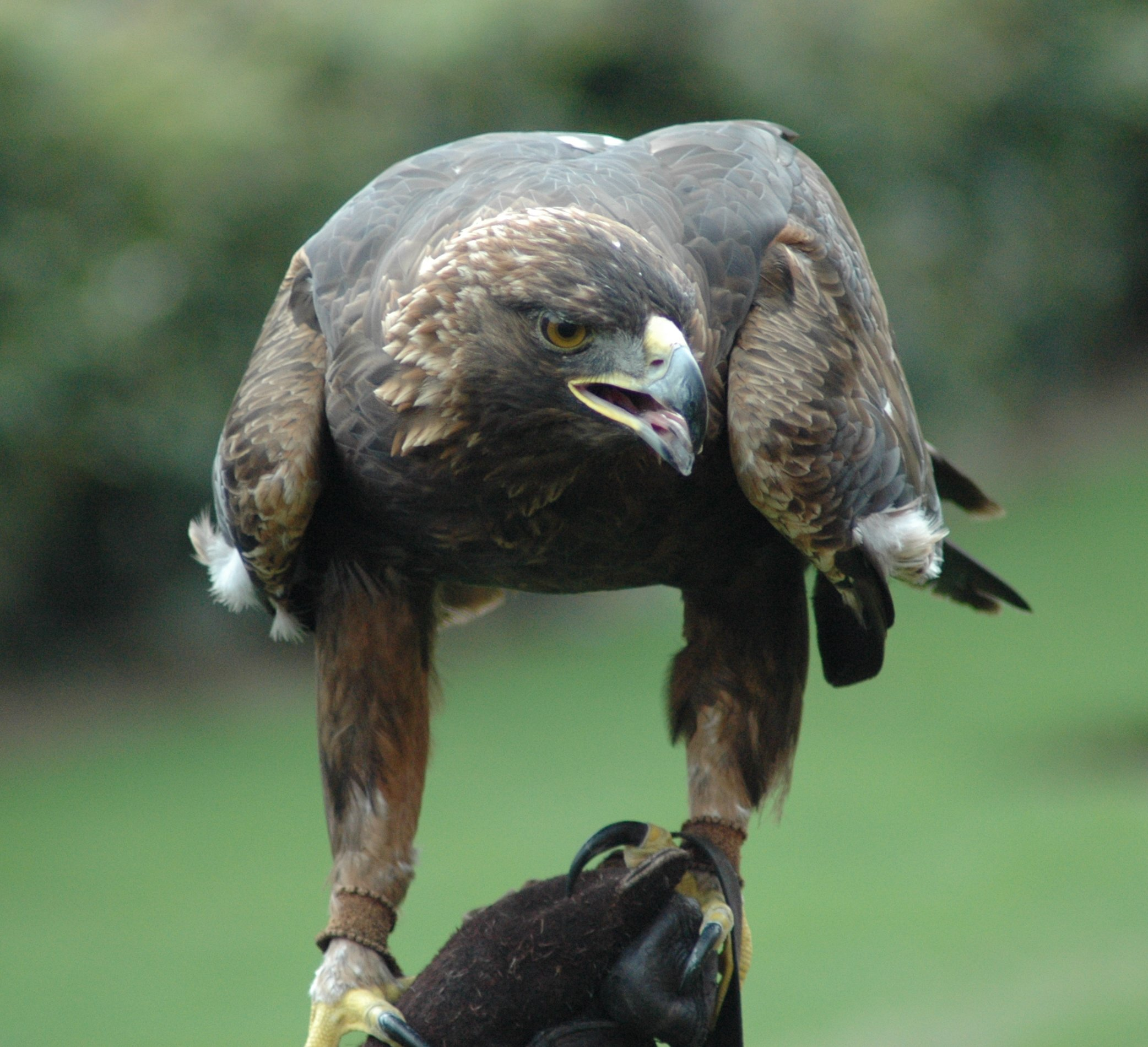
Nova, War Eagle VII

Auburn University has many traditions including a creed, an alma mater, a fight song, a battle cry, a mascot and several notable game-day traditions including an eagle flying over the football field. The official colors are:

Burnt orange	Navy blue

Auburn University's fight song, "War Eagle", was written in 1954 and 1955 by Robert Allen and Al Stillman. It was introduced at the beginning of the 1955 football season and served as the official fight song since.

=== Auburn's eagles ===
Auburn has currently two eagles in their flight program for educational initiatives. One of these educational programs is known as the pregame flight program where the eagle handlers set an eagle free before Auburn takes the field at Jordan–Hare Stadium. The eagle then proceeds to fly around the stadium and eventually land in the middle of the field. Auburn has two different species of eagle that have flown: the golden eagle and the bald eagle.

=== Aubie the Tiger ===
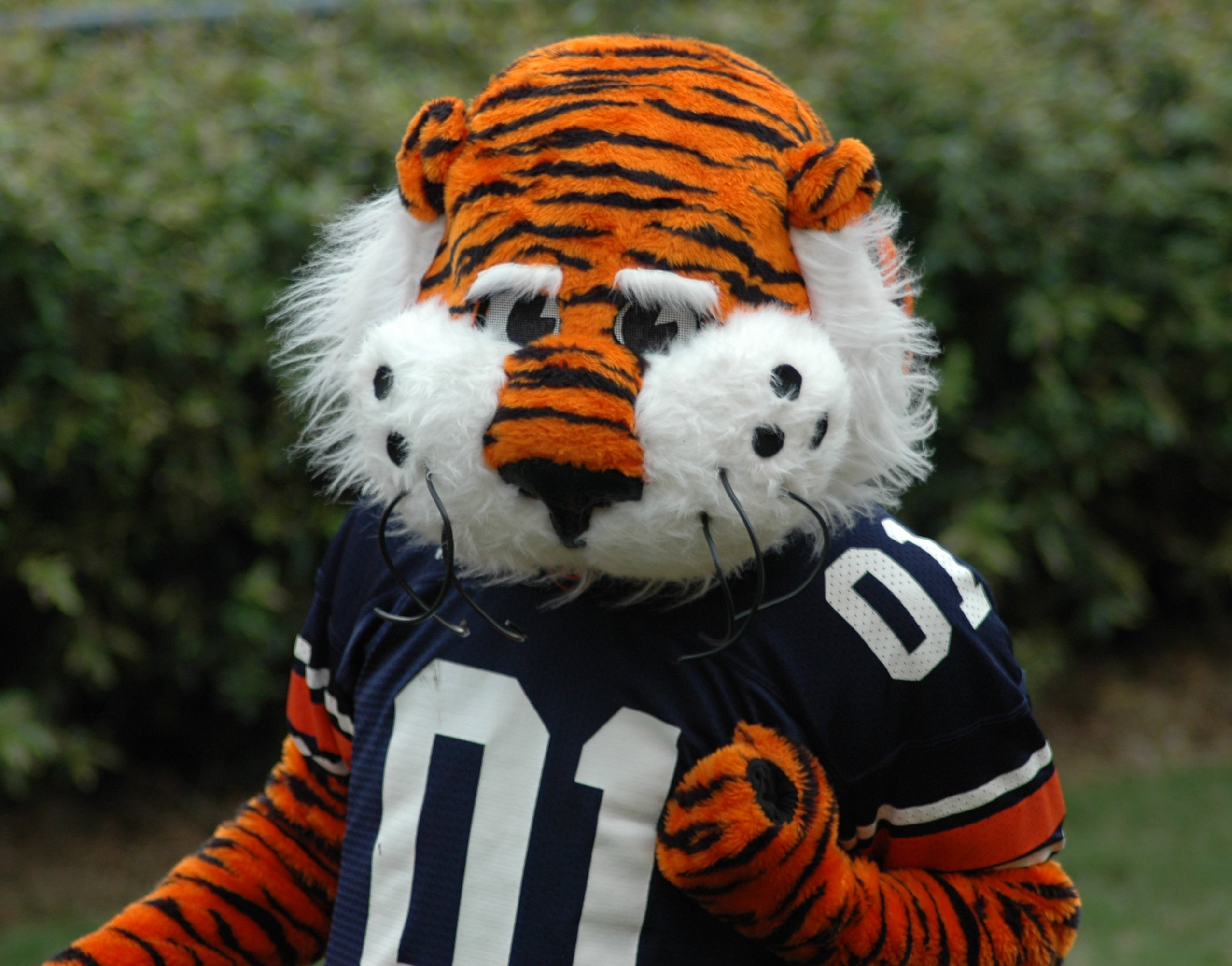
Aubie, the Auburn University mascot

Auburn's mascot, Aubie the tiger, has been around since 1959. He made his first appearance that year on the October 3 gameday football program versus Hardin-Simmons College. Aubie was the creation of Birmingham Post-Herald artist Phil Neel and was the focal point of Auburn's football programs for 18 years. Auburn Football experienced good luck while Aubie remained on the cover, ending with a 23–2–1 home record and 63–16–2 overall record while he was on the program cover. Aubie the tiger is still currently Auburn's official mascot and has won the most National Mascot titles in the contest's history, with ten.

=== War Eagle chant theories ===
During Auburn's game against Georgia in 1892, a civil war veteran in the stands brought his pet eagle that he found on a battleground during the war. The eagle during the game flew away from the soldier and began circling the field in the air. As all this went on, Auburn began marching down the field to eventually score the game-winning touchdown. At the end of the game, the eagle dove into the ground and subsequently died; however, the Auburn faithful took the eagle as an omen of success and coined the phrase "War Eagle" in turn.

During a pep rally in 1913, a cheerleader said that the team would have to fight the whole game because the game meant "war". At the same time of the rally, an eagle emblem fell on a student's military hat. When asked what it was, he yelled it was a "War Eagle".

During a game against the Carlisle Indian Team in 1914, Auburn attempted to single out Carlisle's toughest player, Bald Eagle. To tire him out, they began running the ball his way during every play, by saying "bald eagle", while in formation. The crowd mistook this and began yelling "War Eagle", instead, leading to Auburn's player, Lucy Hairston, to yell "War Eagle" at the end of the game, after he scored the game-winning touchdown.

After a battle, the Saxon warriors would yell "War Eagle", when the buzzards started to circle the battlefields. Some believe that Auburn coined its battle cry from this practice by the Saxons.

=== Toomer's Corner ===
The tradition of rolling Toomer's Corner on Auburn's campus after winning home and big away games is thought to have originated in the 1950s. The tradition is thought to have spawned from when the owner of Toomer's Drugs, Sheldon Toomer, would toss his receipt paper into the trees to signal an Auburn road victory. This iconic tradition was ranked by USA Today as the "Best Sports Tradition". In November 2010, following Auburn's victory over the University of Alabama in the Iron Bowl, an Alabama supporter poisoned the large live oak trees at Toomer's Corner using the herbicide Spike 80DF (tebuthiuron). The 83-85-year-old trees did not survive, and in the years since have been replaced several times (once following a fire in 2016) with the most recent replacements being planted in 2017.

== Notable alumni and faculty members ==
=== Alumni ===
Auburn has a diverse group of alumni, in many different industries. Some of its prominent alumni include Apple CEO Tim Cook, Wikipedia and Wikimedia Foundation co-founder Jimmy Wales, MacArthur Genius and 2004 AIA Gold Medal recipient Samuel Mockbee, National Security Agency and Commander of the U.S. Cyber Command Michael S. Rogers, Academy Award winner Octavia Spencer, NBA star Charles Barkley, NFL quarterback Cam Newton, NFL star and MLB player Bo Jackson, Alabama governor Kay Ivey, Tennessee governor Bill Lee, NASA astronauts Ken Mattingly, Jim Voss and Jan Davis, bestselling author James Redfield, Secretary of Defense Lloyd Austin, and world-renowned modernist architect Paul Rudolph. The president of the International Olympic Committee and Olympic champion Kirsty Coventry attended Auburn.

== See also ==
- Auburn University Chapel
- Donald E. Davis Arboretum
- Luther Duncan
- List of forestry universities and colleges
