= Food insecurity among college students in the United States =

Hunger among American college students

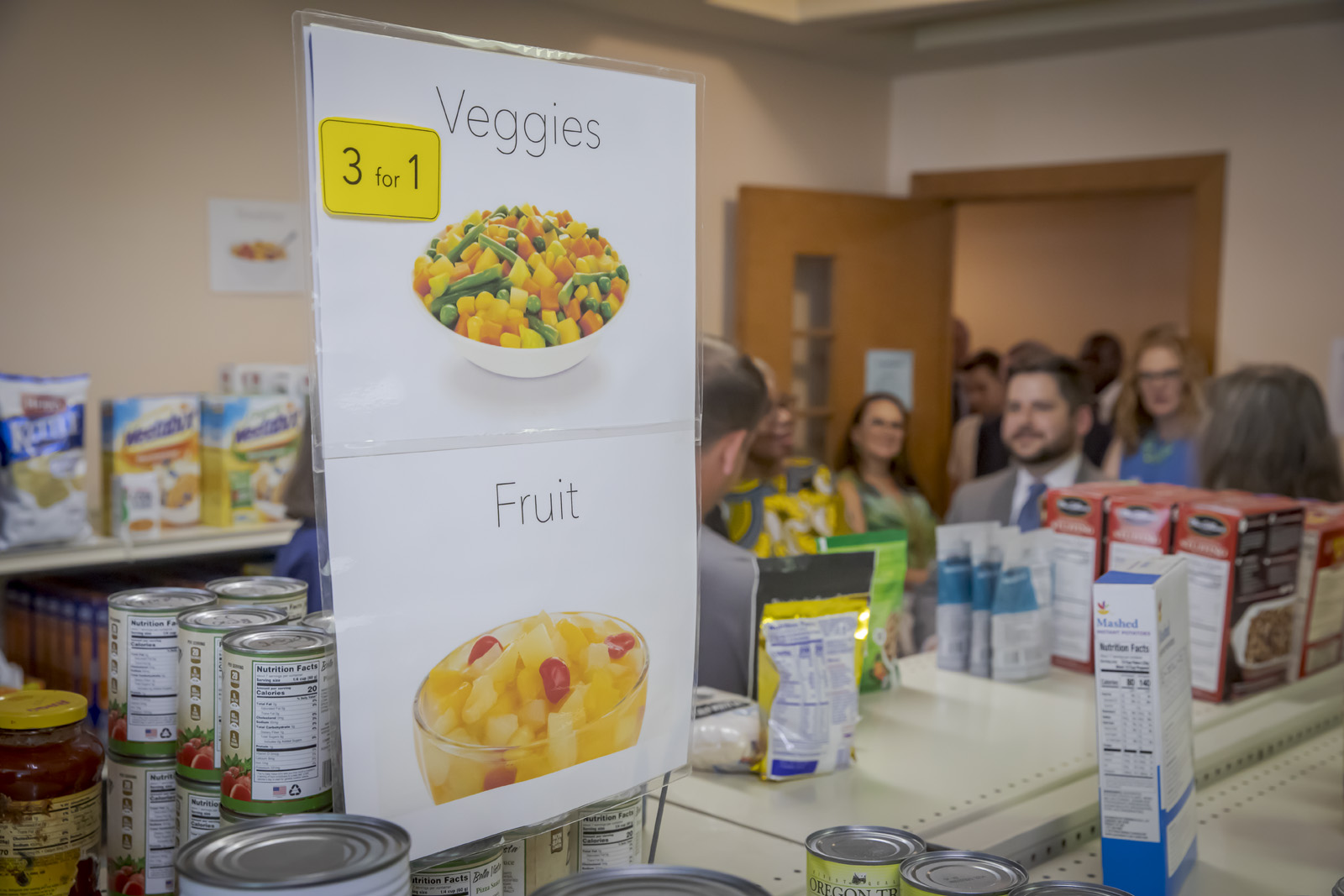
A free grocery service at Millersville University, launched to tackle food insecurity among students

Food insecurity is an issue affecting many American college students. While hunger in the United States affects all age groups, food insecurity seems to be especially prevalent among students. Studies have found that students of color are disproportionately affected. Students are uniquely affected by food insecurity, as this period of time is credited as, most likely, one's first time living away from home. The rising cost of education is another driver of food insecurity among students. Although student food insecurity is not usually discussed in terms of famine, it is part of the broader study of hunger and access to adequate food. Experiencing a period of chronic hunger can impact a student's mental health, and can lead to lower academic performance. Measures taken to alleviate hunger among students includes the establishment of food pantries in several US universities.

== Causes ==
Students tend to not have the means to afford items, especially first year students. They are "uniquely" vulnerable to food insecurity as they transition from a state of dependency (often being looked after by parents) to autonomy. Additionally, the costs involved with higher education have been rising, in some cases faster than peoples ability to pay.

When entering college, many students are leaving their homes and managing their own finances for the very first time in their lives. Depending on where they go to school, there may be limited access to affordable and nutritious food, such as in food deserts, making students particularly vulnerable to food insecurity. Students are often forced to choose between expensive textbooks and school materials and food, leaving many students hungry. Hunger can distract students from focusing, leading to decreased academic performance, longer time than usual to graduate, and higher rates of depression. Furthermore, familial financial hardship, ever-rising costs of tuition and housing, and lack of sufficient financial aid –which can be attributed to recent major cuts in states’ budgets for public universities and lack of federal aid –have made food insecurity an increasingly common experience among college students. In fact, a study on hunger in US colleges done at the University of California took data from 2006 to 2016 showed that 40% of students experienced food insecurity.

According to a study done by sociologist Katharine Broton at the University of Massachusetts Boston, 27% of students had skipped meals because of food insecurity and 6% did not eat for 1 to 2 days because of limitations such as being in a food desert.

A study done by researcher Danielle Gallegods used the USDA Food Security Module (FFSM) on 810 students at the Metropolitan University in Brisbane, Australia. The findings revealed that one out of every four students experiences food insecurity, which is twice the previously reported rate for university students and five times that of the general population. Factors contributing to food insecurity included low income, reliance on government aid, and housing accommodations. Students from food- insecure households were twice as likely to rate their overall health as fair or poor and three times as likely to have to postpone their studies due to financial constraints. Additionally, at least 80% of these students reported that their academic performance was affected.

According to a study done by researcher Jaapna Dhillion, L. Katrina Diaz Rosa, Kaitlyn J. Aldaz, and their peers at the University of California, student’s perceptions of available food in the area caused them to have a higher risk of malnutrition and bad eating habits.

Historic injustices based on racial categories have led to students of color having the less resources as their peers. Government officials targeted low-income and multiethnic communities as locations of toxic waste facilities, further labeling the community as undesirable and making it harder for residents to obtain greater opportunities. Many of the students in community colleges that are food insecure have experienced racial inequality, lack of healthcare and social services, inadequate housing poverty and other economic barriers. All of the obstacles prevent students from going to a private institution that has more alternatives to combating food insecurity. The demographics of community colleges play a major role in the high percentages of students facing food scarcity.

== Prevalence ==
Food insecurity prevalence was found to be 43.5% in a systematic review of food insecurity among US students in higher education. This prevalence of food insecurity is over twice as high as that reported in United States national households. Data have been collected to estimate prevalence both nationally as well as at specific institutions (two and four year colleges). For example, an Oregon university reported that 59% of their college students experienced food insecurity. where as in a correlational study conducted at the University of Hawaii at Manoa found that 21-24% of their undergraduate students were food-insecure or at risk of food insecurity. Data from a large southwestern university show that 32% of college freshmen, who lived in residence halls, self-reported inconsistent access to food in the past month. According to a 2011 survey of the City University of New York (CUNY) undergraduates, about two in five students reported being food insecure.

=== Demographics ===
A study done by professor of Public Health and author Nicholas Freudenberg examines the demographics of students who may be more likely to be affected by food insecurity. It's been found in a study conducted at the City University of New York that students of color are more likely to be affected by food insecurities. Researchers believe that growing rates of food insecurity in college students are due to an increasing population of low-income college students, higher tuition and insufficient financial assistance. According to a correlational study examining the undergraduate student population from universities in Illinois, African American students were more likely to report being very-low food secure compared to other racial groups. Similarly, the aforementioned study from the University of Hawaii at Manoa found that their undergraduate students, who identified as Hawaiians, Pacific Islanders, Filipinos, and mixed-race, were more likely to be at increased risk of food insecurity compared to Japanese students. In the City University of New York (CUNY), Black and Latino students were 1.5 times more likely to experience food insecurity than White and Asian students. Being a first generation student is another demographic that has been related to increased risk of food insecurity. Other demographics studied at the University of Alabama that have been found to increase risk of food insecurity in college students include receiving financial aid, being financially independent, and being employed. Researchers have speculated that students who live at home with their family are less likely to be food insecure, due to spending less on housing expenditures.

A study done by policy studies professor and president of California State University, Sacramento, J. Luke Wood, found that for White and Asian students, having a low income (defined as $30,000 or less) was a notable factor associated with food insecurity, moreover, white students within this income bracket had an 82% higher likelihood of experiencing food insecurity and Asian students had a 158% higher likelihood. Contrastingly, income was not found to be a big indicator of food insecurity in Black, Latino and multiethnic students. The study additionally concluded that community colleges were far more likely to have a higher percentage of students experiencing food insecurity. Community colleges have a higher percentage of low-income students and students of color.

== Effects ==
There have been multiple studies regarding the effects that University food deserts have on students. A study conducted by researchers Jaapna Dhillion, L. Katrina Diaz Rios, Kaitlyn J. Aldaz, and their peers, looked into the perception of first-year minority students attending a school in a food desert at the University of California. The aim of the study was to see how the eating habits of the students were affected by their understanding of healthy food access. They found that students expressed they had trouble with the adequacy, meaning variety and quality, acceptability with their familiarity and preferences, affordability and accessibility. The study shows that students were unable to have access to healthy, affordable meals, leaving them with limited options.

Another study was conducted at the University of Alabama by sociologist and author Katharine Broton discusses full time returning students and their food security. 14% of students surveyed expressed that they had low or very low food security and an additional 20% had marginal food security. The scale that was identified for the specific study showed that marginal food security included anxiety over food sufficiency and shortage of food, low food security had reports of reduced quality, variety, or desirability of diet, and very low food security which showed “reports of multiple indications of disrupted eating patterns and reduced food intake”.

=== Mental health ===
College students struggling with access to food are more likely to experience issues with mental health. According to a correlational study examining college freshmen living in residence halls from a large southwestern university, students who were food-insecure, were more likely to self-report higher levels of depression and anxiety, compared to food-secure students. When there isn’t enough food in the body for an extended period amount of time, the student would become fatigued and could experience anxiety, interfering with their concentration in class. It could also lead to lower brain function and can cause emotional distress. When a student is food-insecure, they struggle to have enough money to buy food, leading them to have to settle with unhealthy and improper meals because it’s cheaper. But these meals would probably be highly processed foods which would not only make them physically sick after being consumed for a prolonged amount of time but affect them mentally too.

=== Academic performance ===
When a student is unable to focus or has to worry about when their next meal will be or if they have enough money to last for the rest of the week, their academic performance will decline. Food insecurity increases the odds of being in the lower 10% GPA and lower odds of being in the upper 10% GPA. According to a 2018 study on young adults attending an Appalachian University, the GPA of a food-secure student would be on average of 3.51, while a food-insecure student would be 3.33. This could be because the student who has the average lower GPA must spend money on other items or rent instead of buying food and it affects them mentally and physically. The food-insecure students might have to work multiple part-time jobs and not have time to study, unlike the students who are food-secure and have a support system. Additionally, nutrition would affect a student’s thinking skills, behavior, and health. Inadequate nutrients will infer with the student’s learning process, and they will be unable to concentrate, which will affect their academic performance. On top of the direct impacts of malnutrition and associated illness on learning there are numerous indirect effects as well. A study was conducted by professor Rita Bakan to look at the direct effects malnutrition has on learning and lots of side effects were found. The study was done on rats and showed that food restriction resulted in an interference with cell division and cellular growth patterns and they are left with a deficit in the number of cells in all organs. It’s frequently noted that malnourished individuals tend to display apathy, irritability, and have difficulty paying attention. Despite the study was conducted on rats, the same result would occur in humans.

== Responses ==
=== Supplemental Nutritional Assistance Program (SNAP) ===
Colleges have taken steps to address the issue of food insecurity on their campuses –such as food pantries and Supplemental Nutritional Assistance Program (SNAP) application assistance –though commentators have suggested more needs to be done. The Supplemental Nutritional Assistance Program (SNAP) policies excludes many college students from receiving benefits. SNAP federal policies disproportionately impacts young people and people of color. The Supplemental Nutritional Assistance Program (SNAP) policies excludes many college students from receiving benefits. This is because when SNAP was first introduced, college students were not the main focus of the program as they were typically from white, middle-class families, under the care of their parents and were young high school graduates without dependents to provide for. To prevent the system and the benefits from being abused, students were excluded from enrolling in SNAP.

A study done by research scientist Rachel Ross at the University of Washington revealed that the student’s lack of use of the SNAP program stem from a few reasons; uncertainty regarding SNAP eligibility criteria, dissatisfaction with the administrative complexities of applying for Snap assistance, fear regarding immigration status, the perception that their level of need does not meet the requirements and embarrassment from seeking aid and support. The perceptions of students may be misinformed, but colleges have started to combat this; at Cal State-East Bay, work-study students in the library have received training to assist peers in signing up for SNAP and other food aid that might be available.

A study conducted by researcher Quin Moore at Pacific University discovered that overall, the students who utilized SNAP’s benefits noticed improvements in their diets. Students in the study expressed that with SNAP they have gained more energy and possess the ability to perform better academically.

=== Food pantries ===
Researchers have suggested that college campuses examine available and accessible food-related resources to help alleviate students’ food insecurity. In 2012, the College and University Food Bank Alliance (CUFBA) identified over 70 campuses where food pantries had been implemented or were under development.

UC Berkeley operates a largely student-run food pantry, which opened in 2014 and is located in the lower level of the Martin Luther King Jr. Student Union. It sources food through the Alameda County Community Food Bank, Berkeley Student Farms, Berkeley Dining, the Berkeley Food Network, local donations, and purchases. Enrolled students may visit once per week using their student identification, and items are scanned at checkout to maintain the pantry's inventory. The pantry also refers students to CalFresh, California's food-assistance program; staff have described it as an emergency support rather than a solution to the underlying causes of student food insecurity, which they attribute to financial aid being insufficient.

Research presented at the American Psychological Association has found that food-insecure students are more likely to fail assignments and exams, withdraw from courses, and earn lower grade point averages than their peers.

While food pantries can provide urgent, short-term resources, they are not a sustainable, long-term solution for students. College food pantries are usually managed by volunteers and have limited budgets and resources; as a result, they do not always have nutritious food available. Furthermore, although many students are aware of these campus pantries, some may be reluctant to actually use this resource because of the stigma attached to them. A studied showed that on campuses with food pantries, on average, only about half of the student population know of the pantry and only about one fourth of food-insecure students use the pantry.

=== Community Assistance Programs ===
Community based assistance programs, like food pantries, can cater to a large number of students with minimal effort. With the ability to be operated by a group of students, faculty, and staff volunteers, they can obtain materials and aid from a multitude of organizations in the community and within the school.

=== Food Drives ===
Continuous or weekly food drives aid in combating food insecurity on college campuses. Donations from local churches, organizations and farms provide nutritious food in an accessible manner. Food banks and drives address food insecurity, however a study on food banks done by the Journal of Community Health shows they may not always provide a sufficient supply of nutrient-rich foods. The study also found that they improve overall food security when the correct resources are provided, they have access to perishable food groups, and they effectively address the specific needs of the community.

A study done by anthropologist Nicole D Peterson at the University of North Carolina looked into the barriers of food security on college campuses. 60% of the students surveyed were food insecure to some degree and looked for alternatives on campus, such as the local churches’ food drives. Food drives were appealing because financial limitations were found to be one of the main aspects contributing to food insecurity on campus so students looked for alternatives free of cost.

=== Community and College-based Farming Initiatives ===
Community and college-based farming initiatives work to link universities with nearby agricultural production and enhancing meal quality and nutrition. Healthy and fresh foods are collected to provide students and faculty with convenient and affordable meal options in dining halls, restaurants, events and any other food provider on campus. Some programs have classes and lessons in nutrition and eating a balanced diet available for those who are interested. Journalist Diane Harris explains that “The goal of these set of FTI {farm-to-institution} activities is to provide a tangible connection between food and its production and, in turn, highlight the freshness and quality of local food as a means of stimulating consumption of healthy foods, including fruits and vegetables.” Students are given the opportunity to work on these farming initiatives and the food is then available to those who may need it on campus through food pantries, farmers markets, and dining halls. Nonprofit organizations, both local and national, play a critical role in addressing college hunger. These organizations provide a range of basic needs support to college students experiencing food insecurity. Examples include initiatives such as food banks, gleaning agencies, food rescue initiatives, basic needs programs such as Student LunchBox, and other community-based efforts dedicated to combating hunger among college students.

== Research ==
=== Food Prescription Programs ===
Food prescription programs have shown to increase access to nutritious foods in communities at risk for food insecurity. On college campuses, though there are dining halls present, there is always the looming risk of food insecurity present to low-income students. These programs help meet the needs of individuals and families experiencing food insecurity and diet-related health problems by making fruit and vegetables more readily available to communities in need. A 2023 study" Bringing a Produce Rx Program to a College Student Population" stated "low food security in college student populations is a growing concern that negatively affects physical and mental health. Fruit and vegetables prescription programs are frequently used in food-scarce family populations, but not college populations." In the population that utilizes food prescription programs, a qualitative study by the CDC analyzed the perspectives of healthcare staff on predictors of success in a food prescription program in Houston, Texas. It found that coordinated patient care (recognition of the value of establishing consistent communication channels between clinics and patients) within and between organizations is a notable factor in implementing an effective and standardized partnership-based food prescription program. It also concluded that "careful planning of collaboration among clinics, food banks, and food prescription programs could promote patient participation to improve health outcomes and reduce food insecurity". This goes to say that after more research is completed on this subject, Food prescription programs may become an effective response in combatting food insecurity on college campuses.

== See also ==
- Economic issues in the United States
- Feeding America
- The Hunger Project
- United States Senate Select Committee on Nutrition and Human Needs
