= Samford Hall =

Building on the Auburn University campus

William J. Samford Hall
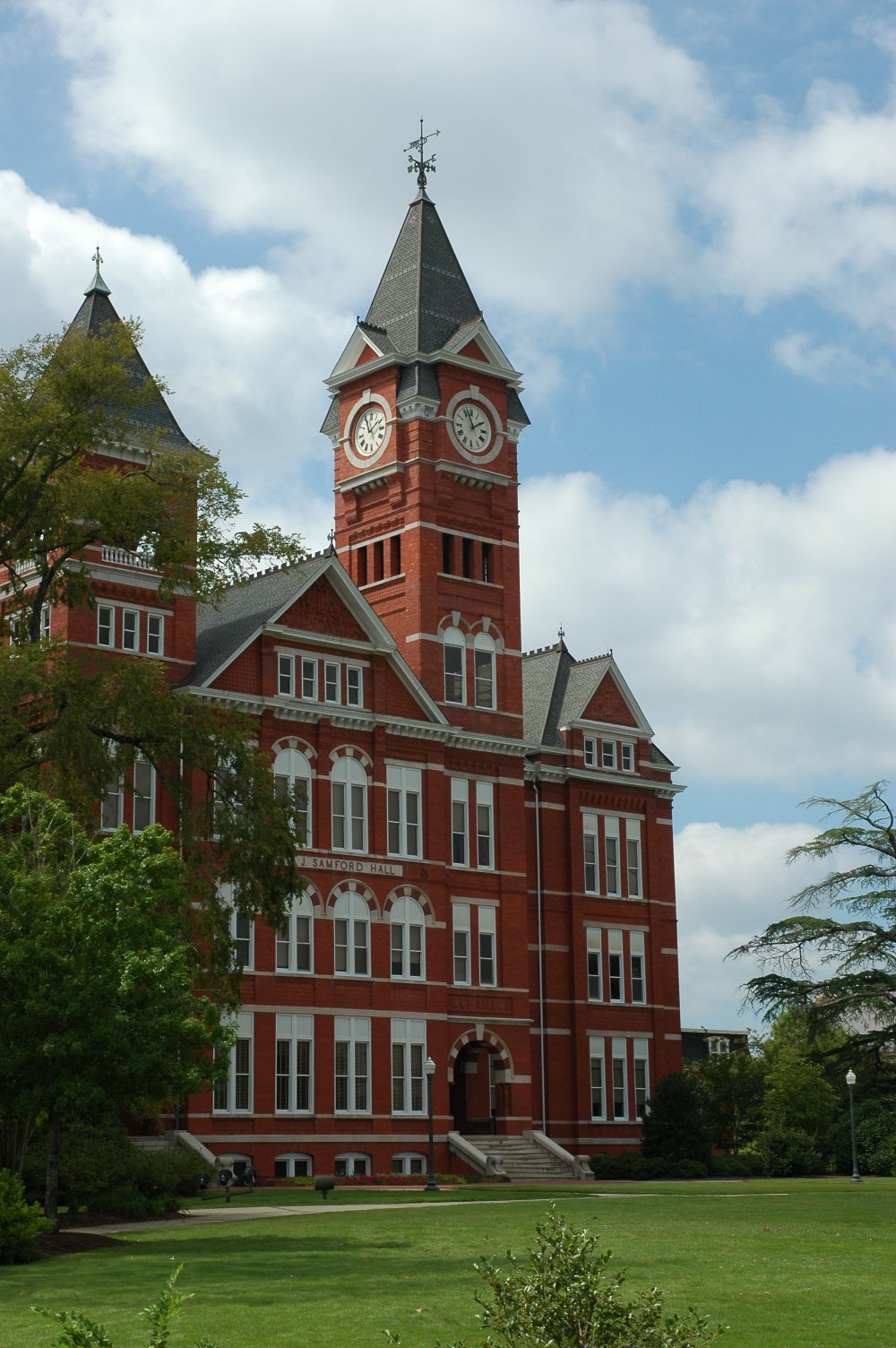

General information
- Location: Auburn, Alabama
- Coordinates: 32.604738°N 85.482736°W
- Completed: 1888
- Owner: Auburn University

Height
- Antenna spire: 176 ft (54 m)
- Roof: 154 ft (47 m)

Technical details
- Floor count: 4
- Floor area: 49,376 sq ft (4,587.2 m^{2})

Design and construction
- Architect(s): Bruce and Morgan
- Main contractor: James Smith

William J. Samford Hall is a structure on the campus of Auburn University in Auburn, Alabama. It is an icon of Auburn University and houses the school's administration. The building is named for William J. Samford, the Governor of Alabama from 1900 to 1901.

== History ==
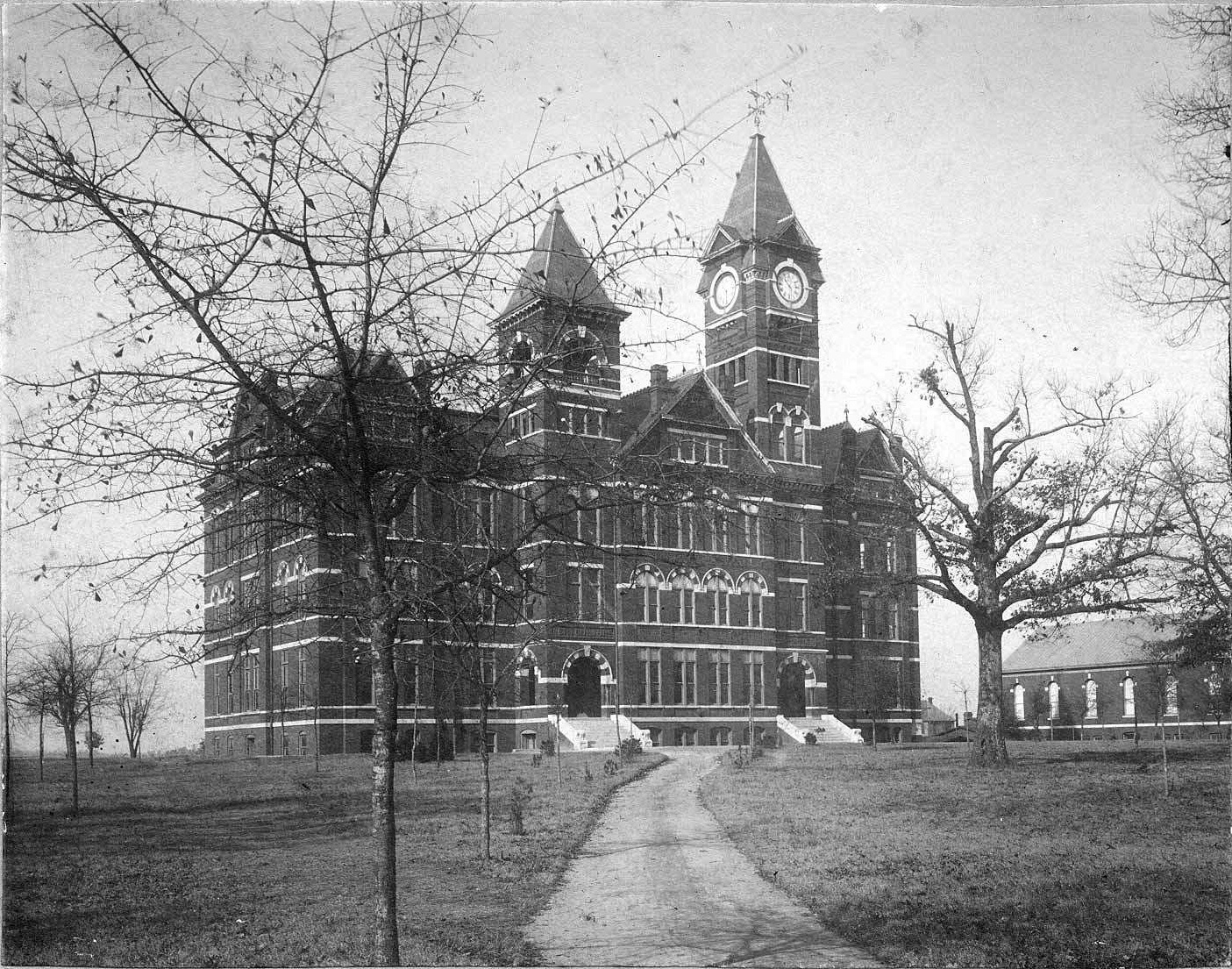
Samford Hall in the 1890s

When Auburn University (as East Alabama Male College) opened in 1859, classes were held in a structure named "Old Main" on the current site of Samford Hall. On June 24, 1887, Old Main was destroyed by fire. The following year, Samford Hall (then simply known as the "Main Building") was constructed, using, in part, bricks salvaged from the ruins of Old Main. The design of Samford Hall roughly mirrored that of Old Main, except that Samford Hall had two main entrances instead of Old Main's one, and on Samford one of the two flanking towers was considerably taller and was constructed to contain a clock. In 1889, a clockworks and bell were added to the taller tower.

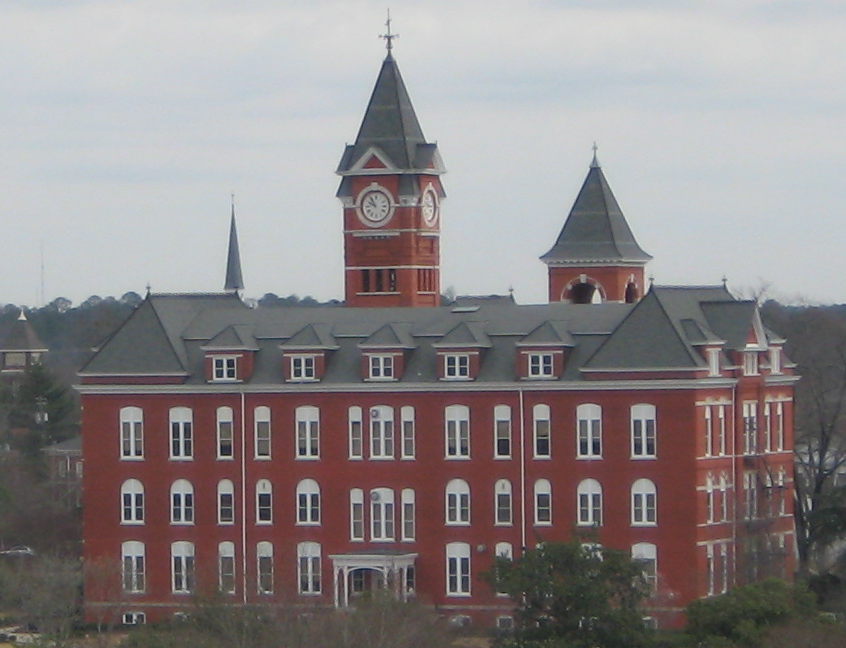
Rear side of Samford Hall

Through the late 19th century, Samford Hall was the college's main classroom building and contained the library. In May 1929, the building was officially named for William J. Samford. In 1941, the tower's mechanical clock was converted to run on electricity, and in 1977, a carillon was added. Samford Hall underwent major renovations in 1971, and the original clockworks were replaced in 1995. Today, Samford Hall houses the school's administration, accounting, planning, and public relations offices.

== Clock tower ==
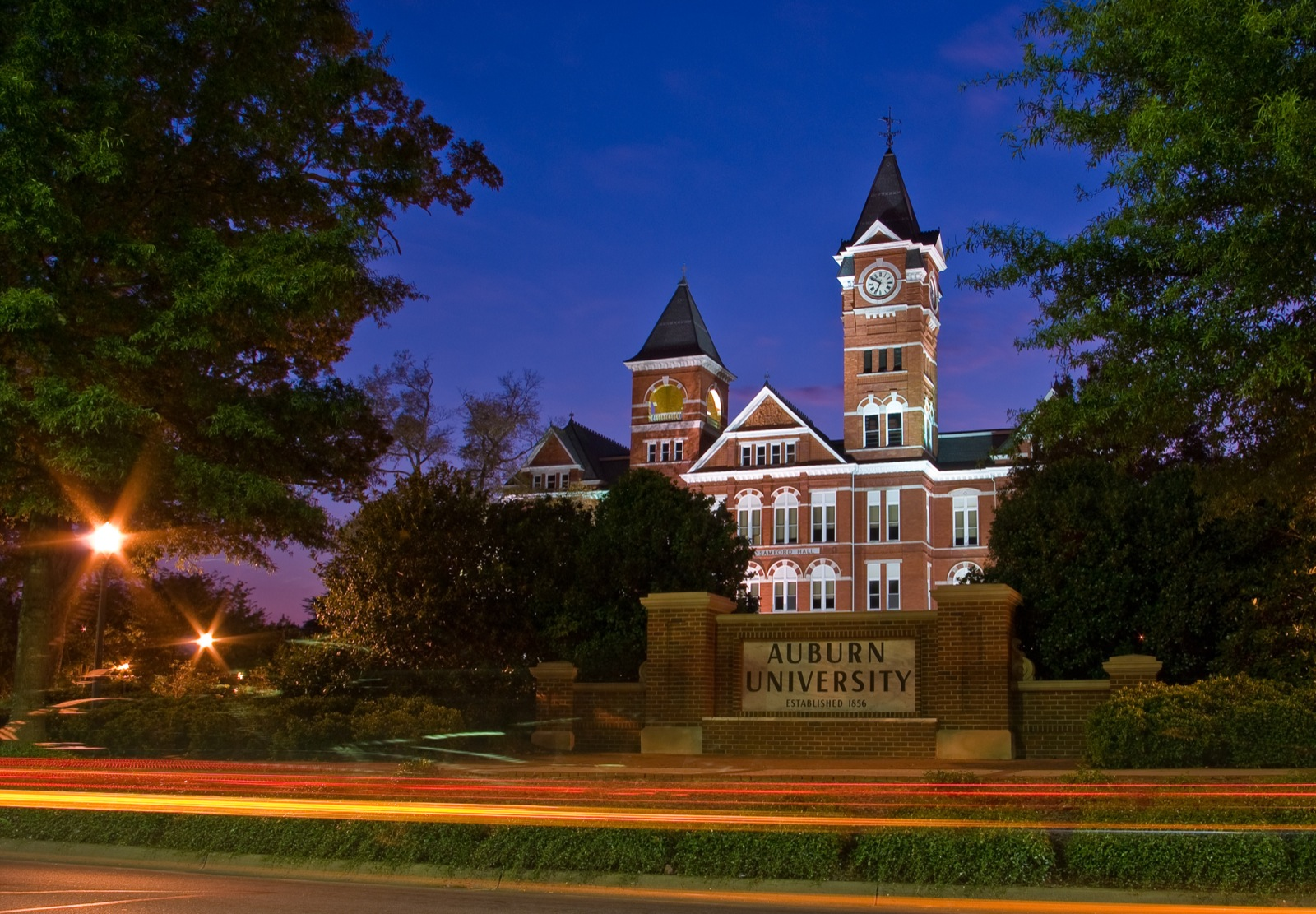
Samford Hall at night

Samford Hall's clock tower is the most recognized part of the building. The original clockworks were built by the Seth Thomas Clock Company of Thomaston, Connecticut. These clockworks were replaced in 1995 by a clock and electronic carillon made by the Verdin Company of Cincinnati, Ohio. A portion of the original clockworks and an original clockface are on display in the reception area of Samford Hall. The Samford Hall carillon plays the Westminster Chimes on the quarter-hour, and plays the Auburn University fight song, "War Eagle", a few seconds after 12:00 noon.

According to a University legend, students once led a cow up the tower stairs as a prank.

== Historic District ==
Samford Hall is part of the Auburn University Historic District.
