= Bee Hive, Alabama =

Bee Hive
- Unincorporated community
- Motto: Lets go!
- Location within Alabama Location within the United States
- Coordinates: 32°33′13″N 85°34′41″W
- Country: United States
- State: Alabama
- County: Lee

Government
- Elevation: 489 ft (149 m)

Population (2000)
  - Total: 780
- Time zone: UTC-6 (CST)
  - Summer (DST): UTC-6 (EDT)
- GNIS feature ID: 164022

Bee Hive, also spelled Beehive, is an unincorporated community in Lee County, Alabama, United States. It is part of the Columbus, Georgia-Alabama Metropolitan Area. Originally named for an apiary located along Wire Road near the Macon County line, the Bee Hive community now lies near the southwestern periphery of Auburn's city limits. It is the birthplace of James D. Edmondson. A post office operated under the name Beehive from 1896 to 1902.
