= Auburn High School (Alabama) =

Public high school in Auburn, Alabama, United States

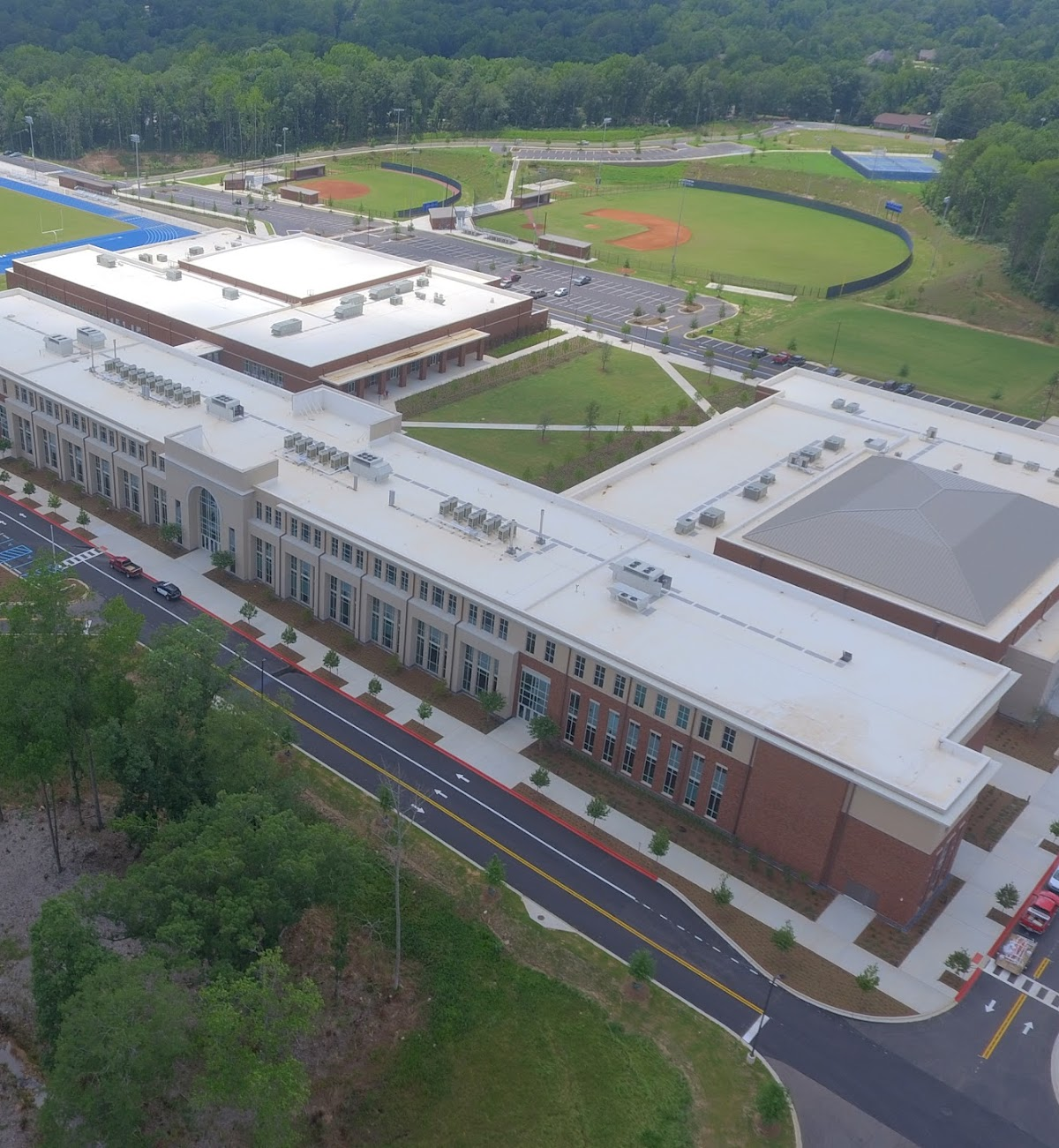
- Full view of the Auburn High School campus

Location
- 1701 E Samford Ave; Auburn, Alabama 36830; United States; 32°36′13″N 85°26′50″W

Information
- School type: Public
- Established: 1837 (189 years ago)
- School district: Auburn City Schools
- CEEB code: 010220
- NCES School ID: 010021000036
- Principal: Gregory D. Moore
- Teaching staff: 125.00 (on an FTE basis)
- Grades: 10–12
- Enrollment: 2,163 (2023–2024)
- Student to teacher ratio: 17.30
- Campus: City: small
- Colors: Royal blue and white
- Athletics: Auburn High School Tigers
- Nickname: Tigers
- Website: ahs.auburnschools.org

Auburn High School is a public high school in Auburn, Alabama, United States. It is the only high school in the Auburn City School District. Auburn High offers technical, academic, and International Baccalaureate programs, as well as joint enrollment with Southern Union State Community College and Auburn University. Auburn High School is accredited by the Southern Association of Colleges and Schools.

Founded in 1837 as Auburn Academy, Auburn High School is the oldest public secondary school in Alabama, and is the fifth-oldest extant public high school in the American South. From 1852 through 1885, the school was known as the Auburn (Masonic) Female College, offering secondary and, prior to 1870, collegiate degrees. From 1892 through 1908, the school was named the Auburn Female Institute, providing collegiate programs equivalent to an associate degree. Auburn High became Lee County's flagship high school in 1914 as Lee County High School, and gained its present name, Auburn High School, in 1956. The school moved to its current campus in 2017.

Auburn High was ranked the 28th best non-magnet public high school and 77th best public high school in the United States by Newsweek in May 2006, and the second best educational value in the Southeastern United States by SchoolMatch, as reported in The Wall Street Journal. Auburn High School averages seven National Merit finalists a year, and has scored among the top five percent of Alabama high schools on statewide standardized tests each year since testing began in 1995. Auburn High's varsity sporting teams have won 40 team state championships, and the Auburn High School Band has been rated one of the top high school concert band programs in the United States, winning the John Philip Sousa Foundation's Sudler Flag of Honor in 1987. Auburn High School has been competing in Science Olympiad since 2000, and has represented the state of Alabama at the national level every year since 2014.

== Academics ==
=== Profile ===
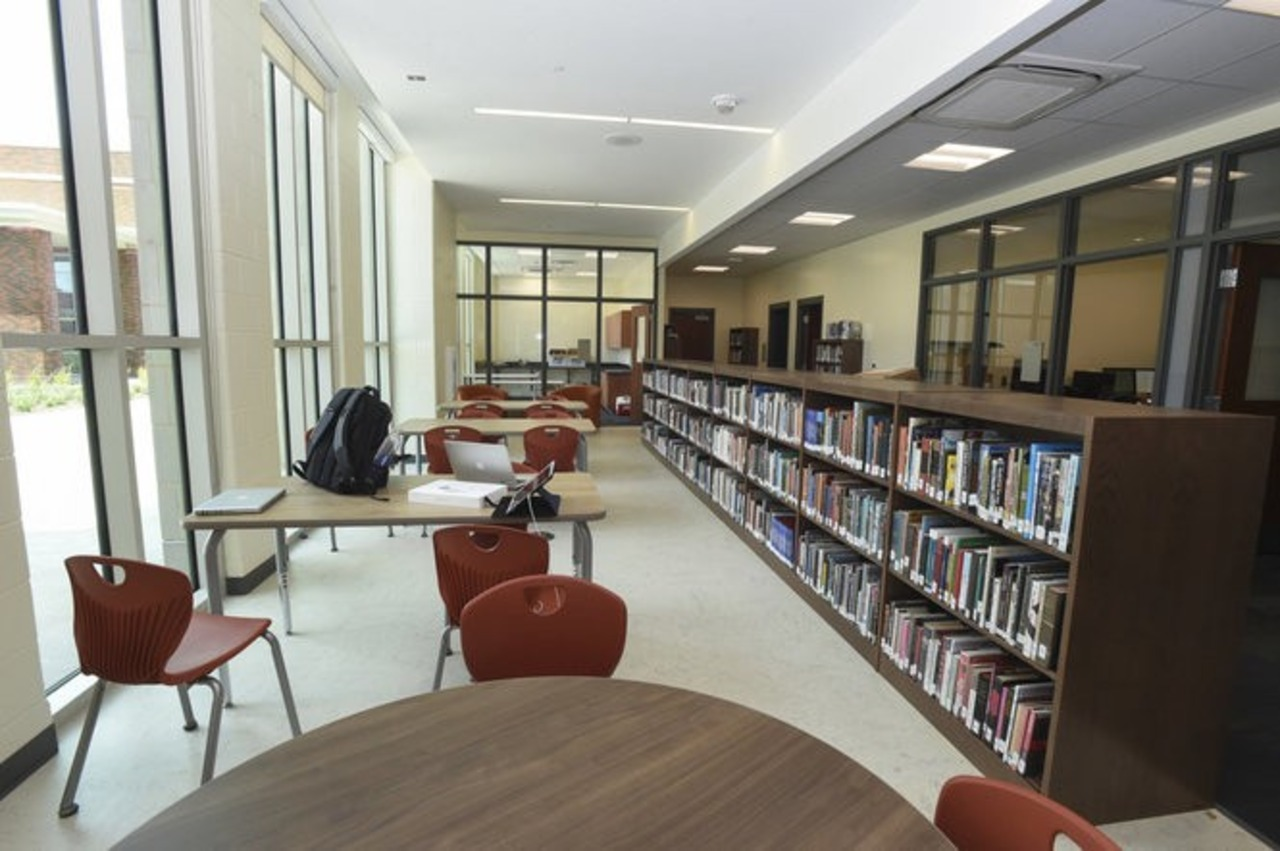
Auburn High School's Media Center

Auburn High School, the fourteenth–largest high school in Alabama (fourth-largest by grades 10–12 enrollment), enrolled 1,748 students in the 2015–2016 school year. Twenty-six percent of Auburn High's enrollment is African American, ten percent is of Asian descent whose majority is Korean, fifty-nine percent is of European descent. Three percent of students are classified as Hispanic. Over forty languages are spoken in the homes of Auburn High School students, and twenty percent of enrolled students are eligible for federal free or reduced lunch programs. Auburn High School has a 14.8:1 student-teacher ratio and a drop-out rate of 1.09%.

Auburn High was ranked the 77th best public high school overall and 28th best non-magnet public high school in the United States by Newsweek in May 2006 and one of the top 100 public high schools in the United States by the Associated Press based on Advanced Placement test scores. The school was rated the 125th best public high school in the United States by U.S. News & World Report and the second best educational value in the Southeast by SchoolMatch, as reported in The Wall Street Journal.

All teachers are certified in the area in which they teach. Of the 90 faculty, 4 have Doctorates and 57 have a Masters or AA degree. The student-teacher ratio is 1:25.

Auburn High School has four professional school counselors, a college and career readiness coordinator, an International Baccalaureate coordinator, a registrar, and a Counseling Department secretary.

On average, seven Auburn High students earn National Merit Finalist status each year. In 2006, 92 students were named AP Scholars by the College Board. Three Auburn High alumni have been named Fulbright Scholars, two Truman Scholars, one alumnus a Marshall Scholar, and one a Rotary Scholar. In 2007, ninety-five seniors received 190 scholarships worth US$5.54 million to 69 different colleges in 24 states. ($6 million, $7.5 million, $14.18 million in scholarship moneys in 2011, 2010, and 2012, respectively.) Graduates of the class of 2007 attend the University of Chicago, Columbia, Duke, Harvard, and Princeton.

In 2012, there were 68 AP Scholars, one National AP Scholar, nine AP Scholars with Honor, six AP Scholars with Distinction, eight National Merit Commended students, two National Merit semi-finalists, five National Merit finalists, two National Merit Special Scholarship Competition Award recipients, and 1 National Merit Hispanic Recognition Program Award recipient. Also in 2012, US$14.18 million in scholarships were raised by seniors, whose population was about 450. Some of these seniors then attended U-Penn, UC Berkeley, UCLA, Chicago, Vanderbilt, Emory, North Carolina, Georgia Tech, Cooper Union, McGill, and Berklee College of Music. As many students won scholarships that averaged about US$31,000 per students from these colleges and local colleges.

== Curriculum ==
The Auburn High School curriculum includes traditional high school academic subjects, advanced academic classes, music and art, and programs in business and marketing, agriscience, industrial systems technology, and engineering. Auburn High School awards three diploma endorsements indicating advanced study in a particular field, as well as the International Baccalaureate Diploma. Auburn High offers 35 college-level Advanced Placement, Technical Advanced Placement, and International Baccalaureate courses for college credit. Students are also provided access to college courses at nearby Auburn University and Southern Union State Community College. There is an option for 11th and 12th grade students who have completed all of their high school requirements, to jointly enroll at Auburn University or Southern Union State Community College.

Auburn High School has nine departments: the Foreign Language Department (1838), the Language Arts Department (1838), the Department of Mathematics (1838), the Science Department (1838), the Department of the Social Studies (1838), the Music Department (1841), the Art Department (1846), the Athletic Department (1911), and the Department of Career and Technical Education (1915).

== History ==
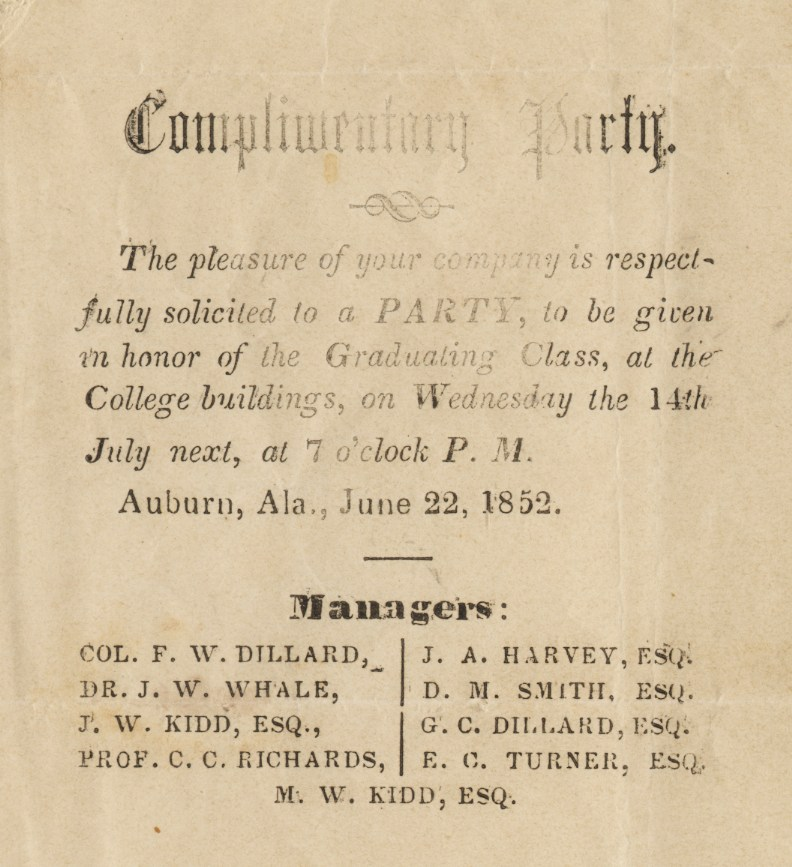
Auburn Female College graduation invitation, 1852

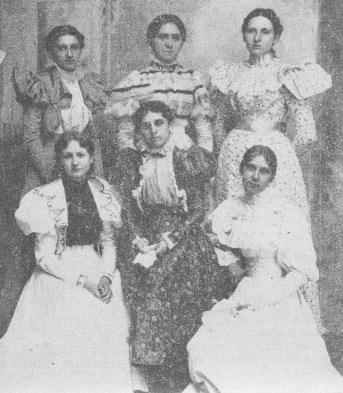
The Auburn Female Institute class of 1897

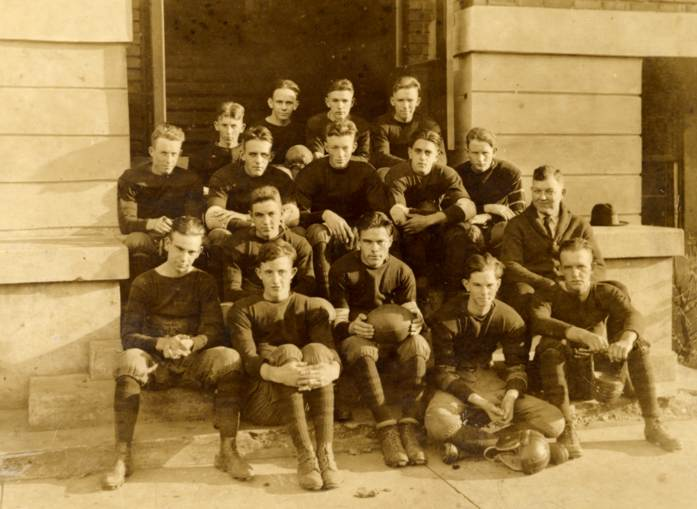
The Auburn High School football team, 1929

=== Beginnings ===
Auburn High School was founded as the private Auburn Academy in 1837, less than three years after the Auburn area had been opened to settlement, funded by the sale of the lots which now make up downtown Auburn. On February 19, 1838, the academy opened its first session, under the instruction of Simeon W. Yancey. A two-story frame school building was constructed later that year, and in 1840 the school divided into male and female divisions as the Auburn Male and Female Academy. By 1846, the schools were known as the Auburn High Schools, and in 1847 the male division split off the school, with the remaining female division taking the name Auburn Female Seminary. The school received a legislative charter as a Mason school in 1852, becoming the Auburn Masonic Female College.

The school attracted hundreds of boarding students to Auburn in the 1840s and 1850s, offering a complete secondary education to women—including ancient and modern languages, literature, mathematics, and musical arts—at the same academic level of that given to men. By the 1850s, the school physical plant had been expanded to three buildings: a main building, a music building, and a chapel which included the largest auditorium in eastern Alabama and a fully equipped chemistry laboratory. By 1855, the school enrolled 110 students. Faculty members included John M. Darby, a scientist who wrote his own textbooks for his students, including a Textbook of Chemistry and Botany of the Southern States, which was the earliest compilation of flora in the Southern United States, and William P. Harrison, a Methodist theologian who was eventually appointed chaplain of the United States House of Representatives. A significant part of the curriculum included foreign languages; courses in Greek, Latin, French, Spanish, German, and Italian were offered in 1861. The Auburn Masonic Female College hosted speakers and debates among some of the region's most recognizable luminaries, most notably an 1860 debate about secession, which included William Lowndes Yancey, Alexander Stephens, Benjamin Harvey Hill, and Robert Toombs.

The Masons relinquished control of the school to a shared board of trustees with the East Alabama Male College in the late 1850s, and in the early 1860s, the school began admitting boys to the secondary division. When the American Civil War began in 1861, virtually the entire male junior and senior classes of the school, as well as much of the faculty, joined Confederate States of America military units, particularly the 37th Alabama Regiment. As the "principal teacher", W.F. Slaton, was a major in the regiment, classes in Auburn stopped for the remainder of the war. The regiment was captured at Corinth, Mississippi, and exiled to the Johnson's Island prisoner of war camp on Lake Erie. While imprisoned there, Slaton held the school's classes in the camp. Notably, the African American Union guards, who were prohibited by law from attending school in their native Wisconsin, were invited to join the classes, making Auburn High one of the first Southern schools to integrate, some 90 years before Brown v. Board.

While the school continued operation through and after the war, economic hardships in the Reconstruction era caused the school to temporarily close in the late 1860s.

=== From private college to public high school ===
Around 1870, the school reopened in the building formerly occupied by the male academy, on the site of the current Auburn City Hall. The school took the name Auburn Female College, despite admitting both boys and girls.

Through the 1870s the town's economic condition was poor, and the school, still run by the Methodist Episcopal Church, South, closed at least once more before reopening permanently in 1877. In 1885, a separate town-funded public school system for Auburn was created, and the previously private Auburn Female College became the public "Auburn High School", although tuition was still charged. While this new public funding allowed the school to remain open much longer than before—200 days in 1886—enrollment was significantly lower than it was prior to the Civil War, with an 1889 report listing Auburn High School as enrolling fewer than 20 students.

In 1892, Auburn University (then the Alabama Agricultural and Mechanical College) decided to admit women. Since the college only admitted women with junior standing, Auburn High added three more years of classes beyond the secondary level—equivalent to freshman and sophomore college classes—for women. With this addition, the name of the school was changed to the "Auburn Female Institute".

In 1899, a two-story building was built for Auburn High. In 1908, the school dropped the post-secondary program and became "Auburn High School" once more. Around 1910, Auburn High fielded its first basketball team, and in 1911, its first football squad.

=== Modern era ===
In 1914, Auburn High became the flagship high school for the county and was officially renamed Lee County High School, though "Auburn High School" remained the common name of the school. That same year, the school relocated from the 1899 building to a new structure on Opelika Road.

In the period between 1910 and 1920, Auburn High changed from an academy of the classic 19th-century model, focusing on the traditional Latin course, to a high school offering vocational and technical courses in addition to the academic offerings. Auburn High added vocational courses to the curriculum in 1918, the eighth high school in the state to implement such a program. Over the next two decades, Auburn High developed its modern extracurricular face, forming band, choir, drama, and other programs, as well as diversifying occupational classes. In 1925, Auburn High became one of the first high schools in the state to be accredited by the Southern Association of Colleges and Schools. A new school building was constructed at 332 E Samford Ave in 1931, and in 1956, the school was officially renamed Auburn High School.

In 1961, the City of Auburn again created its own school system, with Auburn High as the new district's high school. In 1966, the school moved to the 405 S. Dean Rd campus, organized as a "Freedom of Choice" school designed to promote desegregation. In 1971, Auburn High merged with nearby Drake High to complete its integration.

Six major additions were made to the 405 S Dean Rd campus since the original construction in 1966, and it is currently the site of Auburn Junior High School. In 1997, Auburn High added an International Baccalaureate program, with the first IB diplomas awarded in 1999.

The current campus at 1701 E Samford Ave was completed in 2017, at a cost of $72 million. The former campus at 405 S Dean Rd now serves as Auburn Junior High School.

== Extracurricular organizations ==
Auburn High School offers the following academic clubs, athletic teams, and service organizations (founding year at Auburn High in parentheses).

- A Club (1923)
- Advocacy Club (2005)
- Anchor Club (1973)
- Anime Society (2000)
- BEST Robotics (2001)
- Color Guard/Honor Guard (1975)
- Confidential (2016)
- Debate Team (2016)
- DECA (Organization) (1979)
- Diamond Dolls (ca. 2000)
- Drill Team (1976)
- English Honor Society (1996)
- Environmental Club (1990)
- Family, Career, and Community Leaders of America (1922)
- Fellowship of Christian Athletes (1970)
- Film Appreciation Society (1996)
- French Club (1977)
- French Honor Society (1985)
- Future Business Leaders of America (1964)
- Future Farmers of America (1932)
- Future Teachers of America (1949)
- German Club (1973)
- German National Honor Society (1985)
- Government Club (1976)
- Hal Moore Leadership Academy (2009)
- HOSA (1979)
- Judicial Club (1988)
- Junior Civitan (1955)
- Key Club (1956)
- Korean Kultural Club (2012)
- Math Team (ca. 2000)
- Mu Alpha Theta (1970)
- Muslim Students' Association (2025)
- Multicultural Club (2002)
- National Art Honor Society (1978)
- National Honor Society (1940)
- Pep Club (1955)
- Raider Team (1976)
- Rifle Team (1976)
- Scholars' Bowl (1982)
- Science Club (1957)
- Science Olympiad (1985)
- The Sheet (1968)
- Skills USA (2000)
- Spanish Club (1967)
- Spanish National Honor Society (1985)
- Student Council (1943)
- Student Outreach for Christ (1978)
- Theatre Center Stage (1968)
- Tiger Ambassadors (2005)
- Tiger TV (2003)

=== Athletics ===
Auburn High School athletics logo

Auburn High School offers 11 men's and 10 women's varsity sports, all in the large school (7a) classification of the Alabama High School Athletic Association (AHSAA). Men's sports offered are basketball, baseball, cross country, indoor track, outdoor track, American football, wrestling, tennis, golf, swimming, and soccer. Women's sports offered are basketball, softball, cross country, indoor track, outdoor track, volleyball, tennis, golf, swimming, and soccer. Auburn High has placed in the top ten of the 6A all-sports rankings every year since 1995, ranking in the top four for each of the last five years. Auburn High has won a total of 51 team state championships.

Auburn High's football team competes in Region 3 of class 7A along with Central High of Phenix City, Dothan, Enterprise, Northview High of Dothan, Opelika, and Smiths Station. Since 2004, Auburn High has produced more Pro Bowl National Football League players than any other high school. AHS alumni in the NFL include Marcus Washington of the Washington Commanders, Osi Umenyiora of the New York Giants, and DeMarcus Ware of the Dallas Cowboys. Auburn High's football team was organized in 1911, and has an all-time record of 545–355–33. AHS has traditional rivalries with Opelika, Central, Lanett, and Valley High Schools. The Auburn High football squad has finished the regular season unbeaten on eight occasions (1915, 1918, 1919, 1921, 1923, 1934, 1952, 2008, and 2009), the second-most of any Alabama high school in class 6A. Auburn High has twice been ranked first in the state (October 1967 and October–November 2009), and proceeded deepest into the playoffs in 2001 and 2009, when the team reached the semifinal round. AHS has won the region, area or conference championship on nineteen occasions since 1921: in 1922, 1923, 1925, 1926, 1927, 1929, 1934, 1937, 1940, 1948, 1952, 1967, 1972, 1973, 1987, 1990, 2004, 2008, 2009, and 2010. The football team's home field is 8,310-seat Duck Samford Stadium. Football games are broadcast on the radio station WTGZ 93.9 FM, WAUD AM 1230 and sportscallauburn.com.

Auburn High's men's basketball team won the 6A state championship in 2005, and was state runner-up in 1924, 1987, 1991, and 1996. Since 1980, the team has won the region championship eleven times and has reached the playoffs twenty times. The team is coached by 27-year veteran Frank Tolbert, who holds a 633–303 record. The Auburn High women's basketball team won the state championship in 1919. The basketball team plays at the 1,600 seat Auburn Fieldhouse on the Auburn High campus. Basketball games are broadcast on WAUD AM 1230 and sportscallauburn.com.

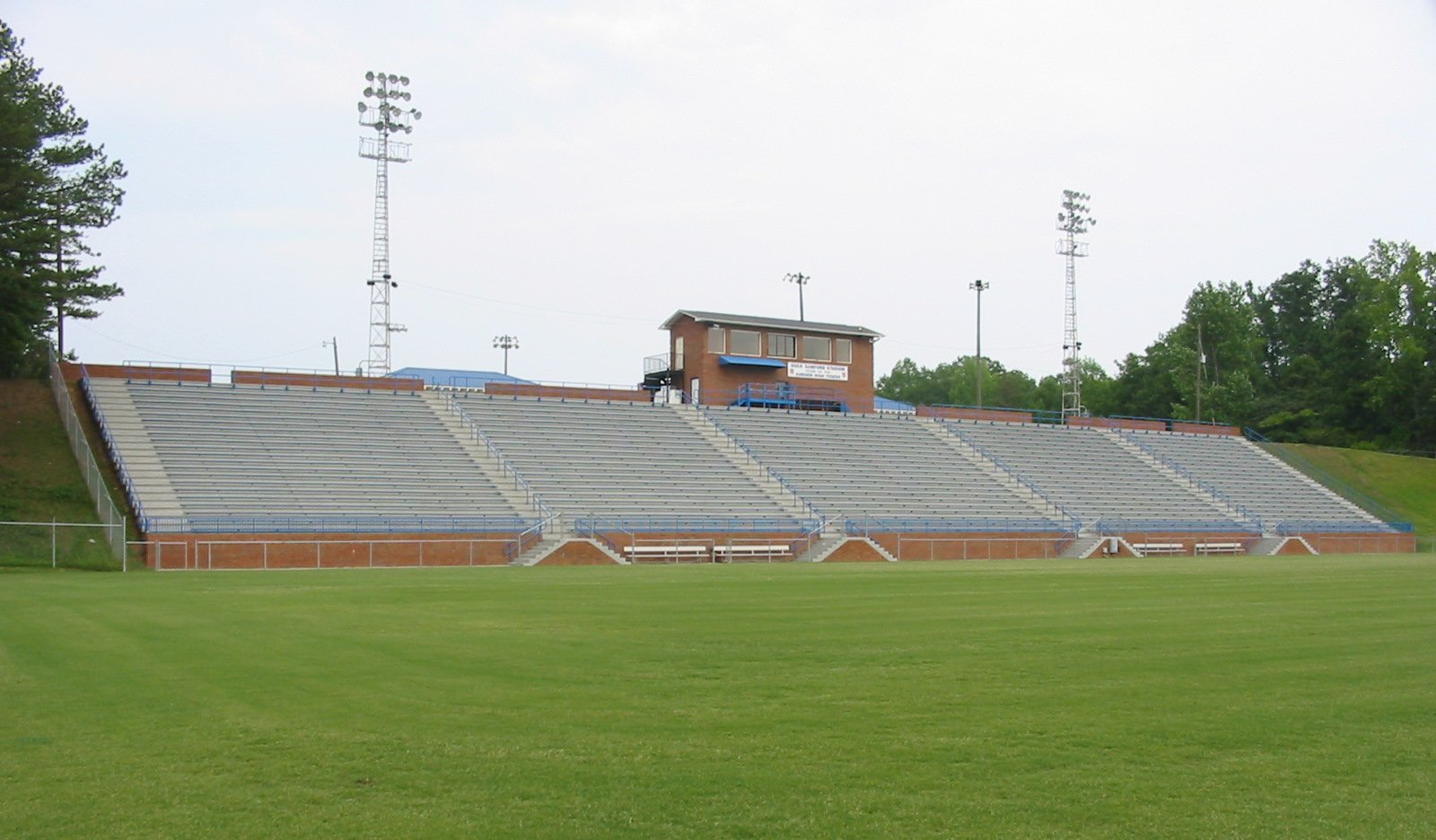
Auburn High School's Duck Samford Stadium

Auburn High's six track family sports—men's and women's outdoor track, men's and women's indoor track, and men's and women's cross country—have won twenty state championships. AHS men's outdoor track squad has won eight AHSAA titles and has placed in the top 13 at the state track meet seven of the last eight years. AHS men's track team most recently won the 6A State Title in 2013. AHS women's outdoor team won a state title in 1986, and has placed in the top 12 at the state meet each of the last eight years. Men's indoor track has won four state titles, and men's cross country has won the state crown six times. An Auburn High student won the state decathlon in 1970. Prior to the creation of the AHSAA state meet, Auburn High School won the Alabama Interscholastic Track and Field Meet in 1921 and 1923.

The Auburn High baseball Tigers trace their lineage to teams which played as early as 1912. The baseball Tigers have won three state titles, in 1986, 2009, and 2010, and were state runners-up in 1973. Matt Cimo is the head coach of the AHS baseball team. Auburn High has reached the state playoffs eleven of the past thirteen years, reaching the semifinals in 1998 and 2001 in addition to the state championships of 2009 and 2010. The most notable player produced by the Auburn High School baseball program is pitcher Joe Beckwith, who played for the Los Angeles Dodgers (1979–1983, 1986) and Kansas City Royals (1984–1985). Baseball games are broadcast on WAUD AM 1230 and sportscallauburn.com

Auburn High's men's soccer program, coached by Bo Morrissey, has reached the 6A state playoffs each year of the program's existence, including final four appearances in 2005, 2010, and 2012, winning the 6A state championship in 2012. The women's soccer program, coached by Mac Matthews, has reached the final four of the state playoffs six of the last seven years (2004, 2005, 2006, 2007, 2008, 2009). Soccer matches are broadcast on AM 1230 WAUD and sportscallauburn.com. Auburn High's men's golf program has won the last four 6A state championships. AHS women's golf won the state title in 2010, and was runner up in 2007, 2008, and 2009. Auburn High's official home golf course is Indian Pines Golf Course, though the Auburn University Club and Robert Trent Jones' Grand National are often used as home courses. Divers on Auburn High School's swimming team have won ten state championships since 1988, and both the men's and women's swimming and diving teams were state runners-up in 2008 and 2009. The women's swimming and diving team was also third in the state in 2006 with a state champion relay performance. Auburn shares the James E. Martin Aquatics Center with the Auburn University swimming and diving program.

=== Music ===
The Auburn High School Band was awarded the Sudler Flag of Honor by the John Philip Sousa Foundation as the top high school concert ensemble in the United States, Canada, and Japan in 1987. The Auburn High Band has also been placed on the "Historic Roll of Honor of Distinguished High School Concert Bands in America" as a band which as attained "unusual levels of achievement nationally and which [is] considered to be of historical importance and influence to the nation's high school concert band programs." The top concert band, the Auburn High School Honors Band, has an all-time ratings record of 351–4–0–0–0, has received less than a perfect rating only three times since 1946, and has received perfect ratings from all judges since 1974. The Band has twice performed for the Music Educators National Conference, and in 1996 became the first high school band ever invited to perform for a College Band Directors National Association Conference.

Auburn High School's jazz ensemble, the Lab Band, was named one of the top ten high school jazz bands in the United States in 1974, and in 1978 performed on the National Association of Jazz Educators "Project II" album as one of "The Nation's Most Outstanding Jazz Bands". The Lab Band has an all-judges record of 126–2–0–0–0, and has performed at the Montreux Jazz Festival in Switzerland.

Auburn High School has three competitive show choirs, the mixed-gender "Varsity Singers" and the all-female "Èlan", and the all-male "Men at Work". The program also hosts an annual competition.

=== Science Olympiad ===
The Auburn High School Science Olympiad team has placed either first or second in the state, and thus has represented Alabama at the national competition, 10 out the past 12 years.

== Campus ==
Student enrollment history
School year	Enrollment
2015–2016	1748
2014–2015	1731
2013–2014	1625
2012–2013	1540
2011–2012	1444
2010–2011	1424
2009–2010	1309
2008–2009	1254
2007–2008	1152
2006–2007	1135
2005–2006	1095
2004–2005	1048
2003–2004	974
2002–2003	915

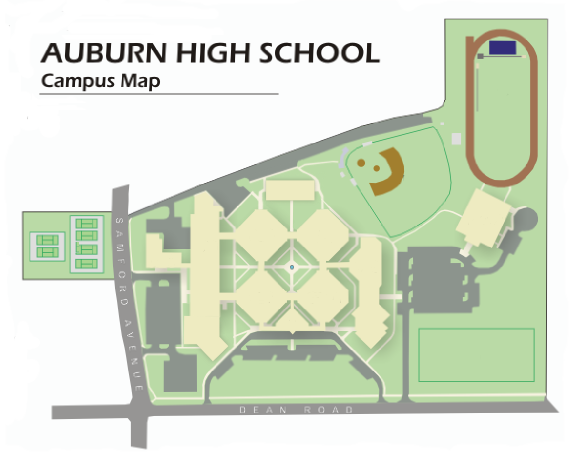
A map of Auburn High's former campus (1965–2017)

From 1965 to 2017, Auburn High was situated on 36 acres (0.15 km^{2}) in the east-central part of Auburn. The school was designed in a modernist style on an open campus-style setting, with three detached buildings separated by outdoor walkways and courtyards spread out over 70% of the campus area. The campus is located between Samford Avenue and University Drive, in a residential area. Adjacent to the campus is the Church of the Highlands. Auburn University is located approximately three miles (1.6 km) west of the school.

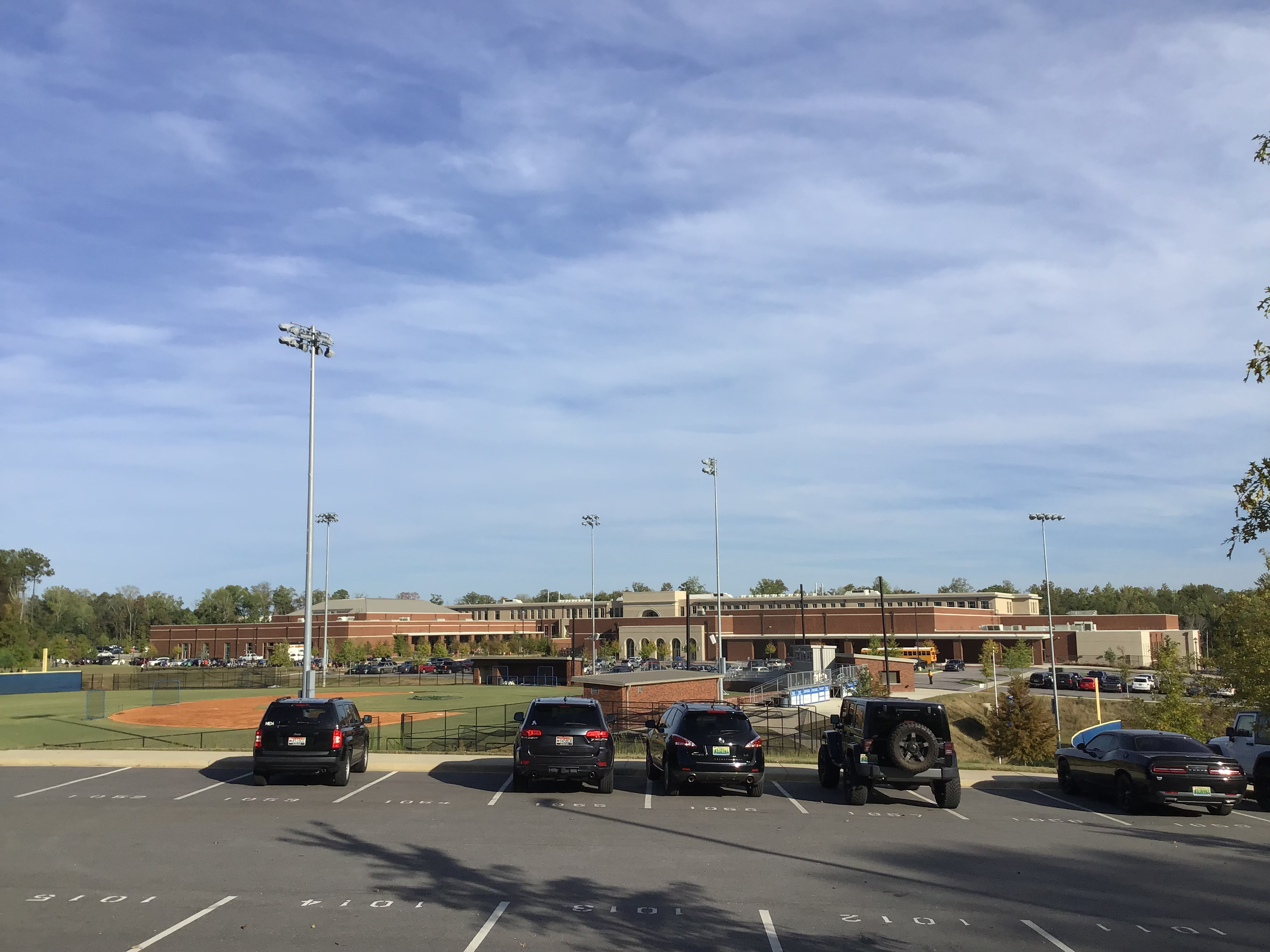
The back side of Auburn High School

The former Auburn High School campus was constructed in 1965, and originally consisted of four buildings; the 100, 200, 300, and 400 buildings. The 100 building contains the auditorium, cafeteria, and music and vocational classrooms, the 200 and 300 buildings contain academic classrooms including the aquatic biology laboratory (300) and the counselors' offices (200), and the 400 building contains a gymnasium and athletic facilities. Additions were constructed in 1974 with the 500 building, containing academic classrooms, and in 1979 with the 600 building, containing business and JROTC classrooms. An administration building was erected in the 1980s, and the largest academic classroom building, the 800 building, containing classrooms, a library, and a multi-media room, was built in 1995. The Auburn Fieldhouse, a competition gymnasium, was built in 2005, a new academic building containing science classrooms was constructed in 2008, and the Julie and Hal Moore Center for Excellence, a performing arts facility, was completed in 2010. Outdoor areas include "The Hill", a slope directly south of the 100 building and traditional site of senior pranks, and "The Courtyard", between the 200, 300, 400, and 500 buildings.

The campus contains 94 academic classrooms, a 1,250-seat auditorium, a 1,600-seat competition gym (the Auburn Fieldhouse), six tennis courts, a baseball field (Sam Welborn Field), a track, cafeteria, library, multi-media room, practice gym, and physical education fields. Off-campus athletic facilities include 8,310-seat Duck Samford Stadium, the Auburn Softball Complex, and the James E. Martin Aquatic Center. The school maintains a 1.16:1 student–to–computer ratio, with all classrooms having wired (100 Mbit/s) Internet connections and LCD projectors, while the campus as a whole is covered by a wireless network.

== Traditions ==
=== Mascot ===
Auburn High's mascot is the tiger. The tiger was chosen because of its association with Auburn in Oliver Goldsmith's 1770 poem The Deserted Village. The first line of the poem is "Sweet Auburn! Loveliest village of the plain", while a later line describes Auburn as "where crouching tigers wait their hapless prey."

Auburn High's costumed mascot is Samford, an anthropomorphic tiger. Samford was created in 1995 and named for three symbols of the school: Samford Avenue, which runs by the school; Duck Samford Stadium, Auburn High's football stadium; and Samford Hall, the most prominent building in Auburn. Kari Pierce and Brian Puckett were the first Samford in 1995.

=== School songs ===
The Auburn High School "Alma Mater" is Auburn High's school song its most famous version is a cover by Radio Decay, previous Auburn High students. For athletic events, Auburn High uses two fight songs, "Hooray for Auburn!"—the primary fight song—and "Glory, Glory to Ole Auburn".

==== Alma Mater ====
The Auburn High School "Alma Mater" was written in 1955 by band and choral director George Corradino and members of the Auburn High School Glee Club. It replaced a previous alma mater of unknown origins. The "Alma Mater" is used at academic ceremonies and at some athletic events. A common epithet for the school used by students and alumni, "dear old Auburn High", is taken from the last line of the song.

==== Fight songs ====
Hooray for Auburn! (Auburn High School fight song)
Music by Tommy Goff (1961)
Performed by the Auburn High School Band (1962–63)

Auburn High School's primary fight song is "Hooray for Auburn!". The lyrics to "Hooray for Auburn!" come from a cheer that was commonly used in the mid-20th century. In 1961, Auburn High School band director Tommy Goff wrote music to fit those lyrics to create the current fight song. In subsequent years, the fight song was adopted by other schools, including Prattville High School, Sheffield High School and Opelika High School. At football games, "Hooray for Auburn!" is played after a touchdown.

"Glory, Glory to Ole Auburn"—often simply "Glory"—was Auburn High's fight song before "Hooray for Auburn!" was written in 1961 and is currently a secondary fight song of Auburn High. "Glory, Glory to Ole Auburn" has the tune of the chorus of the "Battle Hymn of the Republic", while the lyrics are identical to those of the University of Georgia's "Glory, Glory" but substitute the word "Auburn" for "Georgia". At football games, "Glory, Glory to Ole Auburn" is played after a successful PAT conversion.

For the 1955 football season, Auburn High used the Alabama Polytechnic Institute fight song "War Eagle". An earlier school song, "We're Loyal to You, Auburn High", was used from the 1920s through the 1940s. "We're Loyal to You, Auburn High" has the melody of "Illinois Loyalty".

=== Student publications ===
The Auburn High School yearbook is The Tiger. It has been published annually since 1945, and is produced by students on the yearbook staff. In addition, Auburn High has a literary magazine, The Sheet.

The journalism classes at Auburn High print a monthly newspaper, the AHS Free Press. The Free Press and its three predecessor student newspapers, the AHS Chronicle, the Tiger Tales, and the Tiger News have been published since the early 1950s. An earlier paper, the Young Ladies' Mirror, was published by students in the 1850s.

Starting in 2007, Auburn High students run a campus television station, known as Tiger TV.

== Notable people ==
The following are notable people associated with Auburn High School. If the person was an Auburn High School student, the number in parentheses indicates the year of graduation; if the person was a faculty or staff member, that person's title and years of association are included.

- John M. Darby (president, 1855–1858; professor of Natural Science, 1855–1862)—botanist
- William P. Harrison (president, 1861–1862)—theologian and author, chaplain of the United States House of Representatives
- James R. Dowdell (1863–64)—chief justice, Supreme Court of Alabama
- William J. Samford (1864)—governor of Alabama
- Leonidas Warren Payne Jr. (1888)—academic, editor of the first anthology of Texas literature
- William Spratling (1917)—silversmith and artist
- Tom Sellers (1941)—journalist, winner 1955 Pulitzer Prize
- John E. Pitts Jr. (1942)—US Army brigadier general, director of International Staff, Inter-American Defense Board
- Mary Lou Foy (1962)—photojournalist, picture editor, The Washington Post
- Joe Beckwith (1973)—Major League Baseball pitcher
- Allen Hinds (1974)—guitarist and jazz musician
- Joe Turnham (1977)—chairman, Alabama Democratic Party
- Vanessa Echols (1979)—news anchor, WRDQ and WFTV, Orlando, Florida
- Ted Vives (1982)—composer
- Man or Astro-man? (1980s)—surf punk band
- Kate Higgins (1987)—voice actress, Naruto; singer
- William Chen (1988)—mathematician, winner in two 2006 World Series of Poker events
- Ace Atkins (1989)—author, Pulitzer Prize-nominated journalist
- Robert Gibbs (1989)—28th White House Press Secretary
- Tracy Rocker (defensive coordinator, 1992–1993)—NFL football player, winner of college football's Outland Trophy and Lombardi Award
- Mark Spencer (1995)—founder/CTO of Digium, creator of Asterisk PBX
- Marcus Washington (1996)—NFL football player
- Osi Umenyiora (1999)—NFL football player
- DeMarcus Ware (2001)—NFL football player
- Cody Core (2012)—NFL football player
- Reuben Foster (2013)—NFL football player
- Cameron Echols-Luper (2013)—CFL football player
- Rashaan Evans (2013)—NFL football player
- Ryan Watson (2016)—Major League Baseball pitcher
- Garrison Brooks (2017)—NBA G League basketball player
- Natalie Stephens - Age of Attraction (Netflix Series) Co-Host
