= General Pitt =

General Pitt may refer to:

- George Dean Pitt (died 1851), British Army general
- William Augustus Pitt (c. 1728–1809), British Army general
- John Pitt, 2nd Earl of Chatham (1756–1835), British Army general
- John E. Pitts Jr. (1924–1977), U.S. Air Force brigadier general

== See also ==
- Walter Pitt-Taylor (1878–1950), British Army general
