= Drake Middle School =

Drake Middle School may refer to:

- J. F. Drake Middle School, in Auburn, Alabama
- O. B. Drake Middle School, in Arvada, Colorado
- Pioneer Trail Middle School, in Olathe, Kansas
