= Langdon Hall =

Building on the Auburn University campus

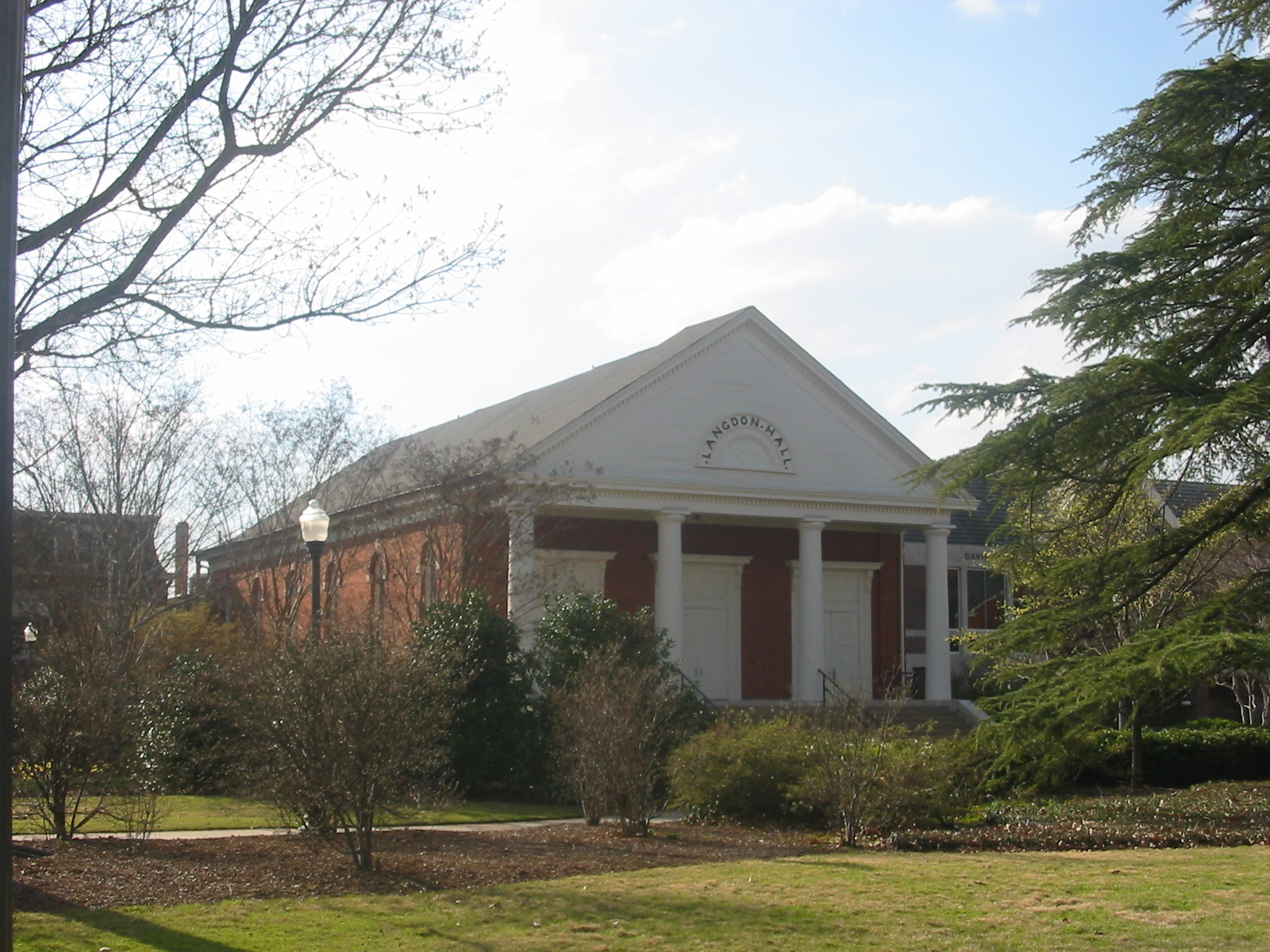
- Interactive map of the Langdon Hall area
- Former names: Auburn Female College Chapel

General information
- Architectural style: Greek Revival
- Location: Auburn, Alabama, USA
- Coordinates: 32°36′19″N 85°28′58″W
- Completed: 1846, rebuilt 1883

Technical details
- Floor count: 2
- Floor area: 10,502 sq ft (975.7 m^{2})

Design and construction
- Architect: W. P. Wood (1883 remodel)

Langdon Hall is a building on the campus of Auburn University in Auburn, Alabama, United States. Built in the Greek Revival style in 1846 as the chapel for the Auburn Female College (today Auburn High School) and moved to the Auburn University campus in 1883, Langdon Hall is the oldest building in the city of Auburn, and today houses an auditorium and office space for Auburn University staff. Before the Civil War, Langdon Hall served as the location for a series of debates on the question of Southern secession, involving William Lowndes Yancey, Alexander Stephens, Benjamin Harvey Hill, and Robert Toombs. Langdon Hall is named for Charles Carter Langdon, a former mayor of Mobile, Alabama, Alabama Secretary of State, and a trustee of Auburn University from 1872–1889.

== History ==
=== Early history ===
Langdon Hall was built as the chapel for the Auburn Female College (later the Auburn Masonic Female College and today Auburn High School) in 1846. Prior to the chapel's construction, public lectures were held in the Methodist church, then town's only public hall. Public feeling was that such lectures were inappropriate for a church, and members of the congregation contributed funds for the building's construction. The chapel was sited across from the Methodist church, on the current northeast corner of Gay Street and Magnolia Avenue (32.60700°N 85.47962°W). Upon construction, the chapel held the largest auditorium in east Alabama, and as such served as the regional center for lectures and political debates. The lower level of the chapel held the Female College's chemistry laboratory, which was expanded in the 1850s by professor John M. Darby to produce the patent disinfectant Darby's Prophylactic Fluid. When the East Alabama Male College (today Auburn University) opened in 1859, Darby taught joint chemistry classes in the chapel jointly with the Female College students.

=== Secession debates ===
By the latter part of the 1850s, the chapel became commonly used for political debates over the question of whether the Southern states should secede from the United States. In May 1859, the chapel held the nominating convention of the Democratic Party for the 3rd Congressional District of Alabama, nominating David Clopton, a States' Rights Democrat, for Congress. In 1860, a major debate was held in the chapel involving Clopton, Seaborn Jones, Benjamin Harvey Hill, Alexander Stephens, Robert Toombs, William G. Brownlow, and William Lowndes Yancey. In that day-long debate, Clopton, Jones, and Hill debated in the morning session, with Stephens arguing against secession to open the afternoon. Toombs followed, supporting the states' rights position, but the anti-secession arguments of Brownlow seemed to win the debate for the pro-Union side. Yancey—ill in Montgomery—was not in attendance for most of the day, but as the anti-secessionists gained the upper hand as the day wore on, a special train was sent to bring him to Auburn. As the debate prepared to wrap up in the early evening, Yancey finally arrived, extemporaneously speaking for an hour and a half on the arguments for secession. Yancey's oratory proved sufficient to carry the day for the secessionists, and the country moved one step closer to Civil War.

=== Move and reconstruction ===
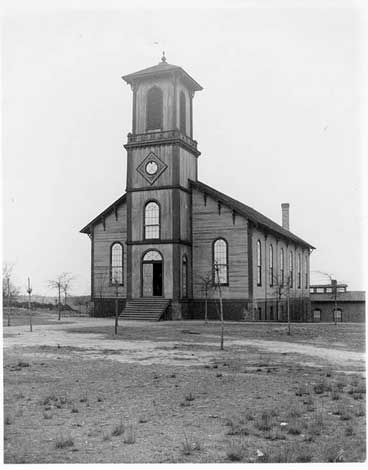
The Chapel (now Langdon Hall), as it appeared before being bricked in 1892.

During the Civil War, the chapel acted as a hospital for Confederate troops In 1883, the state legislature appropriated $30,000 to the Alabama Agricultural and Mechanical College—the East Alabama Male College's new name—for improvements to the college's main building and construction of a new building. The "new building" built was the old chapel, disassembled on site and reassembled on the A&M college campus. The building was reassembled by the plans of W. D. Wood, an 1881 graduate of the A&M college. In 1889, the old chapel was renamed Langdon Hall, after Charles Carter Langdon, who was a former mayor and editor in Mobile, Alabama, Alabama secretary of state, and an A&M college trustee.

The reconstructed Langdon Hall now had woodworking and mechanical engineering laboratories in the old chemistry lab; a dynamo built there allowed the auditorium above to be lit with electric lights in 1888. When the A&M college's main building burned in 1887, the Langdon auditorium was temporarily divided into four classrooms and an assembly room, and in 1892 the half-century-old tower was removed and the building was bricked.

=== 20th century to today ===
By the early twentieth century, Langdon Hall had become the social center of the campus. Langdon hosted classes, motion pictures, commencement exercises, music performances, and pep rallies. When the engineering department completely moved out of Langdon in 1921, the lower floor housed the Home Economics Department; in 1924, that same floor became a YMCA, and in 1933, the student center. The auditorium was remodeled in 1950, served as the 'free movies' theater in the 1970s through 1990s, and later, the lower floor was converted to offices. It is included in the Auburn University Historic District.
