= Hooray for Auburn! =

Fight song of Auburn High School

"Hooray for Auburn!" (sometimes Hurrah for Auburn! or simply Hooray!) is the fight song of Auburn High School in Auburn, Alabama, United States. The melody and basic wording of "Hooray for Auburn" have been adopted for use in the fight songs of many schools in the United States, including Hoover High School ("Hooray for Hoover"), Sheffield High School ("Hurrah For Sheffield") and Prattville High School ("Hooray for Prattville").

== Lyrics ==
Hooray for Auburn! (Auburn High School fight song)
Music by Tommy Goff (1961).
Words adapted from a public domain cheer.
Performed by the Auburn High School Band, 1962-63.

The lyrics to "Hooray for Auburn" are as follows:

Hooray for Auburn!
Hooray for Auburn!
Someone in the crowd is yelling "Hooray for Auburn!"
One, two, three, four!
Who you gonna yell for?
Auburn, that's who!

Korean translation

오번을위한 만세!
오번을위한 만세!
군중 속 누군가가 "오번을위한 만세!"
하나, 둘, 셋, 넷!
누구 한테 소리 지르 겠어?
오번, 저 사람이야!

Revised Romanization

Obeoneulwihan manse!
Obeoneulwihan manse!
Gunjung sok nugungaga "Obeoneulwihan manse!"
Hana, dul, set, net!
Nugu hante sori jireu gesseo?
Obeon, jeo saramiya!

When used by other schools, the lyrics are generally modified by changing the word "Auburn" to something else, such as the school name or mascot.

== History ==
The basic lyrical structure of "Hooray for Auburn" comes from a cheer that was common in the mid-twentieth century. One of the earliest published versions of the cheer is in Lucile Hasley's 1953 book The Mouse Hunter. In 1961, Auburn High School Band director Tommy Goff wrote music for these lyrics after hearing the cheer used by the Auburn High cheerleaders at a junior varsity football game. The song began being used as the Auburn High School fight song later that year. Around 1963, LaFayette High School in LaFayette, Alabama began using the music as their fight song and soon after several other schools in eastern Alabama adopted "Hooray!".

== Schools which use "Hooray!" as a fight song ==
The following schools use or have used a variation of "Hooray for Auburn!" as a fight song:

- Academy High School - Kingsville, Texas (Hooray Academy!)
- Anniston High School - Anniston, Alabama (Hooray for Bulldogs!)
- Auburn High School - Auburn, Alabama (Hooray for Auburn!)
- Benjamin Russell High School - Alexander City, Alabama (Hooray for Wildcats!)
- Cherry Hill High School East - Cherry Hill, New Jersey (Hoorah for Cougars!)
- Chilton County High School - Clanton, Alabama (Hoorah for Chilton!)
- Eufaula High School - Eufaula, Alabama ("Hooray for Tigers!")
- Glendale High School - Glendale, Arizona (Hoorah, for Glendale!)
- Greenville High School- Greenville, Alabama (Hooray for Tigers!)
- Helena Middle School - Helena, Alabama (Hooray for Huskies!)
- Homewood High School - Homewood, Alabama (Hoorah for Homewood!)
- Hoover High School - Hoover, Alabama (Hooray for Hoover!)
- Lanett High School (Lanett, Alabama) (Hooray for Panthers )
- Luray High School - Luray, Virginia (Hurrah for Luray!)
- Eustis High School - Eustis, Florida (Hoorah for Eustis!)
- Miami High School - Miami, Florida (Hooray Miami!)
- Monroe Academy -- Monroeville, Alabama (Hooray for Monroe!)
- Opelika High School - Opelika, Alabama (Hooray for Bulldogs!)
- Oxford High School - Oxford, Alabama (Hoorah for Jackets!)
- Pell City High School - Pell City, Alabama (Hoorah for Panthers!)
- Pine Forest High School - Pensacola, Florida (Hooray for Eagles)
- Prattville High School - Prattville, Alabama (Hooray for Prattville!)
- Reeltown High School - Reeltown, Alabama - (Hurrah for Rebels)
- Richard J. Reynolds High School - Winston-Salem, North Carolina (Hoorah for Reynolds!)
- Southwest Miami Senior High School - Miami, Florida - (Hooray for Southwest)
- Springfield High School - Springfield, Illinois (Hurrah! for Springfield)
- Susquehanna Township High School - Harrisburg, Pennsylvania (Hurrah! for Indians)
- Holtville High School - Holtville, Alabama (Hooray for Bulldogs)
- Valley High School - Valley, Alabama (Hooray for Valley)
- Simmons Middle School (Hoover, Alabama) (Hooray for Hoover)
