= Tom Sellers (journalist) =

American journalist (1922–2006)

- Born: November 1, 1922
- Died: February 18, 2006 (aged 83); Atlanta, Georgia, USA
- Occupation: Journalist
- Notable credit: Columbus Ledger

Thomas J. Sellers, Jr. (November 1, 1922 – February 18, 2006) was an American newspaper reporter, primarily for the Columbus Ledger-Enquirer and Sunday Ledger-Enquirer in Columbus, Georgia (1950–1968). The Ledger-Enquirer received the 1955 Pulitzer Prize for Public Service for exposing the corrupt government of Phenix City, Alabama. Sellers was among the first to report on events from Phenix City.

== Biography ==
Sellers was raised in Alabama, attending Lee County High School in Auburn, Alabama. Sellers' first newspaper jobs were in the 1940s with the Associated Press and the Montgomery Advertiser. In 1950, he joined the staff of the Columbus Ledger, where he was assigned the Phenix City beat, covering news of Phenix City, a suburb of Columbus across the Chattahoochee River in Alabama.

Phenix City had long been controlled by a corrupt city government tied to gambling interests. Starting in 1950, Sellers reported on the Phenix City government, collecting evidence of corruption and reporting it in the Ledger. In 1952, Sellers was attacked while covering a contested city election. By 1954, the evidence collected in Sellers articles led a Phenix City lawyer, Albert Patterson, to run for Alabama attorney general on a platform of cleaning up Phenix City. When Patterson won the election, the local sheriff, acting under orders of the mayor of Phenix City, assassinated the attorney general-elect. Sellers continued to report on the city leaders' actions and attempts to stonewall the investigation, finally leading to Governor Gordon Persons declaring "martial rule", a modified form of martial law, in the city. Sellers and his staff created an "Extra" edition of the Ledger and were the first to report on the events from Phenix City. Sellers later reported as the military forces of the Alabama National Guard dismantled the gambling establishment and city government.

For covering, or uncovering, the problems in Phenix City, the Ledger won the 1955 Pulitzer Prize for Public Service:

For its complete news coverage and fearless editorial attack on widespread corruption in neighboring Phenix City, Alabama which were effective in destroying a corrupt and racket-ridden city government. The newspaper exhibited an early awareness of the evils of lax law enforcement before the situation in Phenix City erupted into murder. It covered the whole unfolding story of the final prosecution of the wrong-doers with skill, perception, force and courage.

Sellers remained at the Ledger until 1968, when he left to become a science editor and information officer at Emory University. In 1986, he compiled his front-page newspaper columns from 1958 to 1968 as a book, Valley Echoes (Atlanta: Davicone; ISBN 0-9370-8903-6). Sellers died of a heart attack on February 18, 2006, at his home in Atlanta Georgia.
