= Auburn City Hall =

- Auburn City Hall (U.S. Post Office)
- U.S. National Register of Historic Places
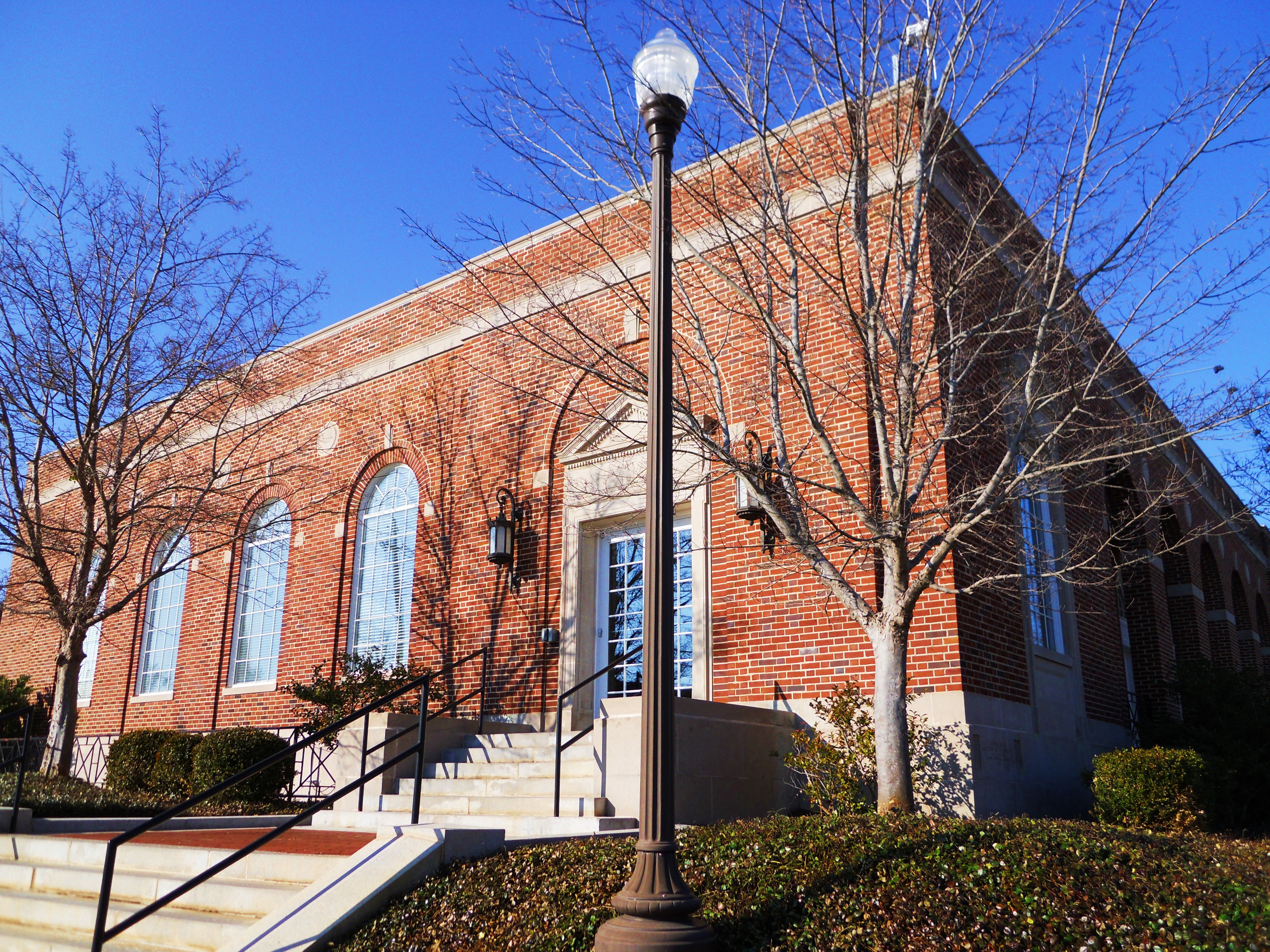

- Location within Alabama Location within the United States
- Location: 144 Tichenor Ave., Auburn, Alabama
- Coordinates: 32.6081°N 85.4802°W
- Area: 0.7 acres (0.28 ha)
- Built: 1933
- Architect: Barnes, Charles H.
- Architectural style: Colonial Revival
- NRHP reference No.: 83002979
- Added to NRHP: June 21, 1983

Auburn City Hall, built in 1933, is the city hall of Auburn, Alabama. It was originally constructed as a post office in 1933, and, like many post offices constructed during the Great Depression, the building has a "starved classical" design typical of federal architecture, with symmetrical style and pointed pediments and elements of Colonial Revival architecture. It was listed on the National Register of Historic Places as the U.S. Post Office in 1983.

== History ==
The site for the post office was deeded in 1846 by Auburn founder John J. Harper to Simeon Perry, agent for the Auburn Academy (today Auburn High School), for the use of the male division of the Academy as a separate school. In 1856, this school became the preparatory department of the East Alabama Male College (today Auburn University). After the U.S. Civil War, the preparatory division moved to the main campus of the college and the building briefly became a chair factory before Auburn High School (then operating as the Auburn Female College) took over the structure around 1870. An adjacent two-story brick structure for Auburn High School was built just south of the old school building in 1899, and the old school building was subsequently razed. When Auburn High moved to a new campus in 1915, the brick structure became the Auburn Grammar School until it was torn down in 1931 to make way for the post office building.

The City of Auburn donated the school site for the construction of a $90,000 post office in 1933, which received first class status in 1940. The building served as the post office for the city of Auburn until a new facility was constructed in 1991. In 1992, the City of Auburn purchased the building, renting the structure to the Food Bank of East Alabama, before renovating it as City Hall in 2001.

== See also ==
- List of United States post offices
