= Mary Lou Foy =

American photojournalist (born 1944)

Mary Lou Foy (born August 17, 1944) is an American photojournalist. She served as picture editor at The Washington Post from 1990 to 2006 and was president of the National Press Photographers Association in 1992.

== Education ==
Foy attended Auburn High School and Auburn University, receiving a B.A. in journalism from the latter in 1966. She attended graduate school at the University of Florida in journalism and environmental engineering.

== Career ==
In 1971, became the first female photojournalist to work for the Gainesville Sun. In 1974, she joined the staff of the Fort Lauderdale Sun-Sentinel, and in 1976 became the first woman photojournalist on the staff of the Miami Herald.

Foy rose from that position to become picture editor of the Herald, before being hired by The Washington Post in 1990 as national/style picture editor. She served in that position at the Post until 2006. Foy served as secretary of the National Press Photographers Association in 1984 and 1985, vice president in 1991, and president of that organization in 1992. She received the Samuel Mellor Award in 1984, the Joseph Costa Award in 1998, the Morris Berman NPPA Citation in 2003, and twice received the NPPA's President's Award in 1984 and 1986. In the Atlanta Photojournalism Seminar in the year 1979, had winners in each type of category, Spot News, General News, News picture story, etc. Foy was placed third in the category News Picture Story as also being part of the Miami Herald community. The Neiman Reports article Foy talks about her career and what she has experienced: "This was The Gainesville Sun. 1971. A lifetime ago. The sole woman on the photo staff and one of only four in the state of Florida shooting for a daily paper. Three years later I walk into The Ft. Lauderdale Sun-Sentinel: 'We already have one woman and wouldn’t mind having another,' said the director of photography."

Foy was passionate to chasing the news around, near, and in Florida. In the Nieman Reports article Foy mentions: "But I loved chasing news in Florida, the Caribbean and Central America and meeting deadlines on important stories like the Miami riots, Haitian interdiction, Cuban refugees." Her work was created in the 1970s and the 1980s. Therefore, her pictures were black and white. In the Flashback Miami Herald website, for example, displays photos of an older attraction that was named, Parrot Jungle. This website has photos taken from the 1980s and the names and dates of the photographers are underneath each picture. This shows who has taken the pictures. Mary Lou Foy has a picture she took in the 80's and it is now on the website to this day. She took a picture at the Parrot Jungle with two young teenage girls who seem to be feeding two parrots, and yet, the quality is still black and white. Then after a while in the 80's on the official Miami Herald website, Foy was taking pictures with color as well. On an article on the Miami Herald website titled "Eastern Airlines 'golden days' archive lands at UM", The article talks about a topic/theme of air travel. The photo was of an air plane, ready to take off. Foy was that photographer for the article.
