= Auburn University Historic District =

Historic district in Alabama, United States

- U.S. National Register of Historic Places
- U.S. Historic district
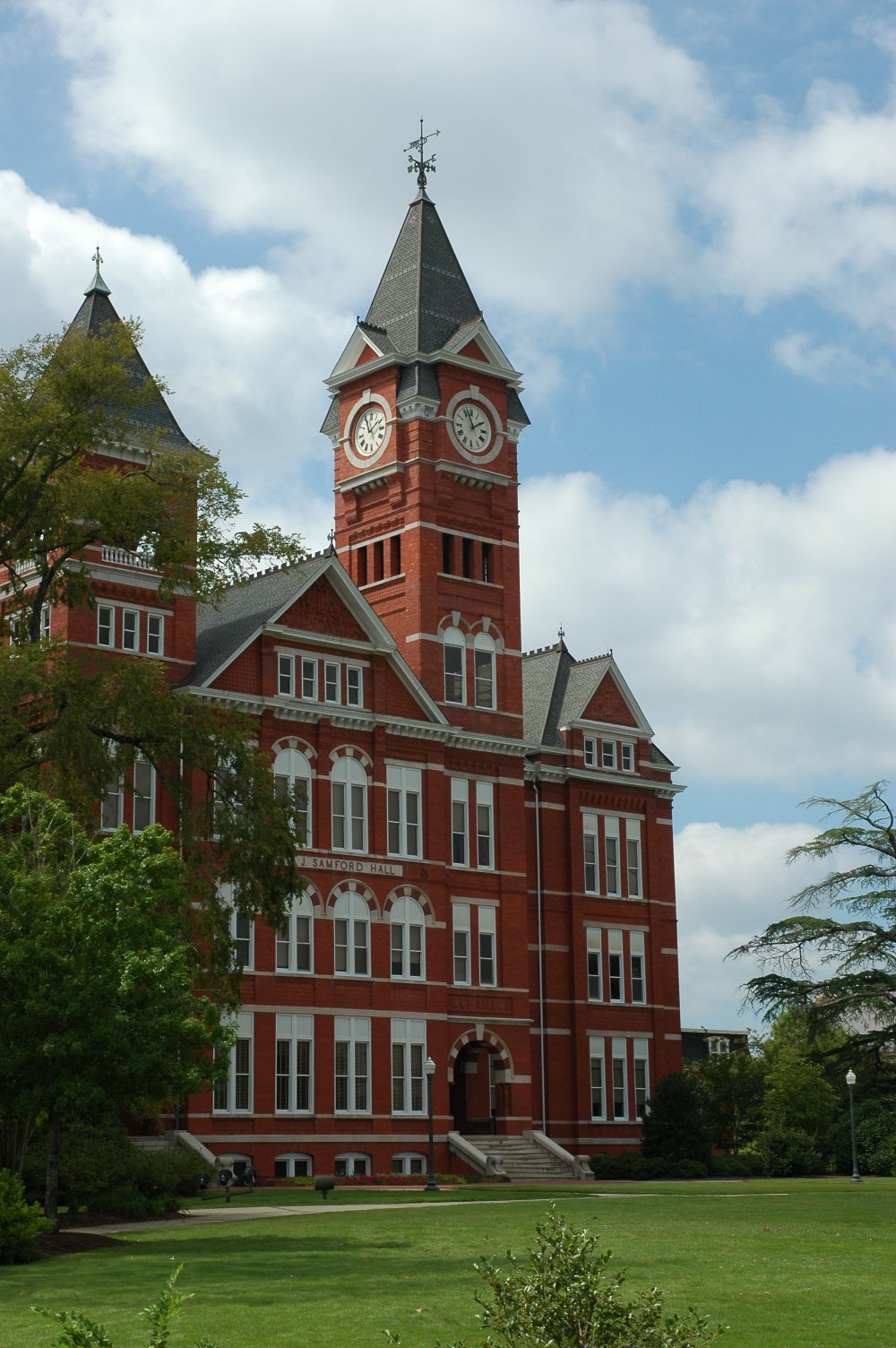
- Samford Hall

- Location within Alabama Location within the United States
- Location: Auburn University campus, Auburn, Alabama
- Area: 14.5 acres (5.9 ha)
- Architectural style: Neo-Romanesque
- NRHP reference No.: 76000338
- Added to NRHP: June 3, 1976

The Auburn University Historic District comprises the historic core of Auburn University in Alabama. The 14.5-acre (5.9 ha) district includes buildings built between 1846 and 1951, with a consistent red brick material palette.

Buildings in the district include Samford Hall (1888), The Lathe (1860s), Langdon Hall (1846), the Music Building (1887-1888), Broun Engineering Hall (1906-1910), Mary E. Martin Hall (1908), the Music Annex or Power Plant (1905), the early 20th-century Langdon Shops, and Biggin Hall (1951).

The Auburn University Historic District was listed on the National Register of Historic Places on June 3, 1976.
