= BEST Robotics =

BEST Robotics Competition
- Current season, competition or edition: FActoIds
- Sport: Robotics-related games
- Founded: 1993
- Founder: Ted Mahler; Steve Marum
- First season: 1993
- Director: Johannes Starkes
- President: Dr. Mike Bright
- No. of teams: 1000+
- Country: United States of America
- Most recent champions: 224 - St. Mark's School of Texas (BEST-Open); 91 - Trenton High School (UIL-S); 6 - United Engineering and Technology Magnet (UIL-L)
- Website: www.bestrobotics.org

BEST (Boosting Engineering, Science, and Technology) is a national eight-week robotics competition in the United States held each fall, designed to help interest middle school and high school students in possible engineering careers. The games are similar in scale to those of the FIRST Tech Challenge.

== History ==
The idea for a BEST (Boosting Engineering, Science, and Technology) competition originated in 1993 when two Texas Instruments (TI) engineers, Ted Mahler and Steve Marum, were serving as guides for Engineering Day at their company site in Sherman, Texas. Together with a group of high school students, they watched a video of freshmen building a robot in Woodie Flowers's class at Massachusetts Institute of Technology. The high school students were so interested that Mahler and Marum said, "Why don't we do this?"

With enthusiastic approval from TI management, North Texas BEST was born. The first competition was held in 1993 with 14 schools and 221 students (including one team from San Antonio).

After learning that a San Antonio group had formed a non-profit organization to support a BEST event, North Texas BEST mentored them in providing their own BEST competition. Thus, San Antonio BEST, the second BEST competition site (or "hub"), was started in 1994. The two groups - North Texas and San Antonio - decided to meet for Texas BEST, a state playoff at Howard Payne University in Brownwood, Texas. The competition has also been held at Texas A&M University, Southern Methodist University (SMU), Texas Tech, University of North Texas (in Denton) and more recently it was hosted by the University of Texas at Dallas with the competition being held in Frisco, TX. The number of SABEST teams invited to Texas BEST is based on the ratio of schools participating at SA BEST to the total number participating at all the BEST hubs that feed Texas BEST multiplied by the total number of teams invited to Texas BEST. The number of San Antonio teams varies from year to year but is typically approximately 8 teams. This is a regional playoff where BEST teams meet from around Texas and New Mexico.

In 1995, more hubs were started as word spread: Collin County BEST (Frisco, Texas), West Texas BEST (Texas Tech University in Lubbock), and Chicago BEST. Also that year, Texas BEST - the "state championship" - became an annual event sponsored by Texas Instruments and Texas A&M University.

BEST continued to grow, adding 3-4 hubs annually. In 1997, the four-year old organization established itself as a 501(c)3 non-profit corporation in the state of Texas as BEST Robotics, Inc. (BRI). Its growth continued at a similar pace, spreading throughout Texas and neighboring states (Arkansas, Colorado, Oklahoma, New Mexico) and further (Kansas, Illinois, Kentucky and California).

In 2001, BEST held its first New Hub Workshop at Texas Instruments in Dallas. This sparked an explosion of growth in the next several years throughout Alabama and the south. In 2003, BEST's second regional championship was born, South's BEST, at Auburn University, Alabama. Thirty-six teams from nine hubs in Alabama, Georgia, Florida, Ohio, and Illinois competed. Texas BEST featured 60 teams from 17 hubs in five states. BEST continued to grow as many colleges and universities began organizing hubs. The reach became wider with hubs as far apart as Fargo, North Dakota and New Britain, Connecticut. Two additional championships were added as the program expanded across the US, bringing the total to four. Frontier Trails BEST championship was established in Fort Smith, Arkansas and Northern Plains BEST championship in Fargo, North Dakota.

In 2009, the program started its bi-annual BEST National Conference for volunteers and teachers. The conference is held during the summers of odd years and provides a great place to share information. There are typically tracks regarding hub execution, technical training, design process, and other teacher training.

In 2017, BEST moved its national headquarters to Pittsburgh, Pennsylvania.

== Games ==
- 1993: PVC Insanity
- 1994: Bumble Rumble
- 1995: TOTALly AweSum
- 1996: Block N’ Load
- 1997: Dynamite Duel
- 1998: Toxic Troubles
- 1999: Rocket Race: The Alien Escape
- 2000: Pandemonium in the Smithsonian
- 2001: RAD to the CORE
- 2002: Warp X
- 2003: Transfusion Confusion
- 2004: BEST Fever
- 2005: Mission to Hubble
- 2006: Laundry Quandary
- 2007: 2021 – A Robot Odyssey
- 2008: Just Plane Crazy
- 2009: High Octane
- 2010: Total Recall
- 2011: BUGS!
- 2012: WARP XX
- 2013: Gatekeeper
- 2014: Bladerunner
- 2015: PAY DIRT!
- 2016: Bet the Farm
- 2017: Crossfire
- 2018: Current Events
- 2019: Off The Grid
- 2020: Outbreak
- 2021: Demo Daze
- 2022: Made2Order
- 2023: Incision Decision
- 2024: LowG
- 2025: FActoIds
- 2026: Byte to Bite
