= John M. Darby =

- Born: September 1804; North Adams, Massachusetts, US
- Died: September 18, 1877 (aged 72–73); New York City, US
- Education: Williams College
- Notable work: Botany of the Southern States
- Scientific career
- Fields: botany chemistry
- Workplaces: Williamstown Academy; Barhamville Seminary; Williams College; Sigourney Institute; Auburn Masonic Female College; East Alabama Male College; Kentucky Wesleyan College

John M. Darby (September 3 or September 27, 1804 – September 18, 1877) was an American botanist, chemist, and academic. He created the first systematic catalogue of flora in the southeastern United States.

== Biography ==
Darby was born in North Adams, Massachusetts, in 1804. At the age of ten, his father died, and he was apprenticed to a fuller. At the age of 23, he entered Williams College, and graduating with an Artium Magister degree from that institution in 1831. After graduation, he was an instructor at Williamstown Academy, and later at Barhamville Seminary in Columbia, South Carolina. In 1841, he published the first compilation of the botany of the southern United States in his A manual of botany, a companion work to Amos Eaton's Manual of Botany for the Northern States. He was named professor of natural sciences at Wesleyan College in Macon, Georgia, in 1842. In 1845, Darby returned to Williams College as Professor of Mathematics, but returned South a year later to teach again at Barhamville. In 1848, he became principal of the Sigourney Institute in Culloden, Georgia, a school he helped found.

In 1855, he became president and professor of natural science of the Auburn Masonic Female College—today Auburn High School—in Auburn, Alabama. While at Auburn, he expanded his A manual of botany to the more comprehensive Botany of the Southern States, and published a textbook on chemistry. In addition, he began producing and selling a patent medicine disinfectant known as "Darby's Prophylactic Fluid", which gained wide use throughout the Southeast. In 1856, he helped found East Alabama Male College in Auburn, which is today Auburn University. When the East Alabama College opened in 1859, he was appointed professor of natural science at that school, a position he held concurrently with his position at the Auburn Female College.

Darby remained professor at Auburn until 1869, when he was elected president of Kentucky Wesleyan College in Millersburg, Kentucky. In 1875, he resigned that position and moved to New York City, where he died in 1877.

== See also ==
- List of Auburn University people
