= John E. Pitts Jr. =

United States Air Force general

- Born: November 7, 1924; Auburn, Alabama, U.S.
- Died: August 9, 1977 (aged 52); Greenville, South Carolina, U.S.
- Military career
- Allegiance: United States of America
- Branch: United States Air Force
- Service years: 1943-77
- Rank: Brigadier General
- Commands: Air Force Officer Training School; International Staff, Inter-American Defense Board
- Conflicts: Korean War; Vietnam War
- Awards: Legion of Merit (2); Distinguished Flying Cross; Air Medal (3); Air Force Commendation Medal (2)

John Emmett Pitts Jr. (November 7, 1924 – August 9, 1977) was a brigadier general in the United States Air Force and was director of the International Staff of the Inter-American Defense Board.

Pitts was born in Auburn, Alabama, the son of John E. "Boozer" and Martha Pitts, and attended Auburn High School and The Citadel. While at The Citadel, he was called to active duty for service in World War II. Two months after entering the service, he was appointed a cadet at the United States Military Academy. He was commissioned a second lieutenant in the Army Air Corps in 1946.

In 1951, Pitts served with the 136th Tactical Fighter Group in the Korean War, flying 100 missions in the F-84 Thunderjet fighter-bomber aircraft and receiving the Distinguished Flying Cross and the Air Medal with oak leaf cluster. In 1952, he was a flight commander of the first mass flight of tactical fighter aircraft across the Pacific Ocean.

Pitts attended the Armed Forces Staff College in 1960 and the Army War College in 1966. In 1967, he began his service in the Vietnam War serving as director of the Air Force Third Corps Direct Air Support Center at Bien Hoa Air Base. From 1968 through 1971, Pitts served as deputy commandant of cadets for military instruction at the United States Air Force Academy. Later, he became commander of the Air Force Officer Training School, and, in 1972, vice commander of the Lackland Air Force Base.

In 1974, Pitts became director of the International Staff of the Inter-American Defense Board, a position at which he served the remainder of his career. Pitts died on August 9, 1977.

== Decorations ==
- Legion of Merit (with Oak Leaf Cluster)
- Distinguished Flying Cross
- Air Medal (with two Oak Leaf Clusters)
- Air Force Commendation Medal (with Oak Leaf Cluster)
- Combat Readiness Medal

From the Republic of Vietnam:

- Air Force Distinguished Service Order (Second Class)
- Vietnam Air Force Meritorious Service Medal
- Air Gallantry Cross (with gold wings)
