= Auburn City School District =

School district in Alabama

Address
- 855 East Samford Avenue Auburn, Alabama, 36830; United States
- Coordinates: 32°36′7.72″N 85°28′15.81″W

District information
- Type: Public
- Motto: "Inspire, Educate, Empower"
- Grades: K–12
- Established: 1961; 65 years ago
- Superintendent: Dr. Cristen Herring
- NCES District ID: 0100210

Students and staff
- Enrollment: 8,971 (2020-2021)
- Staff: 501.50 (on an FTE basis)
- Student–teacher ratio: 17.89

Other information
- Board President: Charles Smith
- Website: www.auburnschools.org

The Auburn City School District or Auburn City Schools is the school district of Auburn, Alabama, United States. The superintendent is Dr. Cristen Herring.

== History ==
=== Early history of Auburn schools ===
The earliest settlers of Auburn made the establishment of a school in the town as the first priority; before the first structure was built in Auburn, lots were sold to provide funds for the "Auburn Academy". This school, which went through several name changes before becoming what is today Auburn High School, was originally private, and private schools provided all education in Auburn until the late 1860s. By 1868, a public grammar school was operating in Auburn, part of the Township 19, Range 26 schools, holding classes in the same building as the private Auburn High. A public school for blacks in Auburn was established by 1871.

On February 17, 1885, the state legislature authorized the Auburn School District, with an elected school board and the power to levy a 0.5% tax on sales in the town limits of Auburn. This new district took over the private Auburn High School, and created the first full public school system in Auburn. A new brick school building was built in 1899, and the district was rechartered in 1901 with an appointed school board and right to charge tuition. In 1914, Auburn High School became independent of the district by becoming the county's flagship high school, "Lee County High School", but the lower grades, now known as the "Auburn Grammar School" continued under the control of the Auburn School District in the 1899 building. The Auburn School District ceased operation in 1931 when the lower grades were moved to become part of Lee County High when that school occupied the current Auburn Junior High School building.

From 1931 until 1962, schools in Auburn operated as part of the Lee County School District. Overcrowding that threatened the accreditation of Auburn High School and stretched many Auburn schools' facilities to the limit led to the creation of the Auburn Committee for Better Schools in 1959, which recommended the formation of a new city school district in Auburn to provide funds to alleviate the overcrowding.

=== The Auburn City School District ===
Superintendents of the Auburn City Schools
Name	Years served
E. E. Gaither	1962–1968
Wayne Teague	1968–1975
Allen D. Cleveland	1975–1982
Ed Richardson	1982–1995
Michael Martin	1995–2000
J. Terry Jenkins	2000–2012
Karen Teague Delano	2012–present

After an informal referendum on May 25, 1959, in which the citizens of Auburn overwhelmingly voted to favor a new city school system (521-8) and a tax increase to support the system (468-48), the Auburn City Council established the Auburn City School District on October 3, 1961. The school district began operation for the 1962–1963 school year, assuming control of eight schools from Lee County on October 1, 1962. The Auburn City School Board immediately began planning for the construction of a new Auburn High School to alleviate the overcrowding, with Auburn voters approving taxes for that purpose in 1965.

Also in 1965, Auburn City Schools began the five-year process of school integration. The first black students were admitted to Auburn High in June 1965, with four grades desegregating each of the following three years. The district fully integrated 9th and 10th grades in 1969, with the rest of the district reaching full integration by the beginning of the 1970–1971 school year.

Closure and consolidation of outdated schools brought the Auburn City Schools to six campuses by 1983. Expansion of existing school campuses kept up with growth until the 1992 construction of the Auburn Early Education Center, the state's first large public kindergarten-only facility. New elementary schools were constructed in 1998 (Yarbrough & Ogletree) and 2008 (Richland) while expansion of other campuses continued virtually non-stop from the 1990s into the 2010s.

=== Historic grade alignments ===
Grade	1961–1966		1966–1969		1969–1970		1970–1973	1973–1983	1983–1992	1992–1998	1998–2002	2002−2003	2003–2013	2013–2014	Grade
K							Cary Woods, Dean Rd., or Wright's Mill Elementary	Cary Woods, Dean Rd., or Wright's Mill Elementary	Cary Woods, Dean Rd., or Wright's Mill Elementary	AEEC	AEEC	AEEC	AEEC	AEEC, Cary Woods, Dean Rd., or Richland Elementary	K
1	Boykin St. or Lee County Training Elementary	Cary Woods, Dean Rd., Samford Ave., Community Center, Armory, or Wrights Mill Rd.	Boykin St. Elementary	Cary Woods, Dean Rd., or Wright's Mill Elementary	Boykin St. Elementary	Cary Woods, Dean Rd., or Wright's Mill Elementary	Cary Woods, Dean Rd., or Wright's Mill Elementary	Cary Woods, Dean Rd., or Wright's Mill Elementary	Cary Woods, Dean Rd., or Wright's Mill Elementary	Cary Woods, Dean Rd., or Wright's Mill Elementary	Cary Woods, Dean Rd., Ogletree, Wright's Mill, or Yarbrough Elementary	Cary Woods, Dean Rd., Ogletree, Wright's Mill, or Yarbrough Elementary	Cary Woods, Dean Rd., Ogletree, Richland (after 2008), Wright's Mill, or Yarbrough Elementary	AEEC, Cary Woods, Dean Rd., or Richland Elementary	1
2	Boykin St. or Lee County Training Elementary	Cary Woods, Dean Rd., Samford Ave., Community Center, Armory, or Wrights Mill Rd.	Boykin St. Elementary	Cary Woods, Dean Rd., or Wright's Mill Elementary	Boykin St. Elementary	Cary Woods, Dean Rd., or Wright's Mill Elementary	Cary Woods, Dean Rd., or Wright's Mill Elementary	Cary Woods, Dean Rd., or Wright's Mill Elementary	Cary Woods, Dean Rd., or Wright's Mill Elementary	Cary Woods, Dean Rd., or Wright's Mill Elementary	Cary Woods, Dean Rd., Ogletree, Wright's Mill, or Yarbrough Elementary	Cary Woods, Dean Rd., Ogletree, Wright's Mill, or Yarbrough Elementary	Cary Woods, Dean Rd., Ogletree, Richland (after 2008), Wright's Mill, or Yarbrough Elementary	AEEC, Cary Woods, Dean Rd., or Richland Elementary	2
3	Boykin St. or Lee County Training Elementary	Cary Woods, Dean Rd., Samford Ave., Community Center, Armory, or Wrights Mill Rd.	Boykin St. Elementary	Cary Woods, Dean Rd., or Wright's Mill Elementary	Boykin St. Elementary	Cary Woods, Dean Rd., or Wright's Mill Elementary	Cary Woods, Dean Rd., or Wright's Mill Elementary	Cary Woods, Dean Rd., or Wright's Mill Elementary	Cary Woods, Dean Rd., or Wright's Mill Elementary	Cary Woods, Dean Rd., or Wright's Mill Elementary	Cary Woods, Dean Rd., Ogletree, Wright's Mill, or Yarbrough Elementary	Cary Woods, Dean Rd., Ogletree, Wright's Mill, or Yarbrough Elementary	Cary Woods, Dean Rd., Ogletree, Richland (after 2008), Wright's Mill, or Yarbrough Elementary	Ogletree, Pick, Wright's Mill, or Yarbrough Elementary	3
4	Boykin St. or Lee County Training Elementary	Cary Woods, Dean Rd., Samford Ave., Community Center, Armory, or Wrights Mill Rd.	Boykin St. Elementary	Cary Woods, Dean Rd., or Wright's Mill Elementary	Boykin St. Elementary	Cary Woods, Dean Rd., or Wright's Mill Elementary	Boykin St. Middle	Boykin St. Middle	Cary Woods, Dean Rd., or Wright's Mill Elementary	Cary Woods, Dean Rd., or Wright's Mill Elementary	Cary Woods, Dean Rd., Ogletree, Wright's Mill, or Yarbrough Elementary	Cary Woods, Dean Rd., Ogletree, Wright's Mill, or Yarbrough Elementary	Cary Woods, Dean Rd., Ogletree, Richland (after 2008), Wright's Mill, or Yarbrough Elementary	Ogletree, Pick, Wright's Mill, or Yarbrough Elementary	4
5	Boykin St. or Lee County Training Elementary	Cary Woods, Dean Rd., Samford Ave., Community Center, Armory, or Wrights Mill Rd.	Boykin St. Elementary	Samford Ave. Middle	Boykin St. Elementary	Samford Ave. Middle	Boykin St. Middle	Boykin St. Middle	Drake Middle	Drake Middle	Cary Woods, Dean Rd., Ogletree, Wright's Mill, or Yarbrough Elementary	Cary Woods, Dean Rd., Ogletree, Wright's Mill, or Yarbrough Elementary	Cary Woods, Dean Rd., Ogletree, Richland (after 2008), Wright's Mill, or Yarbrough Elementary	Ogletree, Pick, Wright's Mill, or Yarbrough Elementary	5
6	Boykin St. or Lee County Training Elementary	Cary Woods, Dean Rd., Samford Ave., Community Center, Armory, or Wrights Mill Rd.	Boykin St. Elementary	Samford Ave. Middle	Boykin St. Elementary	Samford Ave. Middle	Drake Middle	Drake Middle	Drake Middle	Drake Middle	Drake or Samford Middle	Drake Middle	Drake Middle	Drake Middle	6
7	Drake High	Auburn High	Drake High	Samford Ave. Middle	Drake High	Samford Ave. Middle	Auburn Junior High	Auburn Junior High	Auburn Junior High	Auburn Junior High	Drake or Samford Middle	Drake Middle	Drake Middle	Drake Middle	7
8	Drake High	Auburn High	Drake High	Samford Ave. Middle	Drake High	Samford Ave. Middle	Auburn Junior High	Auburn Junior High	Auburn Junior High	Auburn Junior High	Drake or Samford Middle	Auburn Middle	Auburn Junior High	Auburn Junior High	8
9	Drake High	Auburn High	Drake High	Auburn High	Auburn High		Auburn Junior High	Auburn High	Auburn High	Auburn High	Auburn High	Auburn High	Auburn Junior High	Auburn Junior High	9
10	Drake High	Auburn High	Drake High	Auburn High	Auburn High		Auburn High	Auburn High	Auburn High	Auburn High	Auburn High	Auburn High	Auburn High	Auburn High	10
11	Drake High	Auburn High	Drake High	Auburn High	Drake High	Auburn High	Auburn High	Auburn High	Auburn High	Auburn High	Auburn High	Auburn High	Auburn High	Auburn High	11
12	Drake High	Auburn High	Drake High	Auburn High	Drake High	Auburn High	Auburn High	Auburn High	Auburn High	Auburn High	Auburn High	Auburn High	Auburn High	Auburn High	12

== Schools ==
=== Secondary ===
- Auburn High School (10–12)
- Auburn Junior High School (8–9)
- East Samford School(7)

=== Middle ===
- J. F. Drake Middle School (6)

=== Elementary ===
- Cary Woods Elementary School (K–2)
- Creekside Elementary School (3-5)
- Dean Road Elementary School (K–2)
- Ogletree Elementary School (3–5)
- Richland Elementary School (K–2)
- Woodland Pines Elementary School (K-2)
- Wrights Mill Road Elementary School (3–5)
- Yarbrough Elementary School (3–5)
- Auburn Early Education Center (K–2)
- Pick Elementary School (3–5)

== Gallery ==
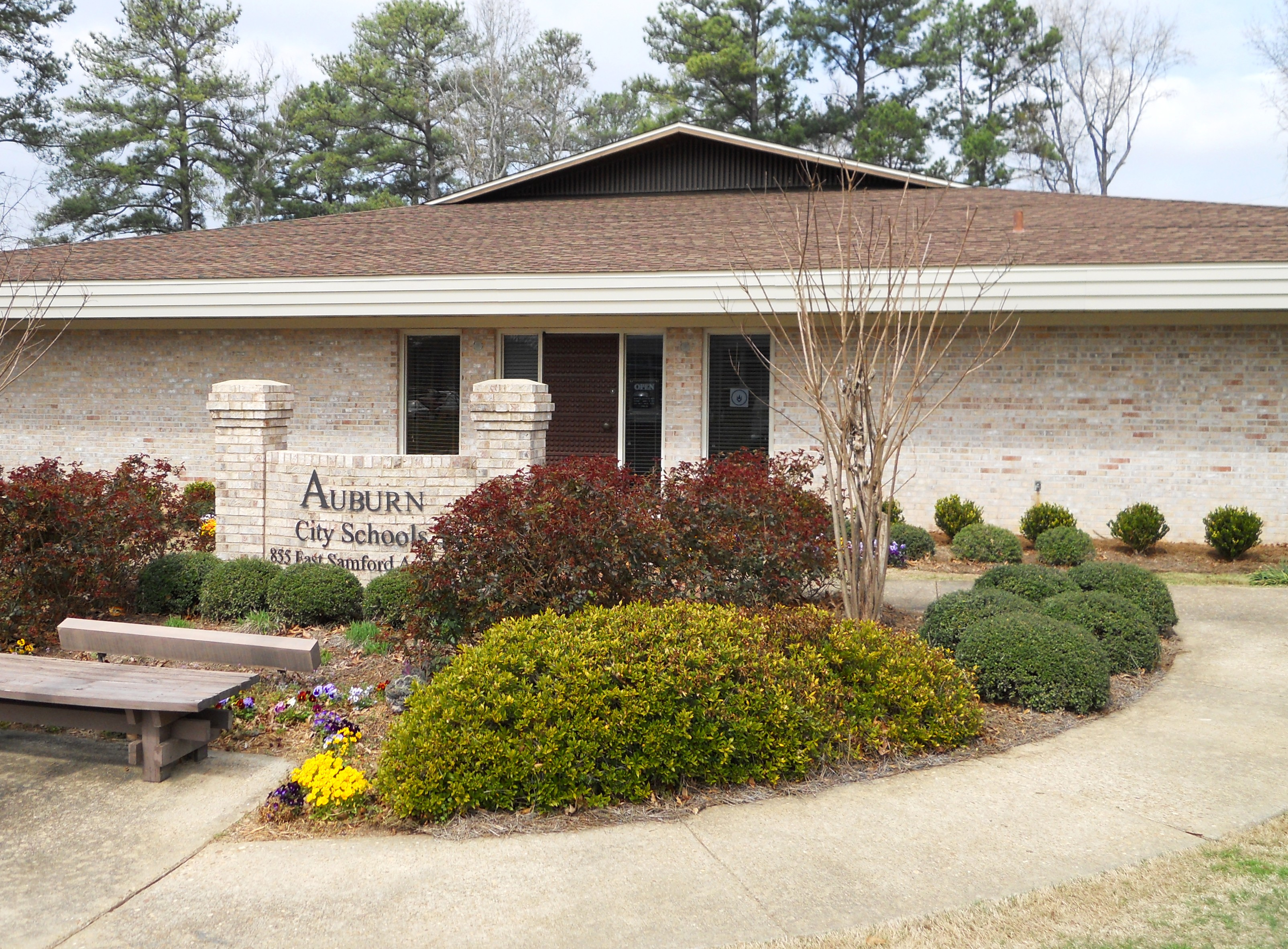
Auburn City Schools headquarters

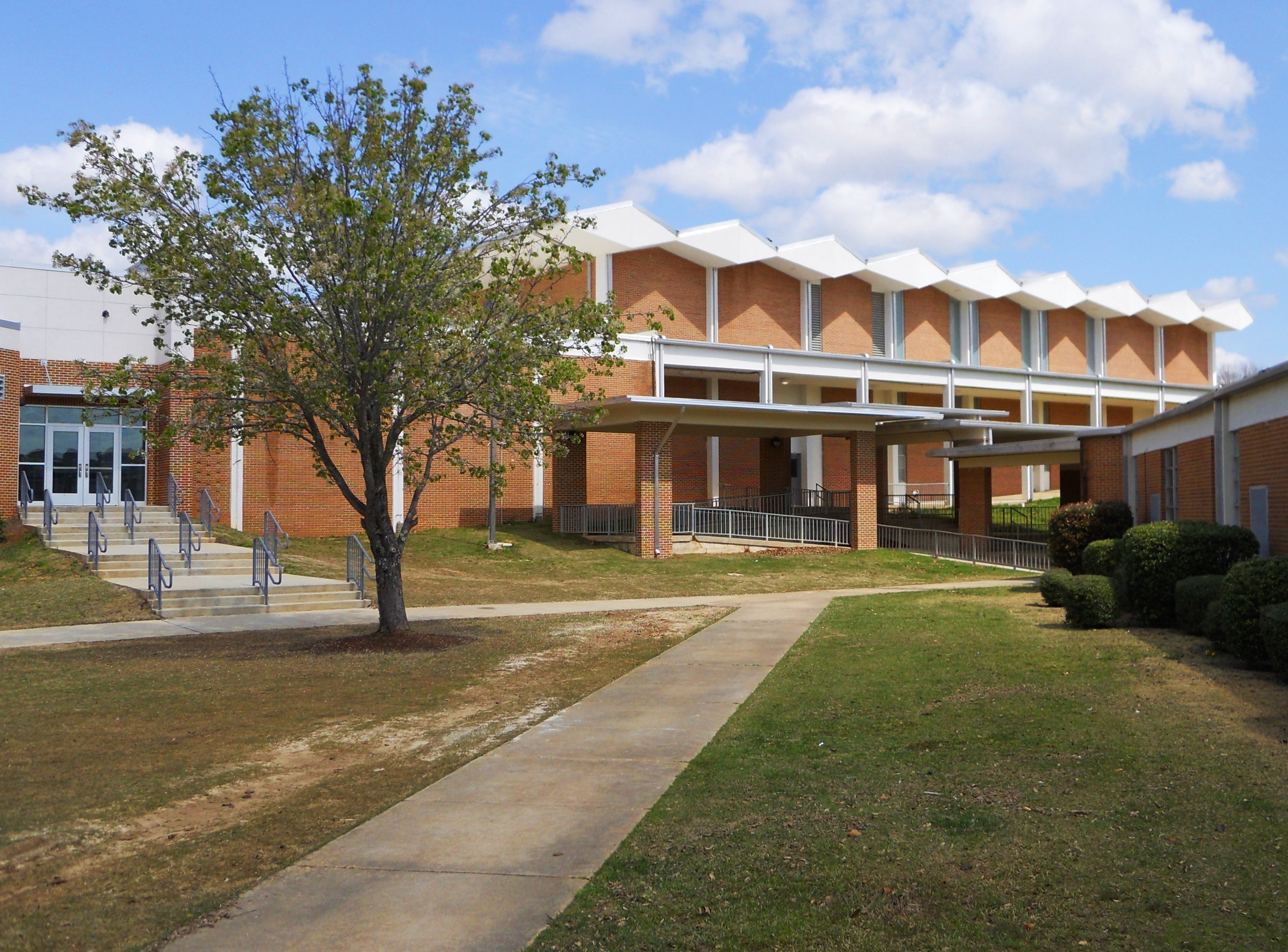
Auburn High School (former location)

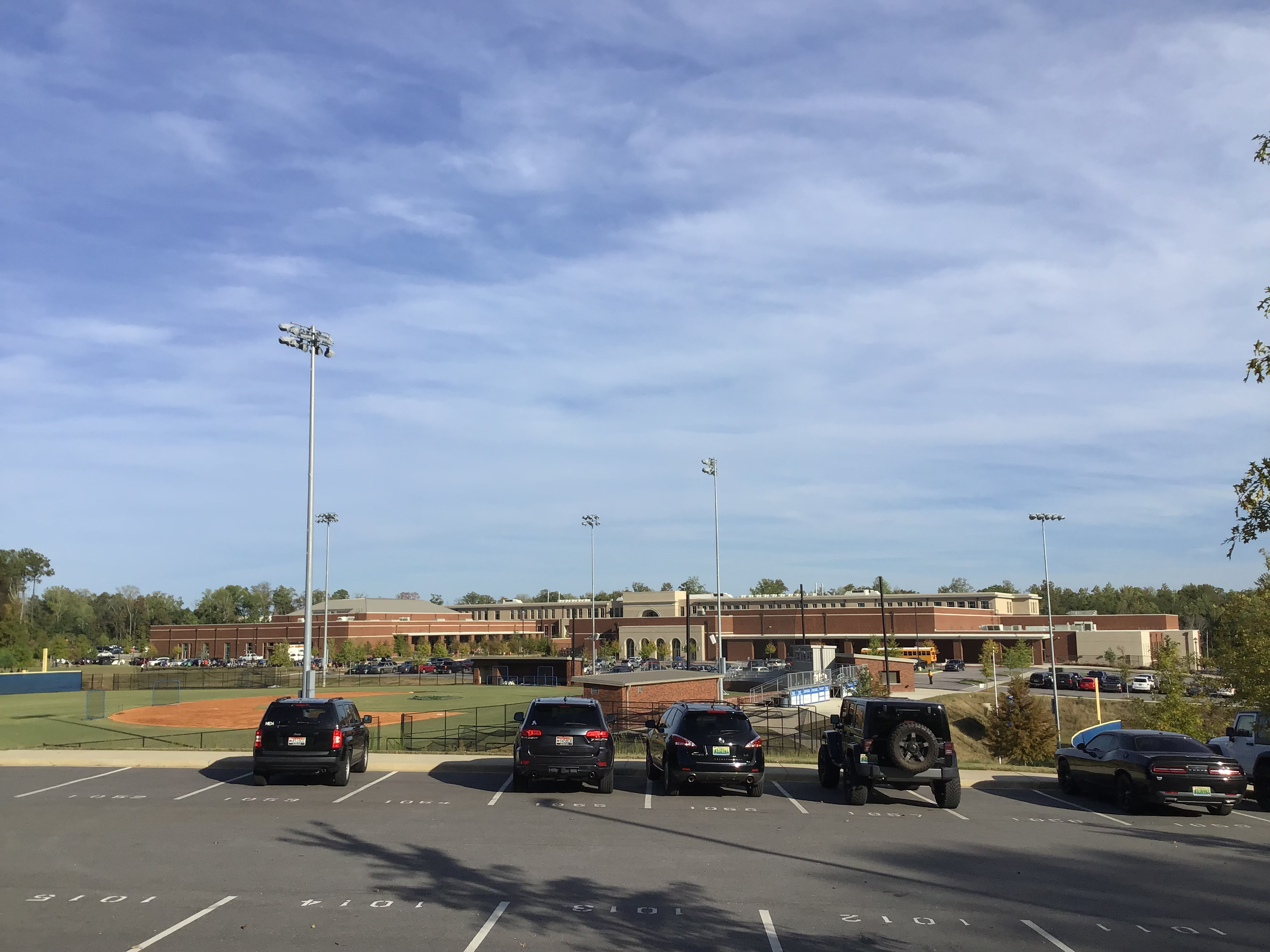
Auburn High School (current location)

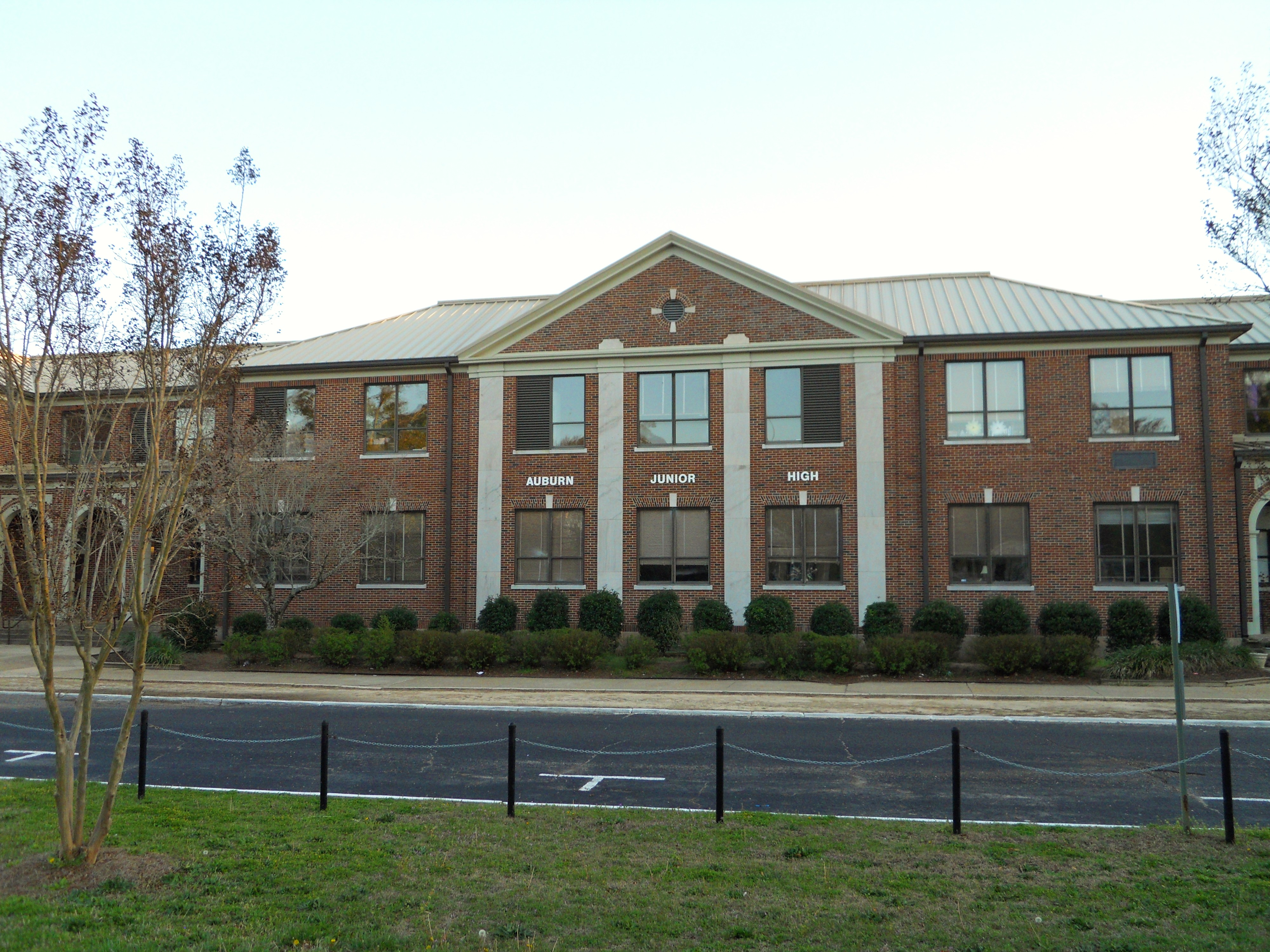
Auburn Junior High School

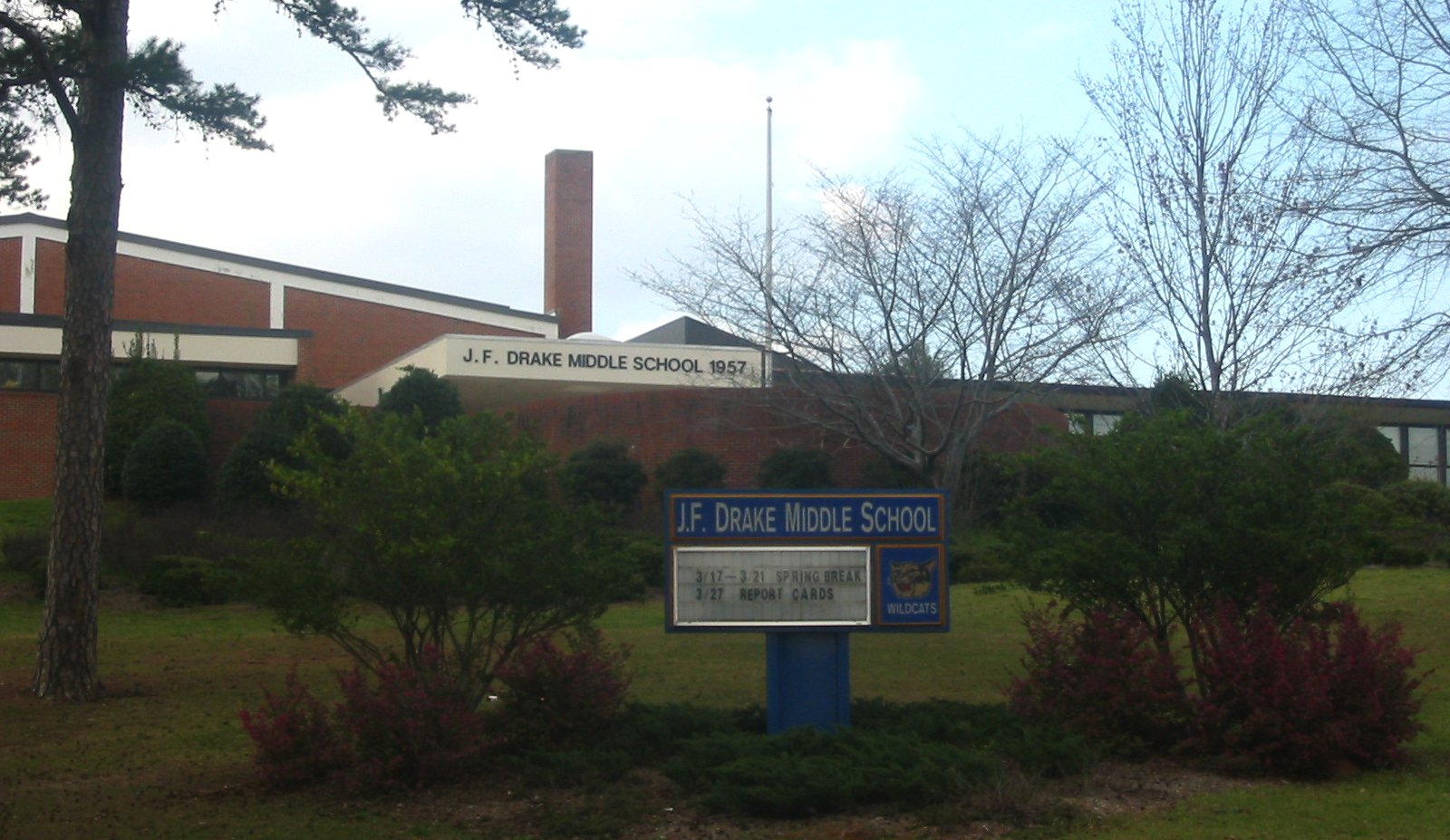
J. F. Drake Middle School

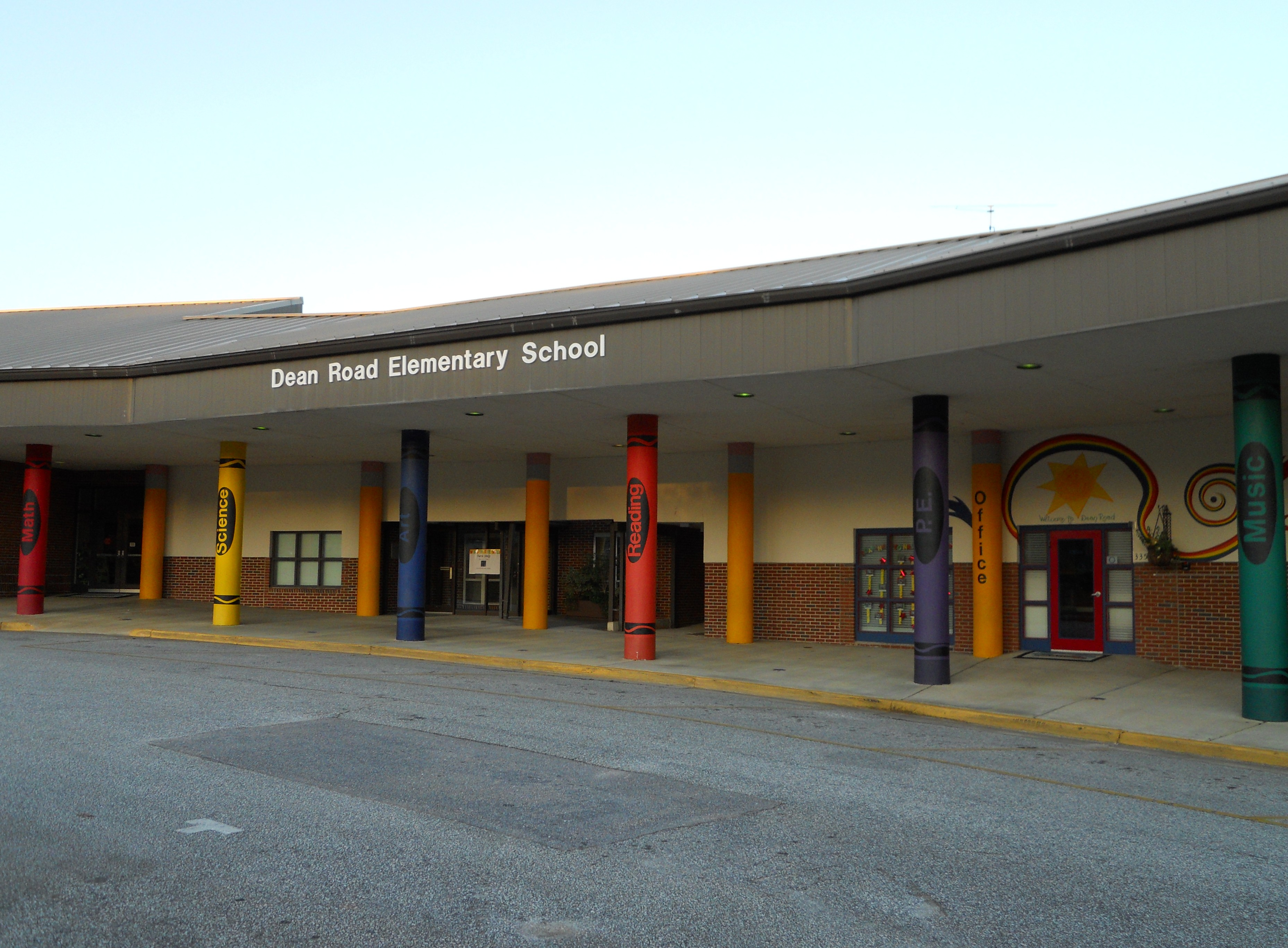
Dean Road Elementary School

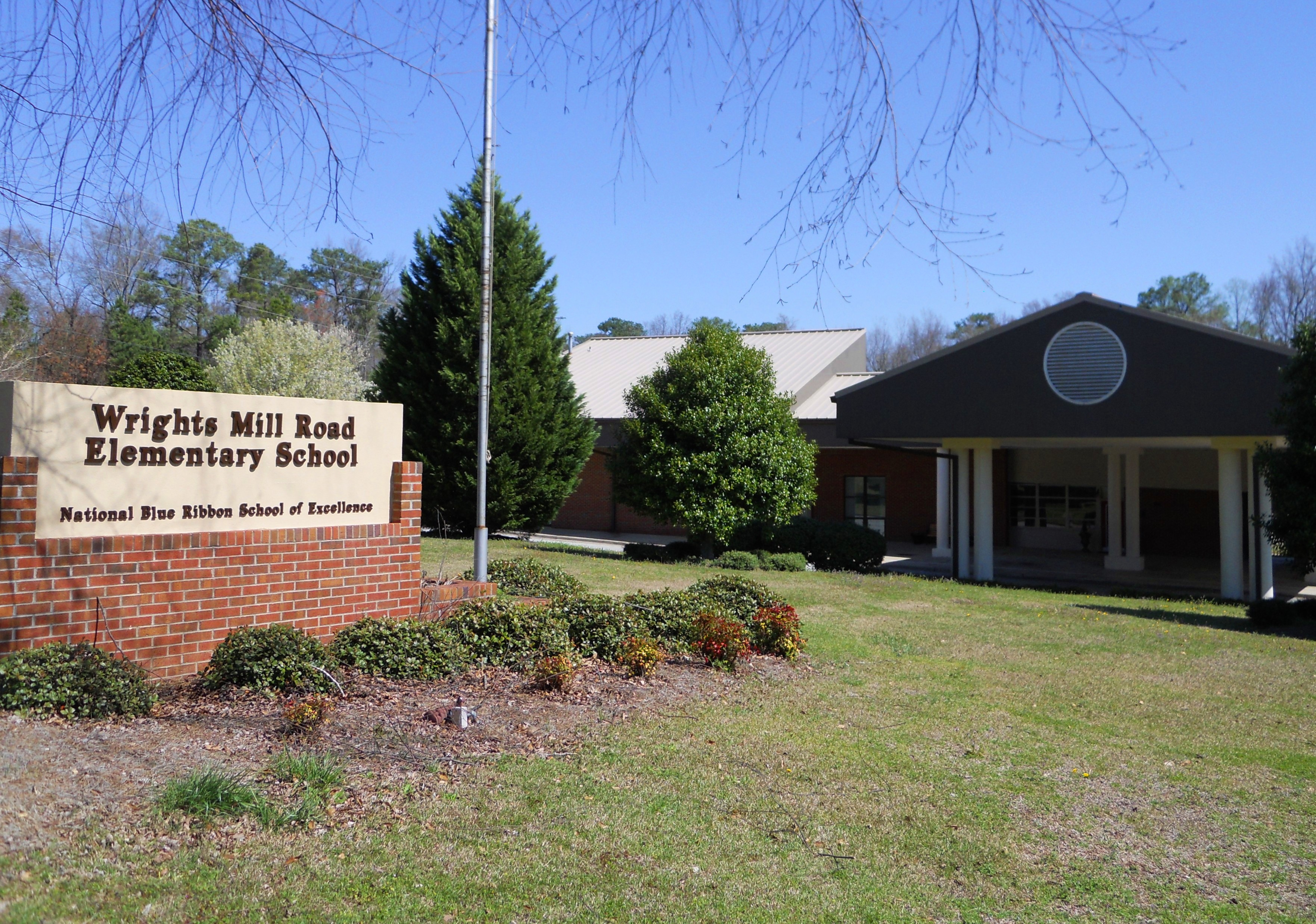
Wrights Mill Road Elementary School

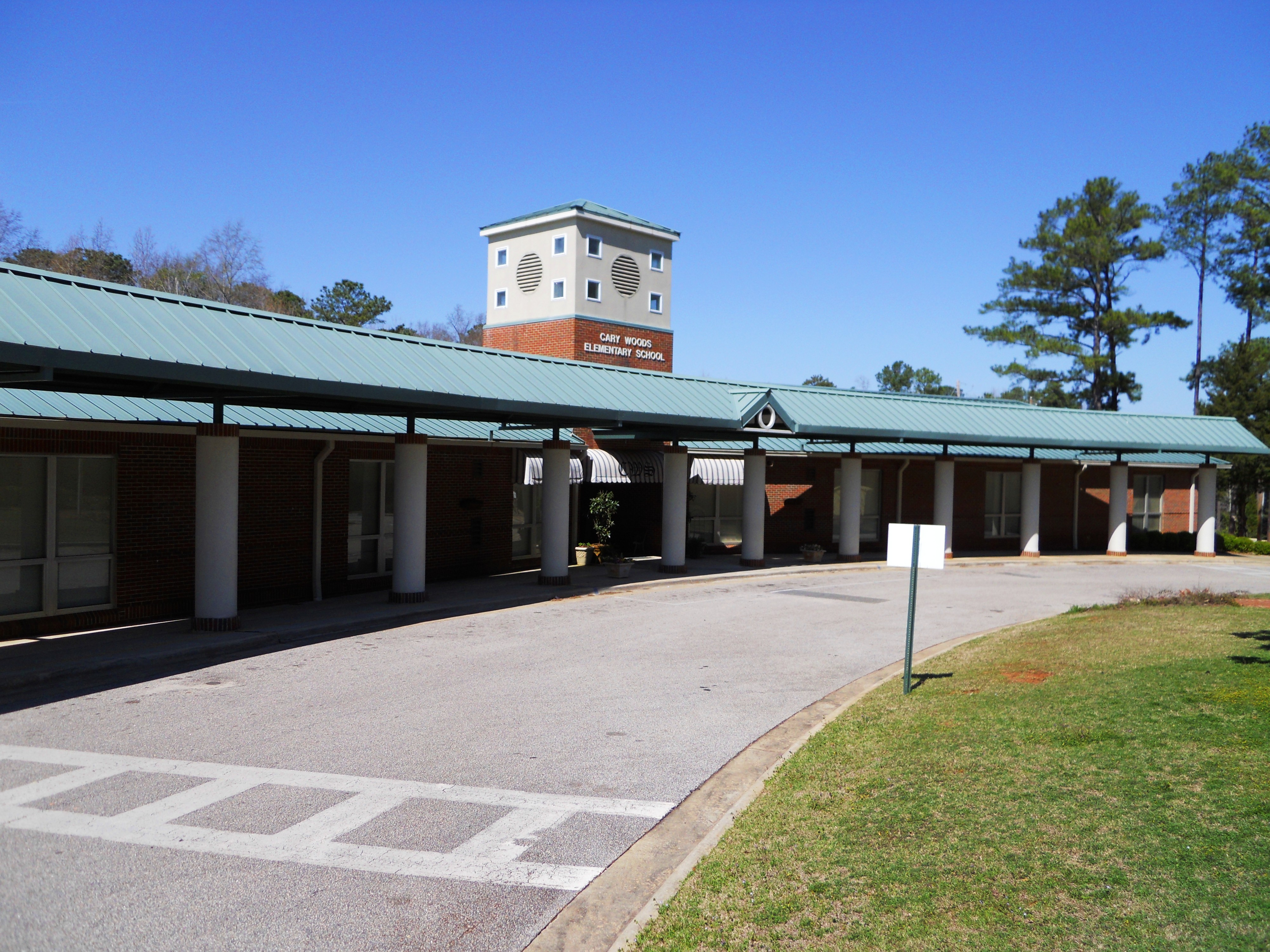
Cary Woods Elementary School

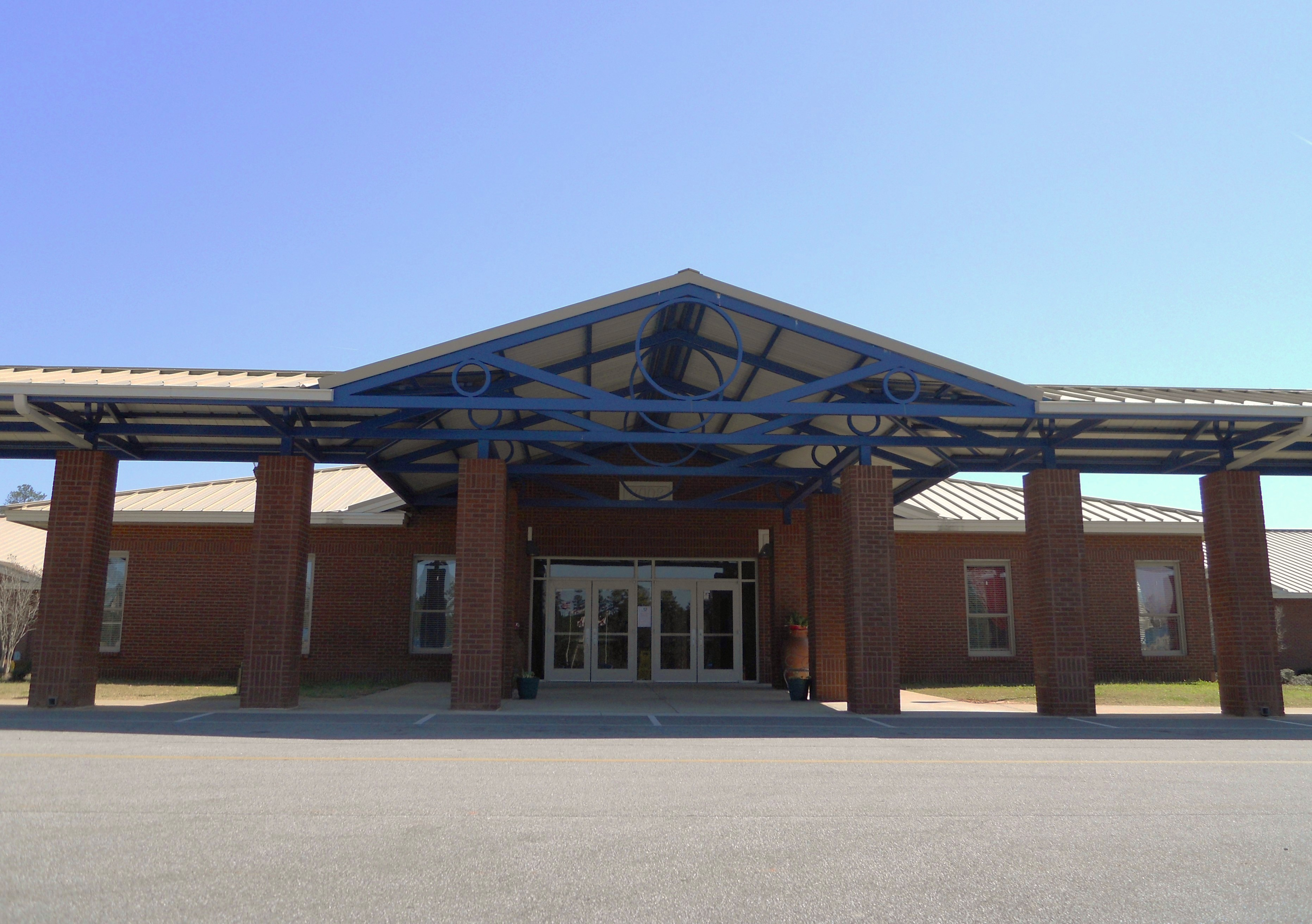
Richland Elementary School

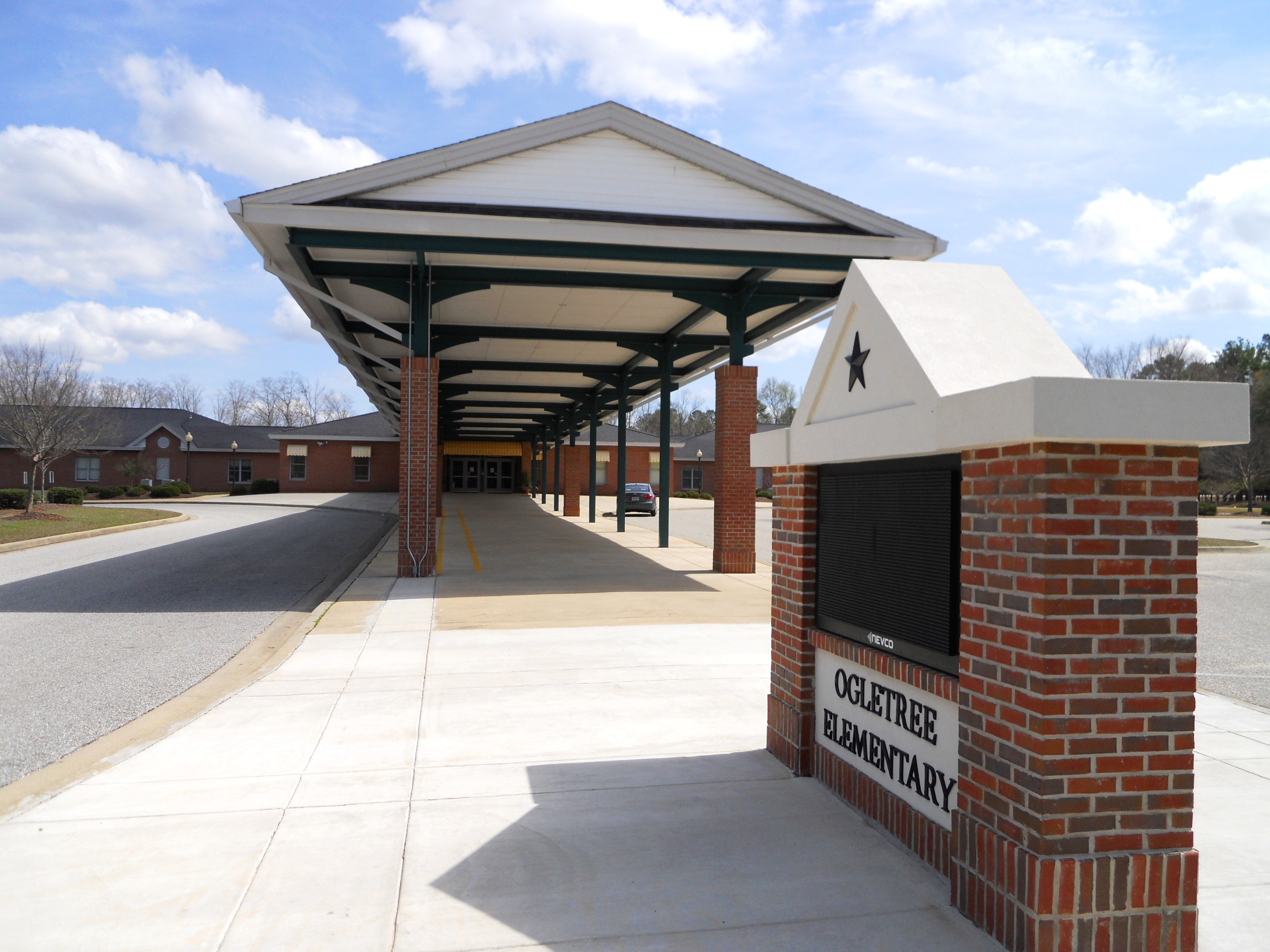
Ogletree Elementary School

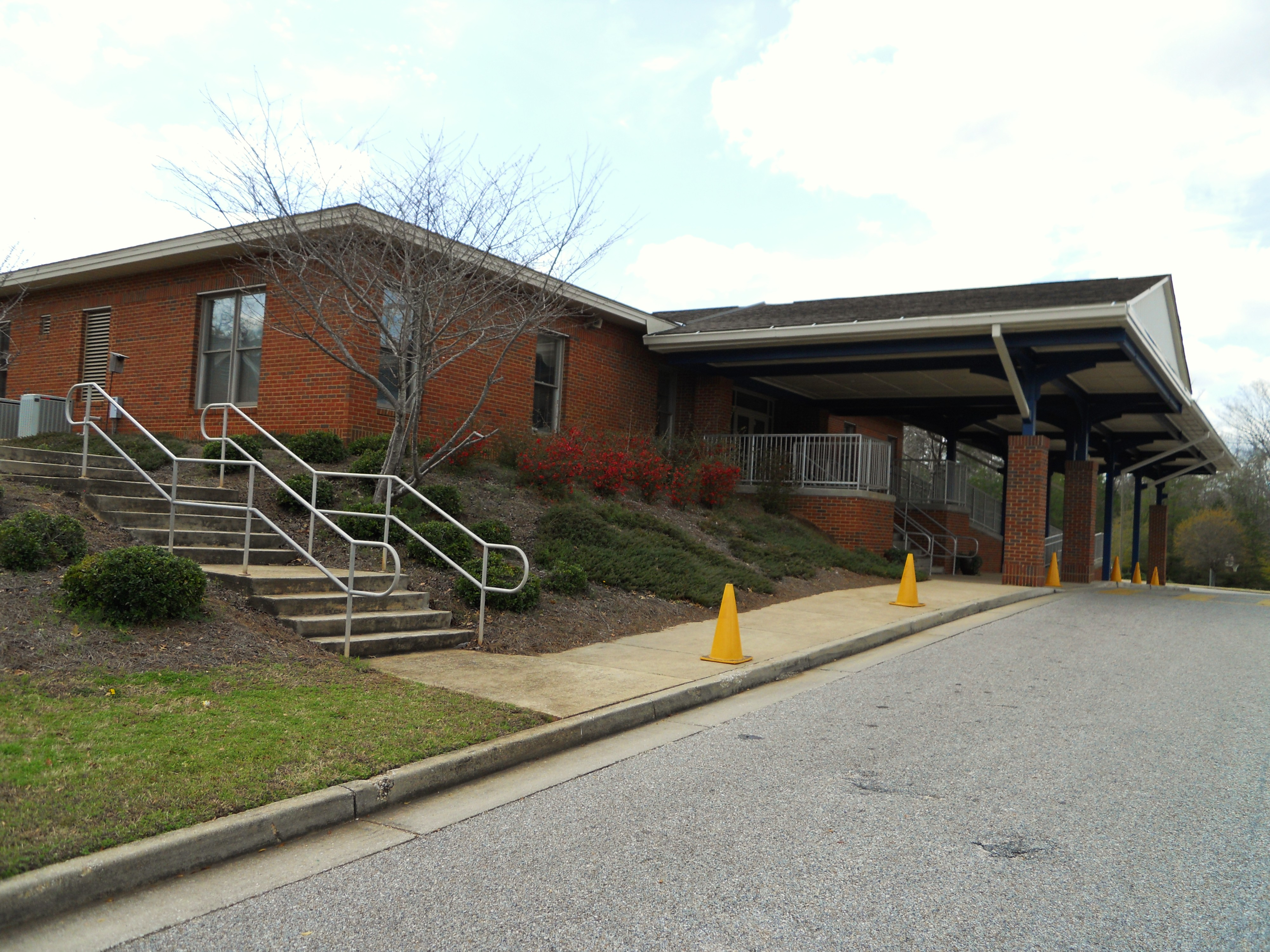
Yarbrough Elementary School
