= Samford Stadium =

Samford Stadium may refer to:

- Duck Samford Stadium, a football and soccer venue for the Auburn High School Tigers in Auburn, Alabama.
- Samford Stadium – Hitchcock Field at Plainsman Park, a baseball venue for the Auburn University Tigers in Auburn, Alabama.
- W. James Samford, Jr. Stadium, a football venue for the Huntingdon College Hawks in Montgomery, Alabama.

== See also ==
- Sanford Stadium
- Stanford Stadium
- Seibert Stadium, football stadium of Samford University
