= Ross Field =

Ross Field may refer to:

- Ross Field (airfield), a former military airfield in Arcadia, California, United States
- Ross Field (athletic), a former athletic field in Auburn, Alabama, United States
- Ross Field (sailor), a New Zealand sailor
- Ross Field, a parade ground at Naval Station Great Lakes in Illinois, United States
- Ross Field, portion of Southwest Michigan Regional Airport
