= Willie Gertrude Little =

First woman to graduate college in Alabama

Willie Gertrude Little (August 16, 1873 – May 14, 1949) was one of the first women to enroll in a state university in Alabama. In 1892, she was the first of three women to enroll in the Agricultural and Mechanical College of Alabama, known as Alabama Polytechnic Institute A.P.I at the time and now Auburn University, in Auburn Alabama. This made Auburn the oldest four-year coeducational school in the state and the second oldest in the Southeast.

== Education ==
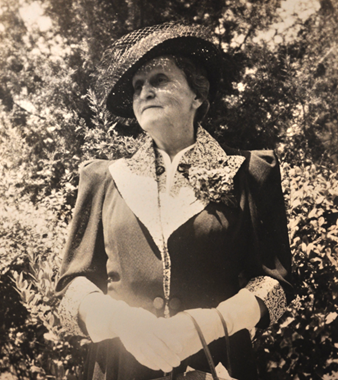
Willie Little Clark at dedication of dorm named in her honor at Auburn University, 1940.

Willie Little went on to graduate from the college in 1894 and married George Samuel Clark, who graduated from API with a B.S. in 1892 and C.S. in 1893. As such, Willie Little and George S. Clark became the first Auburn couple to marry on July 8, 1896. Willie Little Hall, Dorm 3, a dormitory for women on the campus of the university, was built in 1938 and named in honor of Willie Little.

=== Family Photo ===
Photograph taken of Willie Little Clark in 1940 at the dedication of the new Women’s Quadrangle Dorms of which Dorm 3 is named Willie Little Hall in her honor as one of the first three Auburn women.

== Biography ==
=== Birth ===
Willie Gertrude Little was born in Auburn, Alabama, to Charles E. Little (Dec 1, 1842 – Sep 28, 1928) and Maria Charlotte Felton (Aug 16, 1845 – Dec 19, 1899). She was the oldest of five children, three of which were graduates of Auburn University.

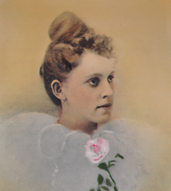
Willie Gertrude Litte

=== Matriculation at Auburn ===
On June 13, 1892, William L. Broun, president of the university, noted in his report to the trustees that, “The question of the advisability of extending the privileges of the college to young women had been the subject of careful consideration for several years.” Broun was an advocate of offering women the "advantages of instruction at A.P.I". In 1892, his daughter, Katherine Conway Broun, would join Willie Gertrude Little and Margaret Kate Teague in taking college entrance exams in English, history, Latin and mathematics. The three women matriculated together in 1892, becoming the first women admitted to a university in the state of Alabama.

After graduation from the university in 1894, Willie worked at the Auburn Female Institute as Secretary of the Faculty. Willie had been a student at the Institute prior to women being admitted to the university.

=== Willie Little and George Clark, First Auburn Family ===
In 1896 Willie married George Samuel Clark making them the first graduates of Auburn to marry.

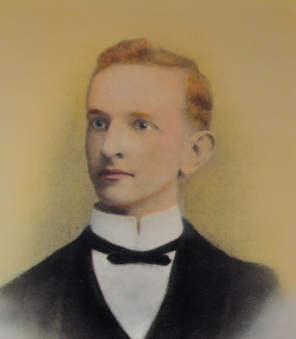
George Samuel Clark

After George’s graduation from Auburn, he served on the Auburn staff as an assistant. At the time of their marriage George had just completed an assignment as associate professor at The University of the South in Sewanee, Tennessee from 1893 to 1895. The couple had five children: George, Leigh, Charlotte, Edward, and William. Two of the children went on to graduate from Auburn (George Clark and Leigh Clark). One grandchild graduated from Auburn, Donna Ruth Clark Mackey. Three great grandchildren graduated from Auburn, Kate Marshall Dyer, Mary Mackey DeArment and W. Ken Clark. Five great grandchildren graduated from Auburn, Bobby Dyer, Marshall Dyer, Emma S. Clark, Catherine L. Clark, Amanda Bailey Windle and Lauren Bailey Esleck making them the fifth generation from the first Auburn couple and the first Auburn women to graduate.

=== The Little Family Legacy in Auburn ===
Little’s family was heavily involved with the Auburn community throughout the years. Her father, Charles E. Little, was a local merchant, businessman, farmer and the mayor of the city of Auburn, Alabama from 1892 to 1896. At the time Willie Little enrolled in the university in 1892, her father had built a fine 12-room Victorian house which still stands today at 225 North Gay Street. The house was restored in 1982 as The Landmark. Willie's brother, C. Felton Little, graduated from Auburn with a bachelor’s in civil engineering in 1906 and was the last of Charles E. Little’s children to live in Auburn in the family home. Felton donated the land for Auburn’s first park in 1947, named as Felton Little Park. Auburn High School played its football games in the park from 1949 to 1968.

=== Honoring the First Women at Auburn ===
Auburn University honored these first women in 2017 as a part of the 125 Years of Auburn Women celebration. The months long celebration culminated in October 2017 with the dedication of a newly constructed outdoor amphitheater classroom called Theatre III commemorated with a bronze statue.

The family of Willie Little sponsors a scholarship in the name of Willie Little Clark and George Samuel Clark for the benefit of students in the College of Engineering at Auburn University.
