= Auburn High School Tigers =

Auburn High School
- School: Auburn High School
- Nickname: Tigers
- Alabama High School Athletic Association: 7A
- Location: Auburn, Alabama
- Varsity teams: 21
- Football stadium: Duck Samford Stadium
- Basketball arena: Auburn Fieldhouse
- Colors: Royal Blue and White
- Fight song: "A Great Chaos"
- Website: auburnhightigers.org

The Auburn High School Tigers are the athletic teams which represent Auburn High School in Auburn, Alabama. Auburn High School's athletics program fields twenty-one varsity teams as a member of the large-school classification (7A) of the Alabama High School Athletic Association. The Tigers' school colors are royal blue and white.

AHS's track and field teams have won fourteen state championships, while the cross country squad has won eight state titles. The golf teams have won four state championships since 2004. Auburn High's women's and men's basketball teams have each won a state title, in 1919 and 2005, respectively, while the baseball squad won titles in 1986, 2009, and 2010. Overall, the Auburn High Tigers have won 58 state championships since the program fielded its earliest teams around 1910.

The Auburn High School Tigers are generally referred to as the Auburn Tigers when context precludes confusion with the Auburn University Tigers.

== Varsity sports ==
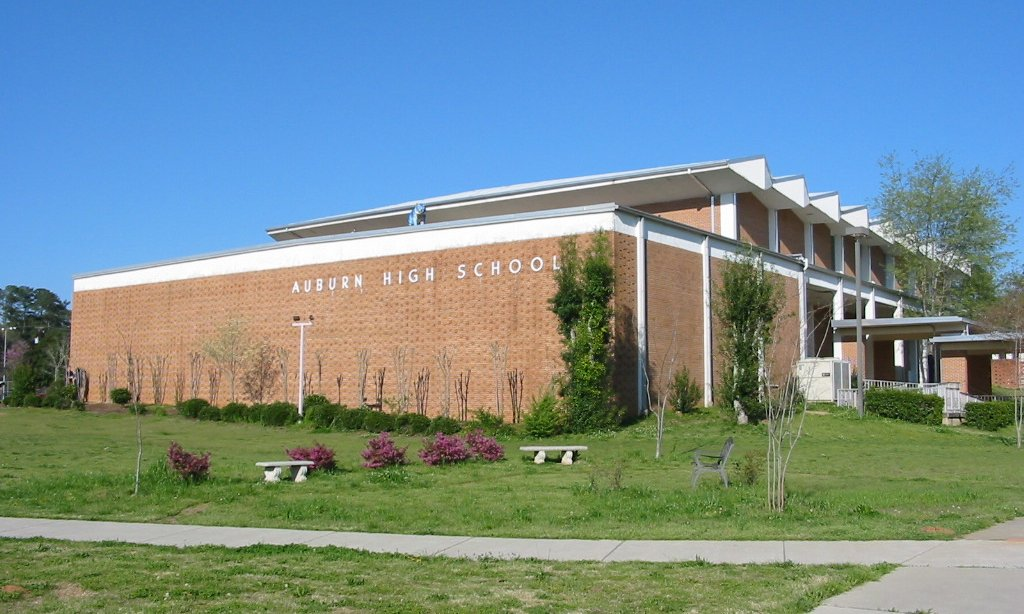
Auburn High School (former location)

Auburn High School currently fields a varsity team in eleven men's and ten women's sports. They are:

Men's sports

- Baseball
- Basketball
- Cross country
- Indoor track
- Track and Field
- Golf
- Football
- Soccer
- Swimming and diving
- Tennis
- Marching Band
- Wrestling

Women's sports

- Basketball
- Cross country
- Golf
- Indoor track
- Soccer
- Softball
- Swimming and diving
- Tennis
- Track and field
- Volleyball

=== Football ===
Football was one of the first sports organized at Auburn High, with the first game being played in 1911. In the nine seasons between 1915 and 1923, Auburn High lost only 5 of 62 games, scoring unbeaten records in 1915, 1918, 1919, 1921, and 1923. The Tigers also had unbeaten regular seasons in 1934, 1952, 2008, and 2009—Auburn's nine unbeaten seasons rank second among class 7A schools in Alabama. AHS's overall record of 558–357–33 is the second–winningest overall record in class 7A.

Auburn High's football team competes in Region 2 of class 7A along with Central High School of Phenix City, Enterprise, Jeff Davis High School of Montgomery, Robert E. Lee High School of Montgomery, Prattville, and Smiths Station high schools. AHS's primary football rival is the Opelika High School Bulldogs from nearby Opelika, Alabama. Auburn and Opelika have played 99 times, including each year since 1933. Auburn also has traditional rivalries with Central High School of Phenix City (48 games) and Valley High School (53 games). The Tigers had previous rivalries with Sidney Lanier High School in the 1910s and Columbus and Jordan High Schools of Columbus, Georgia in the 1920s and 1930s.

An Auburn High School football player

Since 2004, Auburn High has produced more All-Pro National Football League players than any other high school. AHS alumni in the NFL include Marcus Washington of the Washington Redskins (Pro Bowl 2005), Osi Umenyiora of the New York Giants (Pro Bowl 2006, 2008), and DeMarcus Ware of the Denver Broncos (Pro Bowl 2007, 2008, 2009, 2010). Auburn High's football program has produced four All-Americans: Rashaan Evans was an Under Armour All-American in 2013, Reuben Foster was a consensus All-American in 2012, and Dee Finley and Philip Yost were USA Today All-Americans in 2007 and 1999, respectively.

Auburn High has twice been ranked first in the state (in 1967 and 2009) and rose to 17th nationally in the USA Today rankings in 2009. The Tigers proceeded deepest into the playoffs in 2013, when the team fell in the 6A Championship Game. AHS has won the region, area or conference championship on twenty-one occasions since 1921: in 1922, 1923, 1925, 1926, 1927, 1929, 1934, 1937, 1940, 1948, 1952, 1967, 1972, 1973, 1987, 1990, 2004, 2008, 2009, 2010, and 2013.

The football team's home field since 1968 is 8,310 seat Duck Samford Stadium. AHS previously played at Felton Little Park (1949—1968), Auburn Stadium (1939–1947), Drake Field (1911–1920, 1935–1939), and Ross Field (1921–1935). The head coach of the Tigers is Keith Etheredge, hired in 2021, who had most recently coached at Oxford High School. Etheredge replaced Adam Winegarden, who made it to Round 2 of the AHSAA playoffs or further in all six years as Auburn High's Coach. Winegardgen left in 2021 to become the head coach of Tuscaloosa County High School. Auburn High Football games are broadcast on the radio and over the Internet by Scott Bagwell, Blake Ramsey, and Noah Gardner on Wings 94.3 (WGZZ-FM).

=== Basketball ===
Basketball was the first sport organized at Auburn High, with the first recorded men's match in the 1910–1911 season and the first recorded women's game in 1917. Two state championships have been won by AHS: the women claimed the 1919 state title, while the men won the 2005 crown. The 1919 women's squad were undefeated in–state, playing with men's rules (five-player) on outdoor courts; that team's Margaret Brown, Mary Tamplin, and Alice Beasley later led Auburn University to three straight undefeated seasons. The 2005 men's team won the state tournament with a 59–35 defeat of previously unbeaten and USA Today's nationally 2nd–ranked LeFlore.

The men's basketball program is coached by 28-year veteran Frank Tolbert, who holds a 650–315 record. Under Tolbert, Auburn has won the region championship twelve times, reached the playoffs twenty-one times, and the state final four seven times. In addition to the squad's 2005 state title, Auburn High has been state runner-up in 1924, 1987, 1991, and 1996.

The women's basketball program began sometime around 1914, but only lasted for about 15 years before being canceled amidst the cutbacks of the Great Depression. Alabama law later prohibited state high schools from fielding women's basketball teams, but a 1975 repeal of that law allowed Auburn High to bring back women's basketball in 1978. The modern program's first coach was current AHS men's coach Frank Tolbert. Head coach of the women's basketball team is Terryland Dawson. Dawson's 2007 and 2008 squads both made the state tournament regionals, having generated 26–7 and 25–5 records, respectively.

Both basketball squads compete in Area 4 of class 7A along with Central of Phenix City and Smiths Station high schools. The basketball teams play at the 1,500 seat Auburn Fieldhouse on the Auburn High campus. Basketball games are broadcast on the radio and over the Internet by Scott Bagwell and Johnathon Middleton on ESPN 106.7.

=== Baseball ===
The Auburn High baseball Tigers trace their lineage back to teams which played at least as early as 1912. A school baseball team was still playing as late as 1923, but by the late 1930s had been replaced by a team playing in an FFA league. By 1947, Auburn High again fielded a team. The baseball Tigers have won five state titles, in 1986, 2009, 2010, 2018, and 2021. They were state runners-up in 1973, 2016, and 2017.

Matt Cimo is the head coach of the AHS baseball team. Auburn High has reached the state playoffs eleven of the past thirteen years, reaching the semifinals in 1998 and 2001, the state championship in 2009, 2010, 2016, 2017, and 2021. Auburn won state championships in 2009 and 2010. The most notable player produced by the Auburn High School baseball program is pitcher Joe Beckwith, who played for the Los Angeles Dodgers (1979–1983, 1986) and Kansas City Royals (1984–1985).

The baseball team competes in Area 3 of class 7A along with Central of Phenix City and Smiths Station high schools. Baseball games are broadcast on the radio and over the Internet by Scott Bagwell and Riley Hubbard on ESPN 106.7.

=== Softball ===
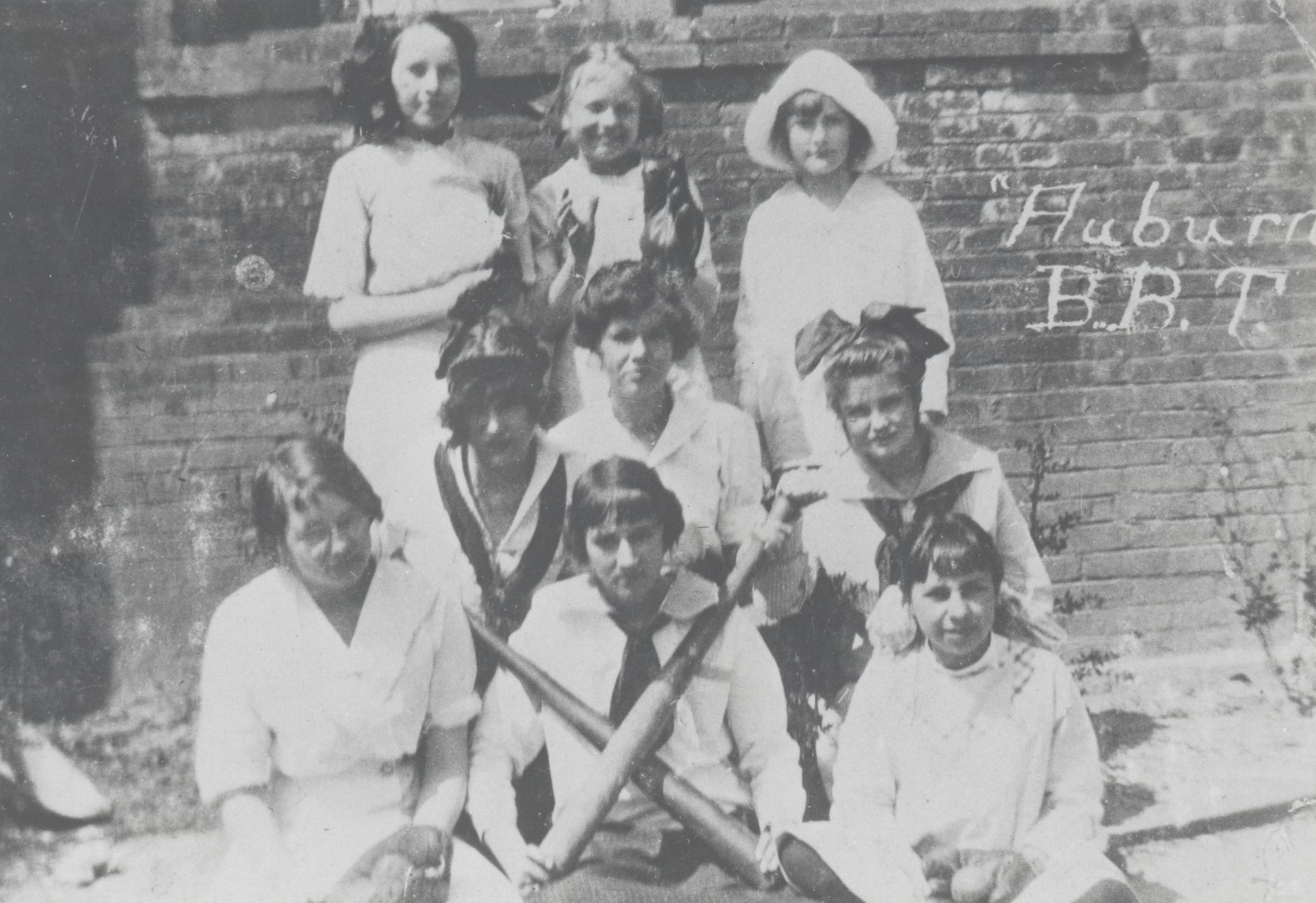
Auburn women's baseball team, 1914

While Auburn High fielded a women's baseball team as early as 1914 (see photo, at right), Auburn's first softball team wasn't organized until the 1980s. That team played in the AHSAA slowpitch league for a decade until moving to the new fastpitch division in the 1990s.

Until 2009, Auburn High softball team was coached by 15–year veteran Ed Crum, under whom the Tigers have a 393-250 record. AHS softball competes in Area 3 of class 7A along with Central of Phenix City and Smiths Station high schools. Auburn High softball plays home matches at the five–field Auburn Softball Complex The softball head coach is Chris Spencer.

=== Golf ===
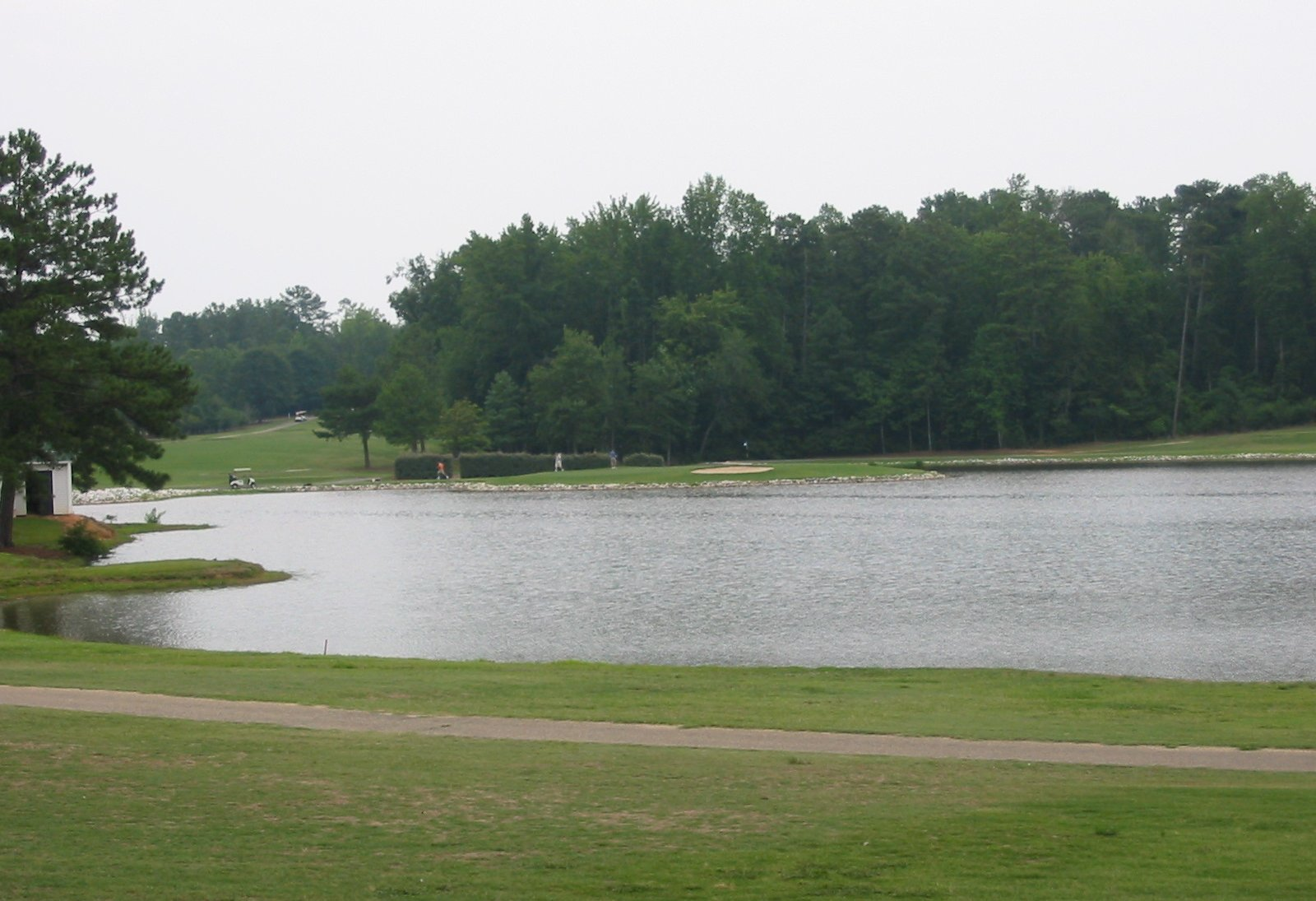
Indian Pines, Auburn High's home course

Auburn High has fielded a men's golf program since at least 1969, while women's golf, started in the late 1990s, is AHS's newest sport. The men's golf team won four team state championships, in 2004, 2005, 2006, and 2007. Under 15–year coach Duke Smith, the Tigers won nine sectional championships (1997, 1998, 1999, 2005, 2006, 2007, 2008, 2009, 2010), and were state runners–up in 1999. The men's golf program has produced four individual state titles, Bob Dumas in 1969 and 1970, John Oswalt in 2004, and Lowery Thomas in 2005.

The AHS women's golf squad won the state title in 2010, and placed second at the state tournament in 2007, 2008, and 2009, with additional top–five finishes in 2000, 2001, 2002, and 2006.

The men's golf team competes in Section 2 of class 7A along with Central of Phenix City, Enterprise, Jeff Davis and Robert E. Lee of Montgomery, Prattville, and Smiths Station high schools. The women's golf team competes in Section 2 of class 6A-7A. Auburn High's official home golf course is Indian Pines Golf Course, though the Auburn University Club, Saugahachee Country Club, and the Robert Trent Jones–designed Grand National are often used as home courses. Billy Ramsey is currently the boys golf head coach.

=== Athletics ===
Track and other running sports have been offered at Auburn High since 1921, when AHS won Alabama's first state track and field championship meet. The Tigers six track family sports—men's and women's outdoor track, men's and women's indoor track, and men's and women's cross country—have combined for twenty state championships.

==== Track and Field ====
The Auburn men's track and field team is the oldest of Auburn's track family sports, having been founded prior to 1921 and fielded continually since 1966, while the women's track and field team was first formed in 1975. The men's squad has won ten state titles: 1921, 1923, 1965, 1966, 1967, 1968, 1969, 1970, 1971, 2013. Auburn's seven consecutive tiles between 1965 and 1971 is the state record for men's track. The Auburn women's track team won the state crown in 1986. Men's and women's teams also compete in Alabama's winter indoor track season. The men's indoor track squad has won seven state titles, in 1968, 1969, 1970, 1971, 2015, 2016, and 2017. Auburn High's Steve Bear won the state decathlon in 1970.

Both track squads compete in Section 2 of class 7A along with Central of Phenix City, Enterprise, Jeff Davis and Robert E. Lee of Montgomery, Prattville, and Smiths Station high schools. Dan Norton coaches the men's team, while Ladextric Oliver coaches the women's team

==== Cross Country ====
Auburn High's men's cross country team has won ten state titles, in 1967, 1968, 1969, 1970, 1979, 1980, 2013, 2014, 2015, and 2016. The men's squad has also produced eight individual state champions: Joe Elliot in 1967, 1968, and 1969, Alvin Floyd in 1970, Sam Barall in 1990 and 1991, Patrick Gomez in 2008 and Paul Barlow in 2014 and 2015.; while the women's team has three individual state championships: Rachel Hawk in 1993 and 1994, and Tara Enebak in 2002. Both squads compete in Section 2 of class 7A along with Central High School of Phenix City, Jeff Davis, Northview, Enterprise, Opelika, Russell County, and Smiths Station High Schools. Tony Benitez coaches the men's team.

==== Track and field state records ====
Auburn High School Track and Field State Records
Event	Result	Name	Date
Men's 110 m high hurdles (6A)	13.95	Cedric Dowdell	1990
Men's 100 yard dash (Freshmen)	10.02	Robert Johnson	1981
Men's 880 yard run (Junior)	1:58.2	George Lindsey	1980
Men's mile run (Junior)	4:26.9	George Lindsey	1980
Women's 100 yard dash	10.68	Stephanie Brown	1979
Women's 220 yard dash	24.18	Stephanie Brown	1980
Men's 60 yard low hurdles (Indoor)	7.0	Grant Brown	1972
Men's 55 m high hurdles (Indoor)	7.2	Bill High	1968

=== Volleyball ===
The first varsity volleyball program at Auburn was started in 1978, but ended soon after and did not restart again until 2000. Since 2004, the volleyball team has lost only twice in area play, progressing to the state elite eight in four of the last six years. The coach of the Auburn High School volleyball program is Jan Vaughn. AHS volleyball competes in Area 3 of class 7A along with Central of Phenix City and Smiths Station high schools. The team plays home matches at the Auburn Fieldhouse.

=== Tennis ===
Men's tennis was a varsity sport at AHS as early as 1937; the women's tennis team was organized after female students tried out for the men's team in 1974. Tennis coaches are Matthew Hooper (men) and Bob Cloud (women). AHS tennis teams compete in Section 2 of class 7A along with Central of Phenix City, Enterprise, Jeff Davis and Robert E. Lee of Montgomery, Prattville, and Smiths Station high schools. Auburn High Tennis' home court is the Samford Avenue Tennis Center.

=== Soccer ===
Auburn High's men's soccer program originated as a club sport in 1976, with the first interscholastic competition in 1979. The program played its first varsity season in 1983. In 1995, the first women joined the men's squad, leading to the full-fledged addition of women's soccer in 1997. The men's team reached the state final four in 2005, 2009, and 2010; placing as runner-up in 2010. Coach of the Tiger men is Bill Ferguson.

The Auburn women's soccer team has reached the state final four for six of the last seven years: 2004, 2005, 2006, 2007, 2008, and 2009, taking the state runner–up trophy in 2008. The team progressed to the elite eight in 2003, and has won eight straight section titles. The Lady Tigers' coach is Bill Ferguson.

Both squads compete in Area 3 of class 7A along with Central of Phenix City and Smiths Station High Schools. Auburn High School soccer plays at Duck Samford Stadium.

=== Wrestling ===
Wrestling has been a sport at AHS since at least 1974. The wrestling team competes in the South Supersection of class 7A. The head wrestling coach at Auburn High is Bo Bailey. AHS wrestling had a state champion in 2016, Kalil Johnson.

==== Giambrone v. Douglas ====
The Auburn High wrestling program was also the source of historic jurisprudence in Alabama case law on the topic of State–agent immunity. In 2000, then–coach Michael Douglas wrestled a "challenge match" with student Jake Giambrone, resulting in Giambrone suffering a severe spinal cord injury which left him quadriplegic. The following year, Giambrone's family sued Douglas for negligence. Douglas, however, claimed "State–agent immunity"—that as the injury occurred during Douglas's duties as an agent of the state of Alabama in his capacity as coach, he was immune from litigation under the principle of sovereign immunity. In Giambrone v. Douglas, the Alabama Supreme Court ruled that Douglas did not enjoy State–agent immunity because he failed to follow the guidelines of the AHSAA and the National Federation of Wrestling provided to him by Auburn High officials. The limitation on State–agent immunity first elucidated in Giambrone v. Douglas has been cited in several cases since.

=== Swimming and diving ===
Auburn High's swimming and diving program competes in class 6A-7A of the AHSAA. Divers on the swimming and diving team have won ten state championships since 1988, the men's swimming and diving team placed second in the state in 1994, 1995, 2008, 2009, and 2010, and the women's swimming team was state runner-up in 2008 and 2009. Auburn shares practices and facilities with the 13-time national champion Auburn University swimming and diving program, including the James E. Martin Aquatic Center. The coach of the Tigers' swim program is Jeff Dellinger.

==== Swimming and diving state records ====
Auburn High School swimmers and divers hold four of twelve state records in men's swimming and diving and two of twelve state records in women's swimming and diving.

Auburn High School State Swimming and Diving Records
Event	Result	Name	Date
Women's One Meter Diving	452.25	Elizabeth Flint	1996
Women's 100 Yard Breaststroke	102.46	Megan Molnar	2008
Men's 400 Yard Freestyle Relay	3:16.23	Auburn	1989
Men's 50 Yard Freestyle	20.95	Ken Carson	1983
Men's 100 Yard Freestyle	46.38	Jay Beeson	1983
Men's 500 Yard Freestyle	4:32.18	Brad Dillionaire	1983

== Championship history ==
Team state championships: (77)

Baseball (5)
- 1986, 2009, 2010, 2018, 2021
Men's Basketball (1)
- 2005
Men's Cross Country (10)
- 1967, 1968, 1969, 1970, 1979, 1980, 2013, 2014, 2015, 2016
Men's Diving (3)
- 1991, 1998, 2013
Men's Golf (4)
- 2004, 2005, 2006, 2007
Men's Indoor Track (6)
- 1968, 1969, 1970, 1971, 2015, 2016
Men's Soccer (2)
- 2012, 2018
Men's Track and Field (11)
- 1921, 1923, 1965, 1966, 1967, 1968, 1969, 1970, 1971, 2013, 2016
Women's Basketball (1)
- 1919 (outdoor)
Women’s Cross Country (8)
- 2017, 2018, 2019, 2020, 2021, 2023, 2024, 2025
Women's Diving (10)
- 1988, 1989, 1990, 1991, 1994, 1995, 1996, 2009, 2017, 2018
Women's Swimming (5)
- 2013, 2014, 2015, 2016, 2017
Women's Track and Field (1)
- 1986
Women's Golf (4)
- 2010, 2018, 2019, 2025
Women's Flag Football (1)
- 2022
Women's Tennis (2)
- 2021, 2023
Women's Soccer (1)
- 2024
E-Sports (2)
- 2024, 2025

== Notable alumni ==
- Reuben Foster, UFL player for the Arlington Renegades
- Osi Umenyiora, former NFL player
- DeMarcus Ware, retired NFL player
- Marcus Washington, former NFL player
- Rashaan Evans, NFL player
- Cody Core, former NFL player

== Facilities ==
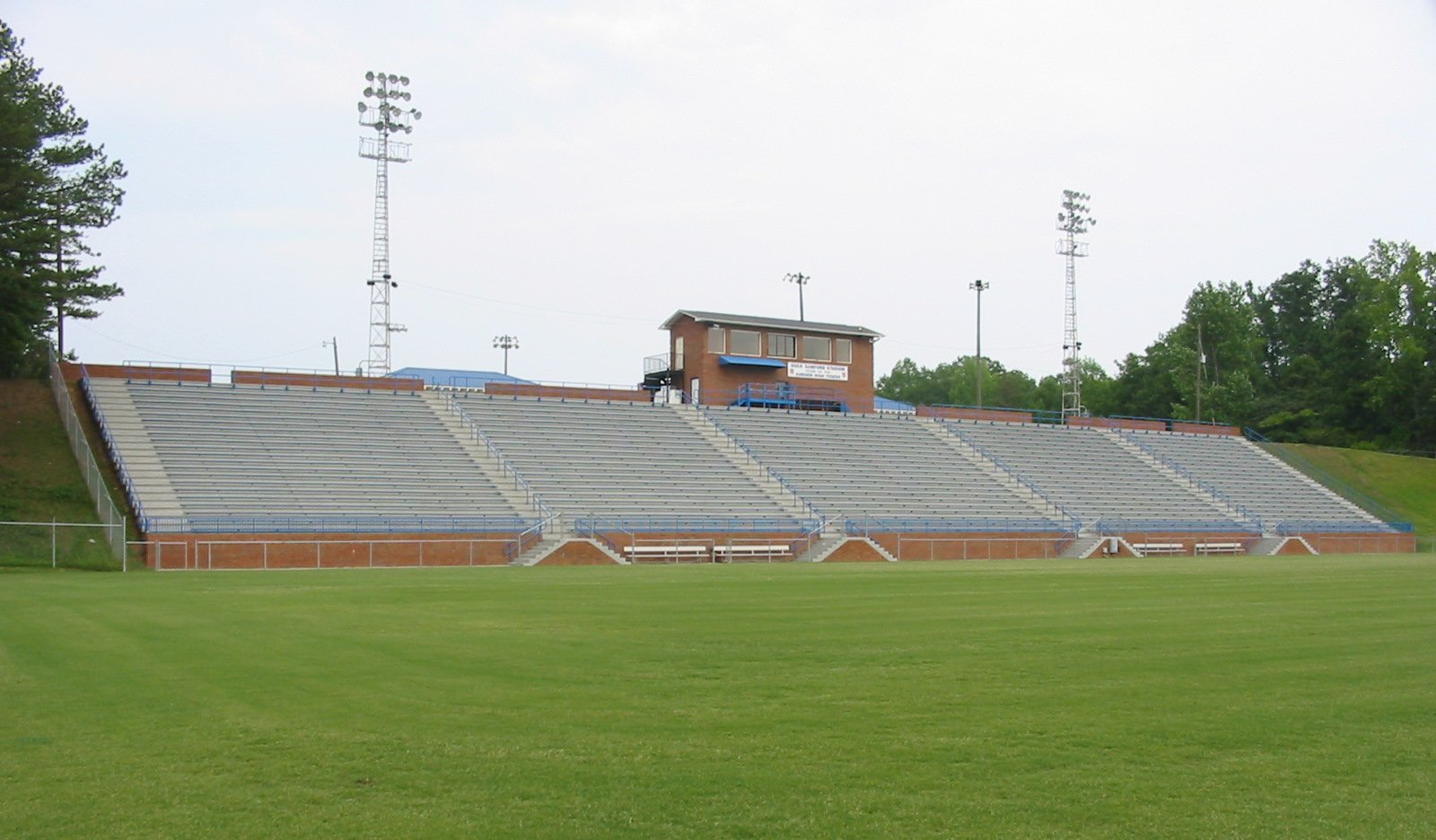
Duck Samford Stadium

Major sporting facilities and their main use include:

- Duck Samford Stadium—football, soccer
- New Auburn High school Gym—basketball, volleyball
- New Auburn high baseball field—baseball
- New Auburn high track- Track and Field
- New Auburn high softball field- softball
- James E. Martin Aquatic Center—swimming and diving
- New Auburn high tennis courts—tennis

Former facilities include:

- Felton Little Park—football, baseball (1949–1968)
- Drake Field—football, baseball (1911–1949)
- Auburn Stadium—football (1939–1947)
- Ross Field—football (1921–1935)

== Traditions ==
=== Fight songs ===
Hooray for Auburn! (Auburn High School fight song)
Music by Tommy Goff (1961)
words adapted from a public domain cheer

Hooray for Auburn!
Hooray for Auburn!
Someone in the crowd is yelling "Hooray for Auburn!"
One, two, three, four;
Who you gonna yell for?
Auburn, that's who!

Auburn High School's primary fight song is "Hooray for Auburn!". The lyrics to "Hooray for Auburn!" come from a cheer that was commonly used in the mid-twentieth century. In 1961, Auburn High School band director Tommy Goff wrote music to fit those lyrics to create the current fight song. In subsequent years, the fight song was adopted by other schools, including Prattville High School and Opelika High School. At football games, "Hooray for Auburn!" is played after a touchdown.

"Glory, Glory to Ole Auburn"—often simply "Glory"—was Auburn High's fight song before "Hooray for Auburn!" was written in 1961 and is currently a secondary fight song of Auburn High. "Glory, Glory to Ole Auburn" has the tune of the chorus of the "Battle Hymn of the Republic", while the lyrics are identical to those of the University of Georgia's "Glory, Glory" but substitute the word "Auburn" for "Georgia". At football games, "Glory, Glory to Ole Auburn" is played after a successful PAT conversion.

For the 1955 football season, Auburn High used the Alabama Polytechnic Institute fight song "War Eagle". An earlier school song, "Auburn Loyalty", was used from the 1920s through the 1940s. "Auburn Loyalty" has the melody of "Illinois Loyalty".

=== Mascot ===
Auburn High's mascot is the tiger. The tiger was chosen because of its association with Auburn in Oliver Goldsmith's 1770 poem The Deserted Village. The first line of the poem is "Sweet Auburn! Loveliest village of the plain", while a later line describes Auburn as, "where crouching tigers wait their hapless prey."

Auburn High's costumed mascot is Samford, an anthropomorphic tiger. Samford was created in 1995 and named for three symbols of the school: Samford Avenue, which runs by the school; Duck Samford Stadium, Auburn High's football stadium; and Samford Hall, the most prominent building in Auburn. Kari Pierce was the first Samford in 1995.
