= Indian Pines Golf Course =

Golf course located in Auburn, Alabama, United States

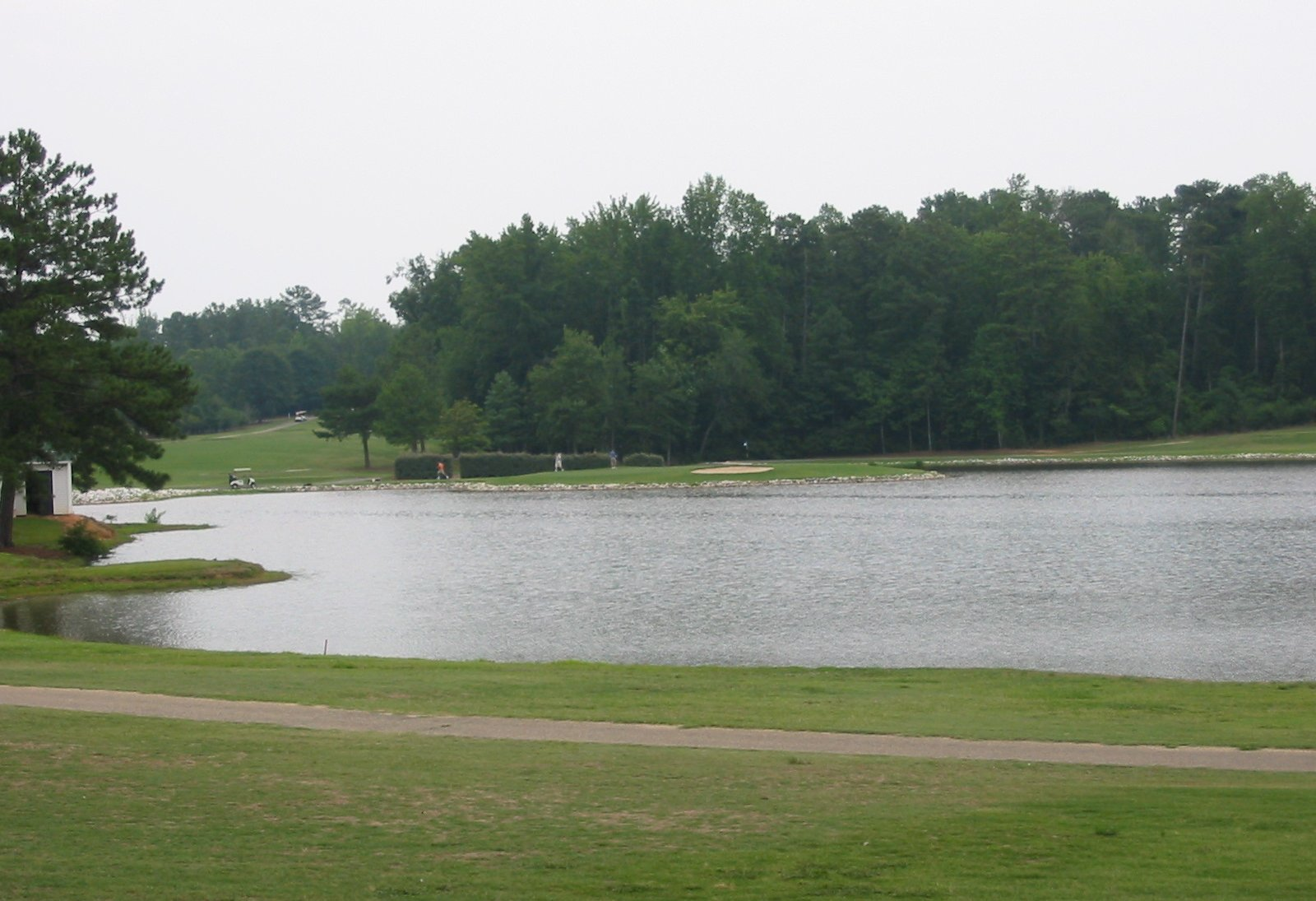
- The lake at Indian Pines Golf Course
- Interactive map of Indian Pines Golf Course
- 32°37′18″N 85°26′26″W

Club information
- Location: Auburn / Opelika, at 900 Country Club Lane; Auburn, Alabama; USA
- Established: 1946
- Type: public/municipal
- Owner: Cities of Auburn and Opelika, Alabama
- Operator: Indian Pines Recreational Authority
- Tota holes: 18
- Designed by: Eddie Loos
- Par: 70
- Length: 6213 yards
- Course rating: 68.8

Indian Pines Golf Course is an 18-hole public golf course located in Auburn and adjacent Opelika, Alabama, USA. In 2005, the course was cited by Golf Digest in their rating of Auburn as the "best golf city in America". It is a par 71 course with summer bermuda grass and a bentgrass/ryegrass mix in the winter. Indian Pines was originally constructed in 1946 as the Saugahatchee County Club, a nine-hole course, with the first tournament being held on July 4, 1947. The back nine holes, designed by Eddie Loos, were built in 1951. In 1976, the course was sold to the cities of Auburn and Opelika, which have operated it as a municipal course since. The course was redesigned in 1999. After fire destroyed the old clubhouse, a new clubhouse was constructed in 2006. Indian Pines hosts the Indian Pines Invitational, an amateur tournament drawing 200 participants and sponsored by Miller Lite. Indian Pines is the home course of the Auburn High School Tigers golf team.

The course recently underwent a significant renovation, led by the golf course architect Bill Bergin. In 2023, it was renamed Pines Crossing.
