= Drake Field (stadium) =

Stadium in Auburn, Alabama

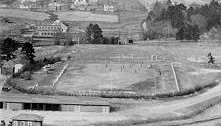
- Interactive map of Drake Field
- Location: Auburn, Alabama, United States
- Coordinates: 32°36′07″N 85°29′15″W
- Owner: Alabama Polytechnic Institute
- Operator: Alabama Polytechnic Institute
- Capacity: 7,550 (1939)
- Surface: Grass

Construction
- Groundbreaking: 1909
- Opened: October 7, 1911

Tenants
- Auburn University Tigers (football) (1911–1939) Auburn University Tigers (baseball) (1911–1949) Auburn High School Tigers (football) (1911–1920, 1935–1939)

Drake Field was an American football, baseball, and track stadium on the campus of Auburn University, in Auburn, Alabama, United States. From 1911 to 1939, Drake field was the home field of the Auburn University Tigers football team. The stadium was also home to the Auburn University Tigers baseball team from 1911 through 1949, and the Auburn High School Tigers football team from 1911 through 1920 and 1935 through 1939. It had a capacity of 7,550 in 1939.

== History ==
Drake Field was named for John Hodges Drake III, who served as the college physician from 1873 until 1926 and who donated the land for the field. The field was inaugurated on October 7, 1911, with the college football team's 29–0 win over Mercer. Two months later on the field, Auburn High School played the program's first football game, against Sidney Lanier High School, on November 25, 1911.

Auburn High School continued to play football at the stadium until moving to their on-campus stadium Ross Field in 1921; they returned to Drake Field in 1935 after outgrowing that facility. Both the high school and the college football teams moved to adjacent Auburn Stadium, today Jordan–Hare Stadium, in 1939. The college baseball team continued playing at Drake Field until 1949, when they moved to Plainsman Park. The field remained until the construction of the Haley Center in the late 1960s. Drake Field today sits on the site of the Auburn University student union.

Preceded by first stadium Ross Field	Home of the Auburn High School Tigers; 1911–1920; 1935–1939	Succeeded by Ross Field; Auburn Stadium
