= Auburn Softball Complex =

Softball complex in Auburn, Alabama

Coordinates: 32.554889°N 85.511307°W

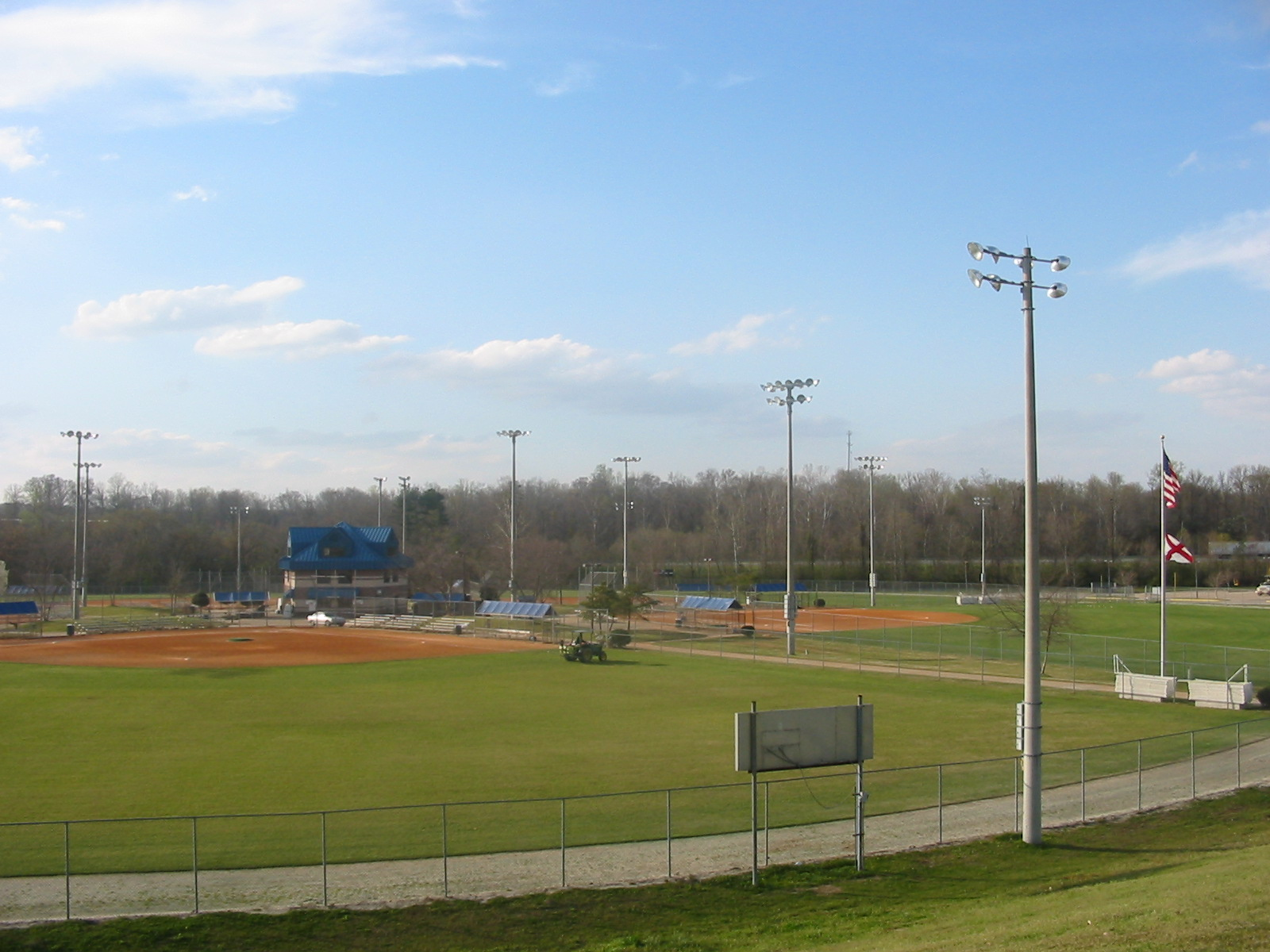
- Interactive map of Auburn Softball Complex
- Location: 2560 South College Street; Auburn, Alabama, United States
- Owner: City of Auburn
- Capacity: 1,200

Construction
- Groundbreaking: 1992
- Opened: 1993

Tenants
- Auburn High School Tigers; 1993—present Auburn University Tigers; 1997—1998

The Auburn Softball Complex is a softball complex in Auburn, Alabama. The facility is the home field of the Auburn High School Tigers softball program, and served as the home field of the Auburn University Tigers softball team in 1997 and 1998. The five–field complex has been rated one of the premier complexes in the United States by USA Softball magazine and has hosted 18 Amateur Softball Association (ASA) national championship tournaments and 11 Independent Softball Association (ISA) national championships. In 1999, the facility was named the ISA National Complex of the Year.

The Auburn Softball Complex, built in 1993, consists of five regulation softball fields with 300–foot fences, bermuda grass outfields, skinned infields, and Hollywood bases. The complex features a three–story press box and control building and covered dugouts. The facility seats 1,200 spectators and has parking for 750.

The Auburn Softball Complex has been named the Alabama ASA Complex of the Year four times, in 1999, 2001, 2005, and 2006, and was inducted into the Alabama Amateur Softball Association Hall of Fame in 2007. The Auburn Softball Complex is managed by Robby Carter.
