= WANI =

- Opelika, Alabama; United States
- Broadcast area: Auburn, Alabama
- Frequency: 1400 kHz (HD Radio via WGZZ-HD2)
- Branding: NewsTalk WANI

Programming
- Format: News/talk
- Affiliations: Fox News Radio; Premiere Networks; Salem Radio Network; Westwood One

Ownership
- Owner: Auburn Network, Inc.
- Sister stations: WGZZ

History
- Former call signs: WJHO (1940–1997)
- Call sign meaning: Auburn Network, Inc.

Technical information
- Licensing authority: FCC
- Facility ID: 63796
- Class: C
- Power: 1,000 watts
- Translators: 98.7 W254AY (Auburn, via WGZZ-HD2)

Links
- Public license information: Public file; LMS
- Webcast: Listen Live
- Website: newstalkwani.com

WANI (1400 AM, "News Talk WANI") is a news/talk radio station in Auburn, Alabama, United States. The station is owned by Auburn Network, Inc. and serves the Auburn, Alabama, radio market.

The station was assigned the WANI call letters by the Federal Communications Commission on December 1, 1997.

Logo before translator sign on

== Programming ==
The station carries syndicated national radio talk shows including "The Rush Limbaugh Show", "The Sean Hannity Show", "The Dave Ramsey Show", "Glenn Beck Program", and other national news/talk programs. Local programming includes a morning news program called "Auburn/Opelika This Morning with Bob Wooddy" and a weekly news recap show called "Auburn/Opelika This Week with Chuck Wacker".

WANI simulcasts all of its broadcasting on W254AY 98.7 FM via WGZZ-HD2.
