= Jordan–Hare Stadium =

Stadium in Auburn, AL, US

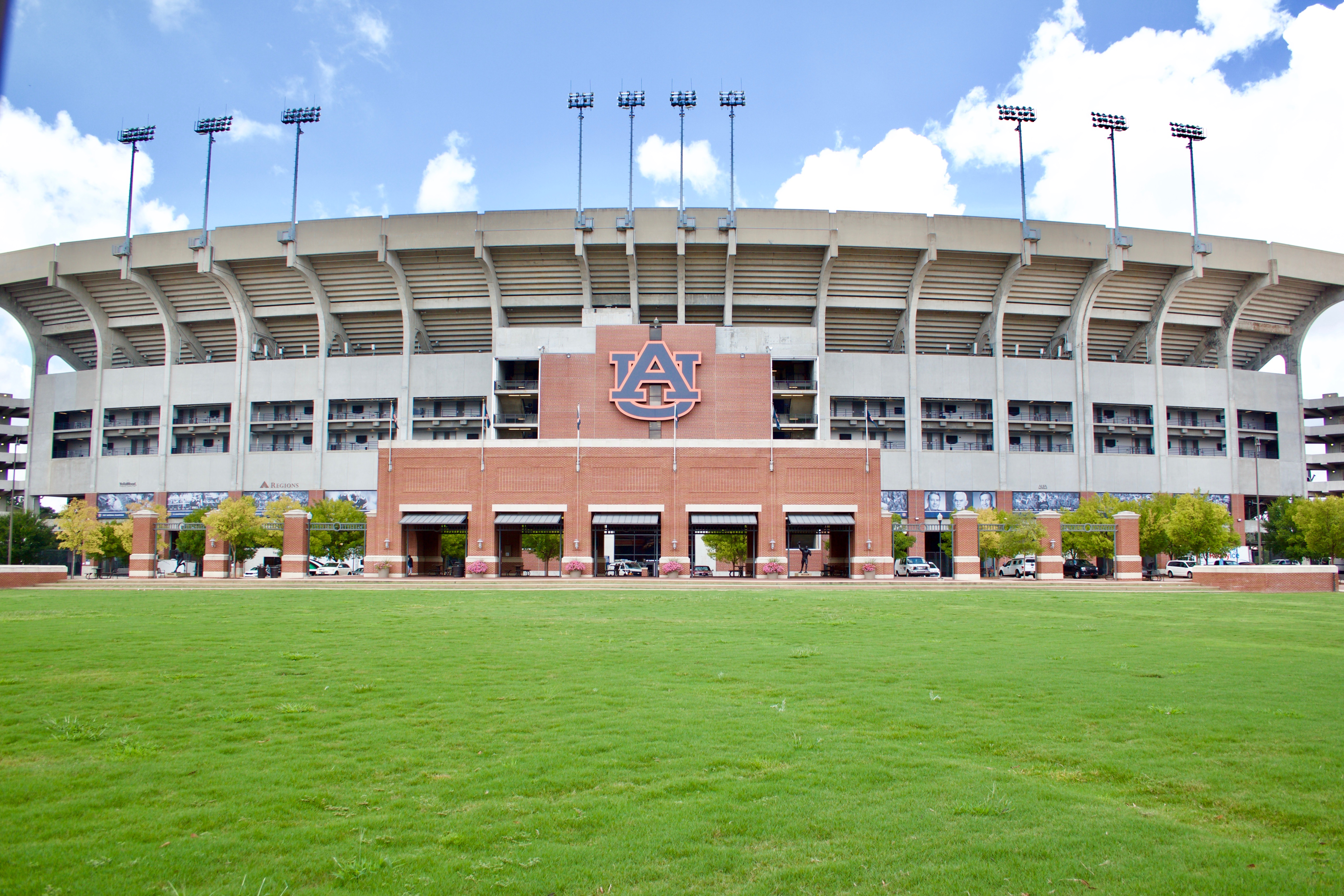
- Exterior of the stadium in 2017

- Location in Alabama Location in the United States
- Full name: Pat Dye Field at Jordan–Hare Stadium
- Former names: Auburn Stadium (1939–49); Cliff Hare Stadium (1949–73)
- Address: 251 South Donahue Drive; Auburn; United States
- Location: Auburn, Alabama
- Coordinates: 32°36′8″N 85°29′21″W
- Operator: Auburn University
- Capacity: 88,043
- Surface: Tifway 419 Bermuda Grass
- Record attendance: 88,043 (Football; Auburn Tigers vs. Alabama Crimson Tide; November 25, 2023; Soccer; Argentina vs. Iceland; June 9, 2026)

Construction
- Opened: November 9, 1939
- Renovated: 2004, 2017
- Expanded: 1949, 1955, 1960, 1970, 1980, 1987, 1998, 2000, 2003, 2006, 2007, 2011, 2015, 2018, 2023
- Cost: $1,446,900 ($33.5 million in 2025 dollars)
- Architects: Warren, Knight, and Davis
- General contractor: Murphy Pond/R.M. Construction

Tenants
- Auburn Tigers (NCAA) (1939–present); Auburn High School Tigers (AHSAA) (1939–1947); Alabama High School Athletic Association (2010–2022)

Website
- auburntigers.com/jordan-hare-stadium

Pat Dye Field at Jordan–Hare Stadium (properly pronounced as /ˈdʒɜːrdən/ JUR-dən) is an American football stadium in Auburn, Alabama on the campus of Auburn University. It primarily serves as the home venue of the Auburn Tigers football team. The stadium is named after Ralph "Shug" Jordan, who holds the record for the most wins in the university's history as a head coach, and Cliff Hare, a member of Auburn's first football team as well as Dean of the Auburn University School of Chemistry and President of the Southern Conference. On November 19, 2005, the playing field at the stadium was named in honor of former Auburn coach and athletic director Pat Dye, giving the venue the moniker Pat Dye Field at Jordan–Hare Stadium.

The stadium reached its current seating capacity of 88,043 as of 2023, and is the 12th largest among NCAA stadiums, and ranks 13th largest in the US and 21st largest in the world. It is the eighth largest stadium in the Southeastern Conference. For years, it has been a fixture on lists of the best collegiate gameday atmospheres and one of the most intimidating places for visiting teams to play.

== History ==
=== Early years ===
Before 1939, Auburn played its home games at Drake Field, a bare-bones facility seating only 700 people in temporary bleachers. With such a tiny capacity, Auburn was only able to play one game on campus per year, and frequently had to play many of its "home" games at neutral sites. By the 1930s, school officials realized that Auburn had long since outgrown Drake Field, and felt chagrin at having to play "home" games at Birmingham's Legion Field, Montgomery's Cramton Bowl, and even Memorial Stadium in Columbus, Georgia. Head coach Jack Meagher was a driving force to raising funds and building a permanent stadium at Auburn.

The stadium, then known as Auburn Stadium, hosted its first game on November 10, 1939, between the Auburn and Georgia Tech Yellow Jackets football freshmen teams. While the school was officially known as Alabama Polytechnic Institute until 1960, it had been popularly known as "Auburn" for years, and the decision to name the stadium as such reflected this. The stadium was dedicated on Thanksgiving Day (November 30) 1939 before the first varsity game played in the stadium, a 7–7 tie with the University of Florida. The Gators had to dress at their hotel in Opelika because the stadium's adjoining field house was still under construction. The Auburn-Florida game was originally scheduled for December 2, 1939 in Montgomery. The game was rescheduled in order for the stadium to be dedicated on Thanksgiving Day, Auburn officials seemingly wanting the significance of the occasion to dovetail with America's established Thanksgiving Day football tradition, a plan nearly thwarted by Franklin D. Roosevelt's "Franksgiving" decree. Had Alabama not chosen to observe Thanksgiving on its original date, the stadium would have instead been dedicated on the original date of the Florida game, December 2.

The stadium is frequently said to have opened with a capacity of 7,500; however, that was only the number of seats in the west grandstand (the lower half of the current facility's west stands). This is usually cited as the stadium's original capacity because the west grandstands were the only permanent portion of the original facility. The actual original capacity of the stadium, taking into account the wooden east stand as well as bleachers behind each end zone, was approximately 15,000—a figure that was actually quoted by a number of official Auburn sources of the day. The official attendance of 7,290 for the dedication game, as quoted by then-athletics business manager and future athletic director Jeff Beard, came from the number of tickets printed for the game. However, a thanks-for-coming note from Meagher cited the actual attendance as 11,095, and newspaper accounts reported that anywhere from 12,000 to 14,000 people were in attendance.

In the fall of 1947, Auburn students lobbied to rename the stadium Petrie Stadium in honor of Dr. George Petrie, Auburn's first football coach, who died in October that year. The first major expansion came in 1949, when the wooden bleachers on the east side were replaced with permanent seats and more seats were added to the west grandstand. This brought capacity to 21,500, and the stadium was renamed Cliff Hare Stadium.

=== Expansion ===
Shug Jordan became head coach of the Tigers in 1951. He was still coaching when his name was added to the stadium in 1973, making it the first stadium in the United States to be named for an active coach. The stadium's capacity more than tripled via three expansions during his 25 years at Auburn; it seated 61,261 when he retired in 1975. Under Jordan's watch, the stadium became a horseshoe in 1960, and a bowl in 1970.

With the addition of the west upper deck in 1980 and the east upper deck in 1987, the stadium became the largest in the state of Alabama until the 2006 and 2010 expansion of Bryant–Denny Stadium (capacity 101,821) at Alabama.

For much of its history, Auburn played home football games against their traditional rivals at neutral sites. This was partially due to the larger capacity and better amenities available at other stadiums but also due to the lack of accommodations and relative difficulty in traveling to Auburn before the city's explosive growth in the past few decades. For instance, at the time the stadium opened, there were only two gas stations in town with public restrooms. In its first decade after the stadium opened, Auburn only played a total of 12 true home games. Until 1960, all games against Georgia continued to be played at Memorial Stadium in nearby Columbus. Until the 1970s, Auburn played all home games against Tennessee and Georgia Tech at Legion Field in Birmingham.

=== The Iron Bowl Comes Home ===
As Auburn became more accessible and the stadium expanded in capacity, the Tigers gradually moved their more important games to Jordan–Hare. Georgia Tech first came to the Plains in 1970, while Tennessee came to Auburn for the first time in 1974. By the 1980s, Alabama was Auburn's last major rival to have never played a true road game in Auburn. The yearly Iron Bowl clash between Alabama and Auburn had been played at Legion Field since it was renewed on a permanent basis in 1948. Initially, it made sense to play the Iron Bowl at Legion Field. Well into the 1970s, neither Jordan-Hare nor Alabama's Bryant–Denny Stadium had nearly enough seats to accommodate the crowds attending the game. At its height, Legion Field seated over 20,000 more people than Jordan-Hare.

From the 1970s onward, however, Auburn fans increasingly felt chagrin at facing Alabama in Birmingham, particularly after the 1980s expansions allowed Jordan-Hare's capacity to eclipse that of Legion Field by over 2,000 seats. Iron Bowl tickets were split evenly between the two teams, with Auburn as the nominal home team in odd-numbered years. Despite this, many Auburn fans did not consider Legion Field a true neutral site. It had long been associated with Alabama football, even though Auburn played some home games there well into the 1970s. Indeed, until the 1980s, most of Alabama's "home" football history took place in Birmingham, which was only 45 minutes east of Alabama's campus in Tuscaloosa.

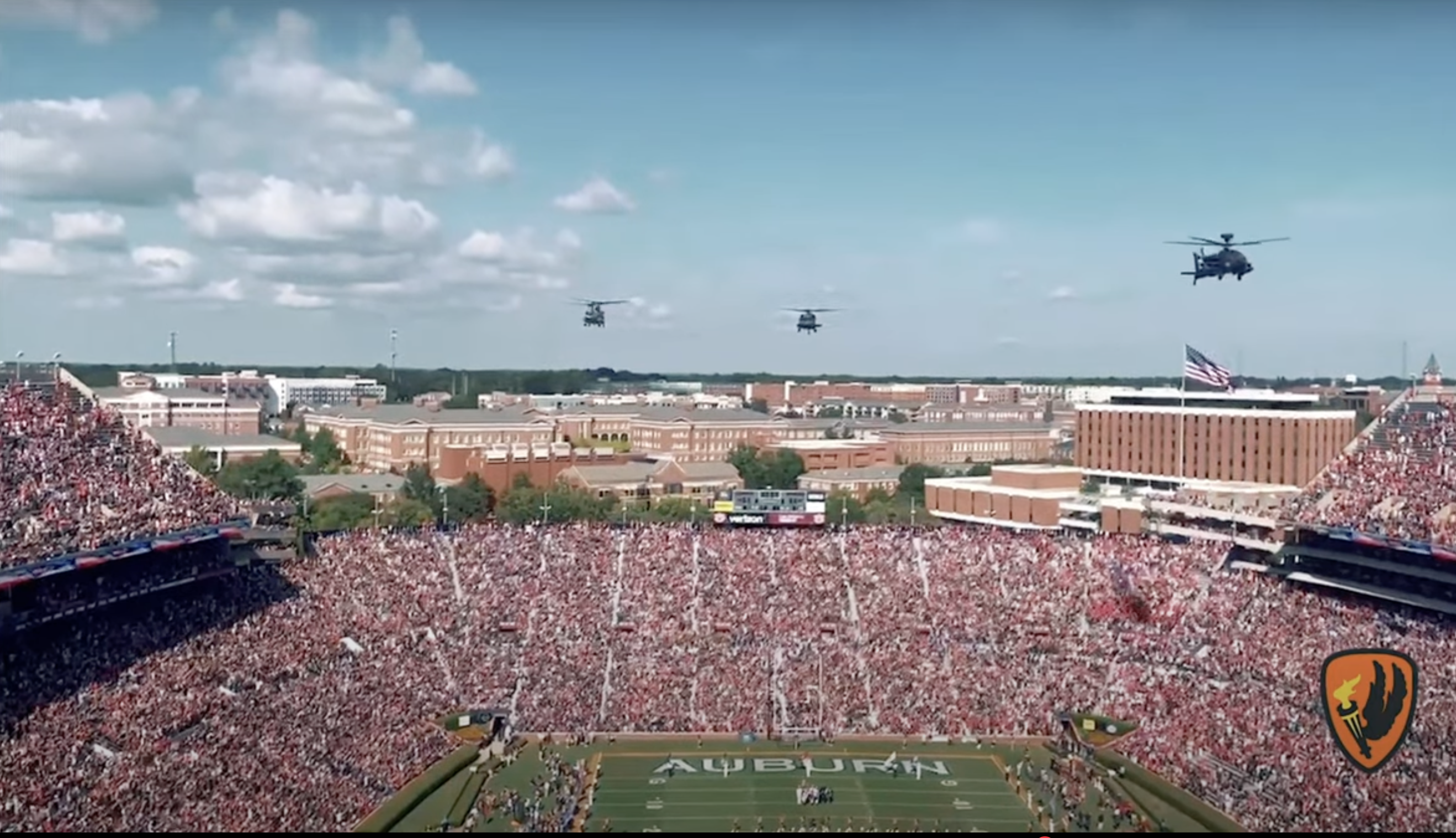
A military flyover of the stadium prior to a 2021 game.

By the time Dye became head coach and athletic director at Auburn in 1981, calls to make the Iron Bowl a home-and-home series, or at least to allow Auburn to host its home games on the Plains in odd-numbered years, had grown to a fever pitch. Years later, Dye recalled that almost as soon as he sat down for the first time as head coach with his former mentor, legendary Crimson Tide head coach and athletic director Paul "Bear" Bryant, Bryant mused, "Well, I guess you're going to want to take that game to Auburn." Dye confirmed that hunch, saying, "We're going to take it to Auburn." Bryant noted that Alabama and Auburn's contract with the city of Birmingham ran through 1988, prompting Dye to reply, "Well, we'll play '89 in Auburn." Dye would have been well within his rights to move Auburn's home games for the Iron Bowl to Jordan-Hare as early as 1983. However, he knew that Bryant adamantly opposed playing any games in Auburn. Bryant's standing in the state was such that Dye knew it would be folly to attempt making the Iron Bowl a home-and-home series as long as Bryant was still alive.

After years of negotiations, the two schools agreed to play the Iron Bowl in Auburn in odd-numbered years. True to Dye's word, Alabama first came to the Plains on December 2, 1989, six years after Bryant's death. That game that saw #11 Auburn upend undefeated and #2 Alabama 30–20. The 1991 game was played at Legion Field but has been played at Auburn in every odd-numbered year since. Alabama continued to play its home games for the rivalry at Legion Field until 1998. In 2000, the Iron Bowl became a true home-and-home series, as it was played in Tuscaloosa for the first time in 99 years. The 17th-ranked Tigers won that game, shutting out the then-unranked Crimson Tide 9-0. The most recent Auburn victory in Tuscaloosa was in 2010.

=== Modern era improvements ===
Jordan-Hare has undergone four modest expansions in the 21st century. Small areas of additional seating were added in 2000 and 2001, bringing the stadium capacity to 85,612 and 86,063 respectively. In 2004, an additional section was added to each end of the east upper deck as well as more luxury suites and additional general seating, giving the stadium a capacity of 87,451. Additional premium seats were added in 2023, expanding the stadium's capacity to its current 88,043.

In 1998, artist Michael Taylor was commissioned to paint ten large murals on the east-side exterior of the stadium. The paintings depicted the greatest players, teams, and moments from Auburn's football history to that date. Auburn updated the murals in 2006 and again in 2011 after the team's national championship in 2010.

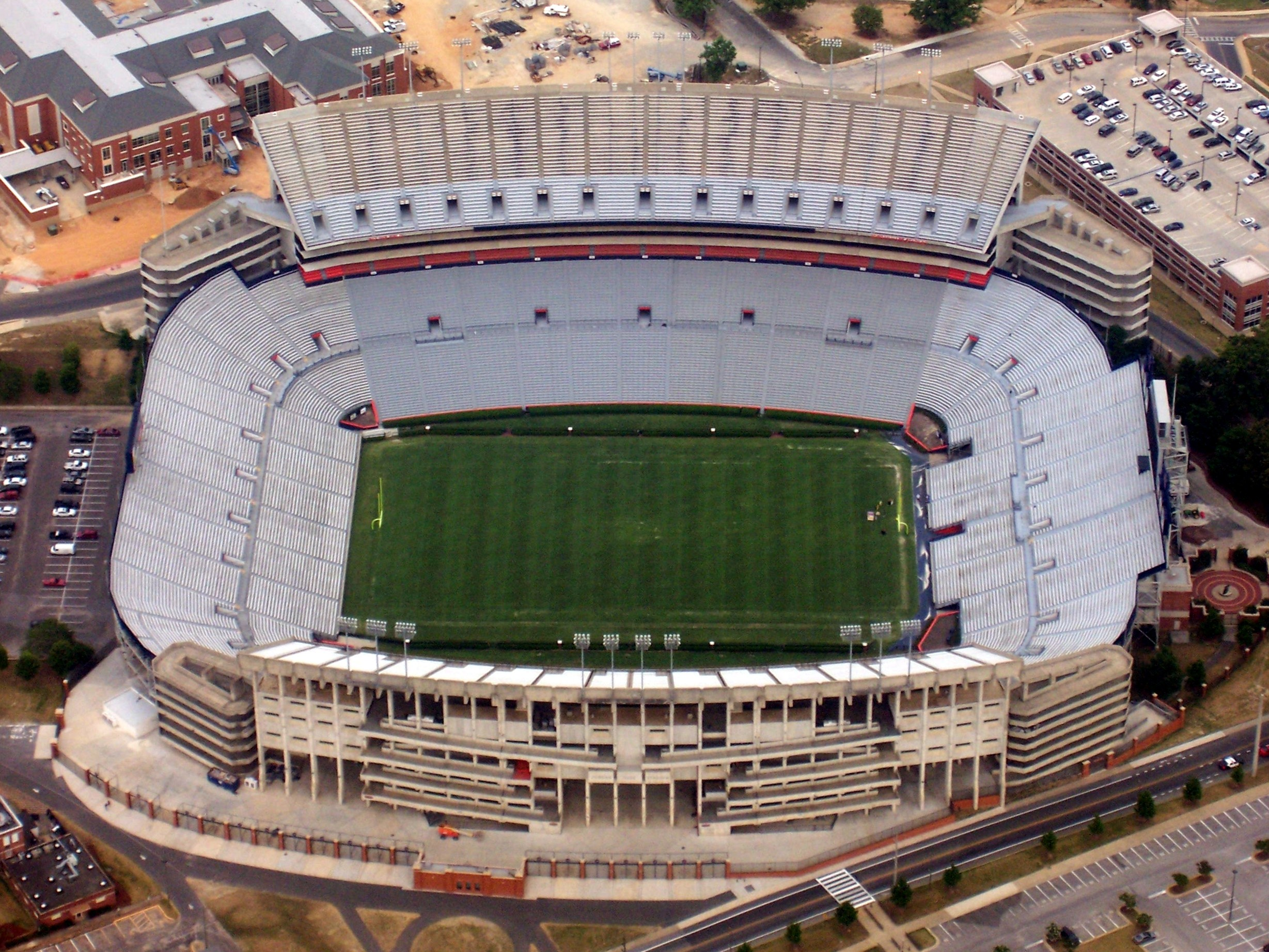
Jordan-Hare pictured from above in 2008.

Before the 2007 season, a $2.9 million, 30-foot (9.1 m) high by 74-foot (23 m) wide HD Daktronics LED video display was installed in the south end zone of Jordan–Hare Stadium. Auburn was the first Southeastern Conference school to install an HD video display and the second in the NCAA (after Texas' Godzillatron). In August 2015, a new LED video board that is 57 by 190 feet (17 by 58 m), or 10,830 square feet (1,006 m^{2}), was unveiled and is currently the second largest video board in college athletics (only the video board at the University of Oregon's Autzen Stadium is larger) and among the largest in the world (it would rank at #46 if the Autzen stadium board was on the list).

In 2015, Auburn considered a complete reconstruction of the north end-zone section, which would have included new premium club seating and lounges, as well as establishing a new home locker room to replace the existing facility in the south end zone. The cost of this project was estimated at $145 million. After surveying donors and the fan base at large, the university did not move forward with those plans, deciding instead to build a $28 million gameday support facility in the southwest corner of the stadium. The project includes renovation and expansion of the existing home locker room, relocation of the press box, a new player recruiting lounge, and a new premium fan club providing overviews of the end of Tiger Walk. In 2018, additional premium club seating and a lounge area was added to the existing 12,000-square-foot (1,100 m^{2}) press box in the west upper deck, and the coaches' boxes and television broadcast box in the same area underwent a renovation, all at a cost of $12 million.

The 2023 stadium upgrade not only added new premium seats but added new concession updates, a new team field entrance, and stadium WiFi improvements.

In 2024, construction started on a new videoboard behind the north endzone. It is about 2/3 the size of the existing videoboard and was completed in the summer of 2025, and shortly thereafter was used during the 2025 Football Season.

=== Capacity history ===
| Capacity | Years |
|---|---|
| 15,000 | 1939–1948 |
| 21,500 | 1949–1954 |
| 34,500 | 1955–1959 |
| 44,500 | 1960–1969 |
| 61,261 | 1970–1979 |
| 72,169 | 1980–1986 |
| 85,214 | 1987–1999 |
| 85,612 | 2000 |
| 86,063 | 2001–2003 |
| 87,451 | 2004–2022 |
| 88,043 | 2023–present |

== Other uses ==
Although Jordan-Hare Stadium is known primarily as a venue for football, it has hosted a handful of other events including an appearance by Billy Graham and concert appearances by James Brown, The Beach Boys, Miranda Lambert, Kenny Chesney, and Blake Shelton.

From 2010 to 2022, the stadium played host to the Alabama High School Athletic Association's football state championships, known as the "Super 7" since 2014 and formerly as the "Super 6" for the number of classifications in the state. However, in June 2024, the AHSAA announced its football championship games would no longer be played at Jordan-Hare or Bryant-Denny stadiums, citing the expanded format of the College Football Playoff that could potentially see either school host a first-round playoff game in December.

On June 9th, 2026, the stadium hosted its first soccer match, an international friendly between Argentina and Iceland ahead of the 2026 FIFA World Cup, which the United States co-hosted alongside Canada and Mexico. A War Eagle flight preceded the match, which Argentina won 3–0. The friendly set a record of 88,043 spectators, the highest attendance for a soccer match in the state of Alabama.

On October 10, 2026, Zach Bryan played the final stop of his “With Heaven on Tour” at the stadium. The concert was the day after Hurricane Isaias made landfall on the gulf coast of the state. It was uncertain leading up to the day of if the concert would go on.

== See also ==
- List of NCAA Division I FBS football stadiums

| Preceded by Drake Field | Home of the Auburn High School Tigers; 1939–1947 | Succeeded by Felton Little Park |
