= WGZZ =

- Waverly, Alabama; United States
- Broadcast area: Auburn-Opelika, Alabama
- Frequency: 94.3 MHz (HD Radio)
- Branding: Wings 94.3

Programming
- Format: Classic hits
- Subchannels: HD1: WGZZ analog HD2: News/Talk "NewsTalk WANI"; HD3: Sports "ESPN Auburn"; HD4: Soft AC "96.3 W-Lee"
- Affiliations: Compass Media Networks

Ownership
- Owner: Auburn Network, Inc.
- Sister stations: WANI

History
- First air date: 1989 (as WZLM at 97.3)
- Former call signs: WZLM (1989–2004); WKGA (2004–2007)
- Former frequencies: 97.3 MHz (1989–2004); 100.3 MHz (2004–2010)

Technical information
- Licensing authority: FCC
- Facility ID: 15283
- Class: A
- ERP: 4,200 watts
- HAAT: 120 meters (390 ft)
- Transmitter coordinates: 32°44′11″N 85°29′54″W
- Translators: 96.3 W242AX (Auburn, relays HD4); 98.7 W245AY (Auburn, relays HD2); 106.7 W294AR (Auburn, relays HD3)

Links
- Public license information: Public file; LMS
- Webcast: Listen live HD2: Listen live HD3: Listen live HD4: Listen live
- Website: wingsfm.com HD2: newstalkwani.com HD3: espnau.com HD4: 963wlee.com

WGZZ (94.3 FM, "Wings 94.3") is a radio station licensed to serve Waverly, Alabama, United States. The station is owned by Auburn Network, Inc. It airs a classic hits music format.

The station was assigned the WGZZ call letters by the Federal Communications Commission on July 18, 2007.

On April 19, 2010, WGZZ moved from 100.3 FM to 94.3 FM.

== Translators ==
Broadcast translator for WGZZ-HD2
| Call sign | Frequency | City of license | FID | ERP (W) | HAAT | Class | Transmitter coordinates | FCC info |
|---|---|---|---|---|---|---|---|---|
| W254AY | 98.7 FM | Auburn, Alabama | 138347 | 250 | 169 m (554 ft) | D | 32°40′3.5″N 85°33′0.8″W | LMS |

Broadcast translator for WGZZ-HD3
| Call sign | Frequency | City of license | FID | ERP (W) | HAAT | Class | Transmitter coordinates | FCC info |
|---|---|---|---|---|---|---|---|---|
| W294AR | 106.7 FM | Auburn, Alabama | 141199 | 250 | 169 m (554 ft) | D | 32°40′3.5″N 85°33′0.8″W | LMS |

Broadcast translator for WGZZ-HD4
| Call sign | Frequency | City of license | FID | ERP (W) | HAAT | Class | Transmitter coordinates | FCC info |
|---|---|---|---|---|---|---|---|---|
| W242AX | 96.3 FM | Auburn, Alabama | 146140 | 250 | 176 m (577 ft) | D | 32°40′3.5″N 85°33′0.8″W | LMS |

== Format and Programs ==
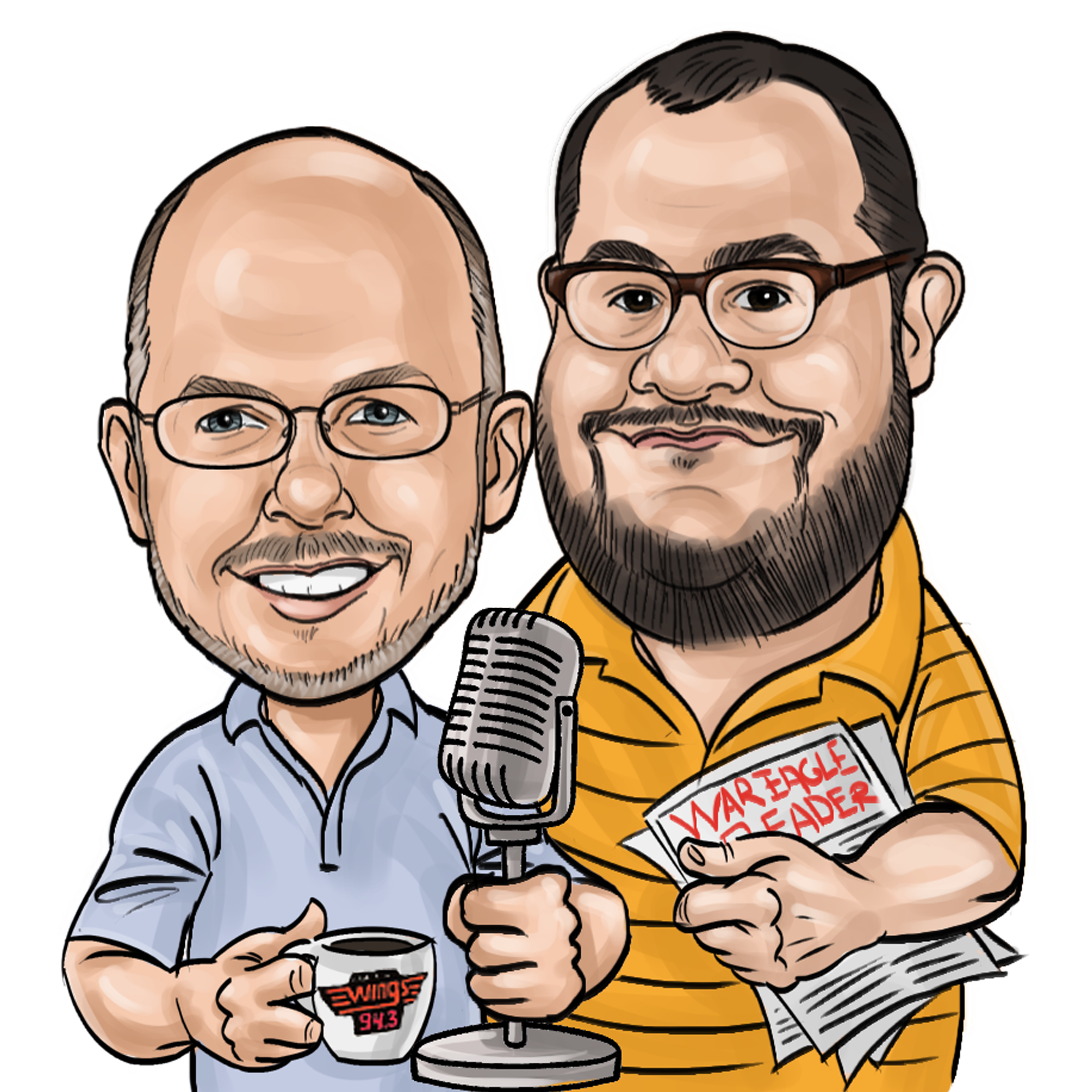
Caricature of Rich and Jeremy

WGZZ ("Wings 94.3") airs classic rock from the late 1960s to the early 1980s. Wings features a local morning radio show, "Rich and Jeremy in the Morning", which airs weekdays from 6:00 CST to 9:00 CST featuring Rich Perkins of Wings and Jeremy Henderson of The War Eagle Reader website. The show began in January 2016 and is primarily comedy. Rich and Jeremy include live guests and phone calls during the show. Clips of the show are available on Rich and Jeremy's SoundCloud page. After Rich and Jeremy, Al Mason hosts "Rewind at 9" on weekdays at 9:00 CST, a program that spotlights a specific classic year's music. John Garrett hosts "The 4 O'Clock Beatles Block" on weekdays at 4:00 CST featuring four classic Beatles songs. Weekdays at 5:00 CST, Wings airs a "Live at 5" feature for a couple of classic rock songs recorded from a live concert.

Wings 94.3 is also the official station of Auburn High School Football. Wings airs a coaches show on Mondays prior to a game with Bill Cameron and Auburn High head coach Adam Winegarden. On game day, Bill Cameron assumes play-by-play duties, he is joined on the broadcast by Chuck Furlow, Gabe Gross, and Scott Bagwell.

On July 18, 2023, it was announced WGZZ would become the official broadcast home of Auburn Tigers football and men's basketball, alongside the university's "Tiger Talk" talk radio program, as part of a deal with owner RadioAlabama (reacquiring rights to the team after previously holding them from 2013-2016).

== Sister Stations ==
WGZZ is a broadcast service of Auburn Network, Inc., which also owns three other radio stations, including Newstalk WANI (WANI-AM, W242AY), ESPN 106.7 (WGZZ-HD3, W294AR), and 96-3 W-LEE (WGZZ-HD2, W242AX)
