= Reuben Foster =

American football player (born 1994)

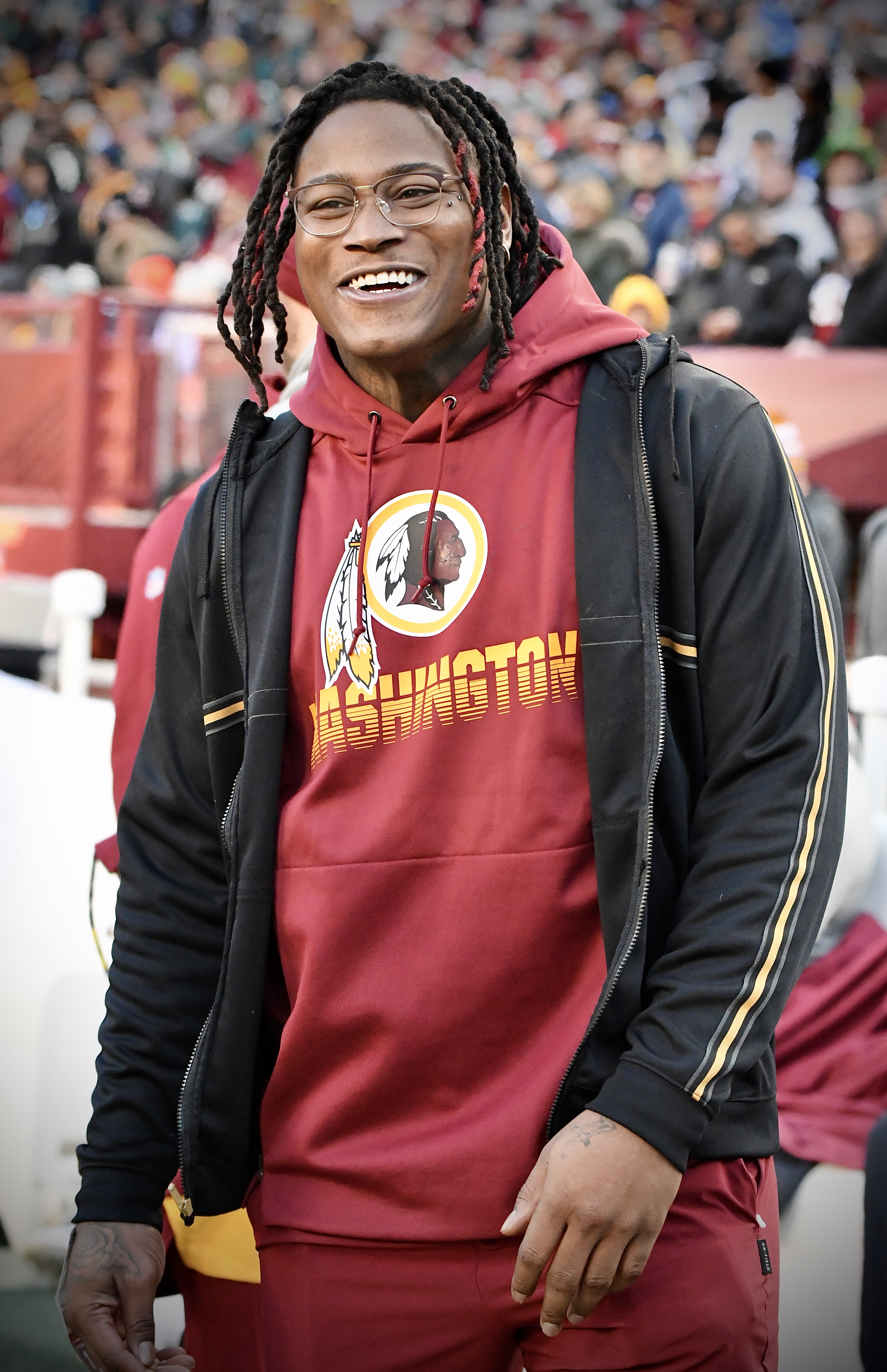
- Foster with the Washington Redskins in 2019

Profile
- Position: Linebacker

Personal information
- Born: April 4, 1994 (age 32); Roanoke, Alabama, U.S.
- Listed height: 6 ft 1 in (1.85 m)
- Listed weight: 228 lb (103 kg)

Career information
- High school: Auburn
- College: Alabama (2013–2016)
- NFL draft: 2017: 1st round, 31st overall pick

Career history
- San Francisco 49ers (2017–2018); Washington Redskins / Football Team (2018–2020); Pittsburgh Maulers (2023); Houston Roughnecks (2024); Arlington Renegades (2025)*
- * Offseason or practice squad member only

Awards and highlights
- PFWA All-Rookie Team (2017); CFP national champion (2015); Unanimous All-American (2016); Butkus Award (2016); First-team All-SEC (2016)

Career NFL statistics
- Total tackles: 101
- Pass deflections: 2
- Stats at Pro Football Reference

Reuben Foster (born April 4, 1994) is an American professional football linebacker. A consensus All-American in high school, Foster was regarded as the best linebacker prospect of his class before committing to Alabama, where he played from 2013 to 2016. In his final season there he was awarded the Butkus Award, which is given to the nation's best linebacker.

He was selected by the San Francisco 49ers in the first round of the 2017 NFL draft. During his professional career, Foster has been involved with a number of legal issues and other controversies, including multiple arrests, which led to his release from the 49ers in just his second season. He was claimed off waivers by the Washington Redskins shortly after, a move that was met with criticism.

== Early life ==
A native of Roanoke, Alabama, Foster moved across the border to LaGrange, Georgia, after sixth grade. He attended Troup County High School, where he played high school football and was teammates with Quan Bray and J. C. Copeland. During his freshman year in a game against Columbus (GA) Carver, Foster had a heralded performance against blue chip running back Isaiah Crowell. "That was my coming out party. That's when they started calling me 'freakish freshman'", said Foster. He completed his freshman season with 110 tackles, and added 112 as a sophomore.

Foster finished his junior season at Troup County High School with 185 tackles, including 34 tackles for loss and 18 sacks. In February 2012, Troup County head coach Charles Flowers was dismissed, allegedly due to a rumor that he paid a football player to move from Lanett, Alabama, to West Point, Georgia, in order to play for Troup. Immediately afterwards, Foster announced his intention to transfer to another high school for his senior season.

Foster eventually moved back to Alabama and enrolled at Auburn High School in April 2012, where he became teammates with Rashaan Evans. Along with the transfer came a switch in commitment from Alabama to Auburn, which triggered an NCAA investigation.

In his senior year at Auburn High, Foster recorded 80 tackles (70 solo) and two sacks, helping the Tigers advance to the quarterfinals of the Class 6A playoffs. Auburn High School lost 7–8 in a grueling, defensive battle to rival Opelika High School at Duck Samford Stadium. Foster participated in the 2013 Under Armour All-America Game, finishing with six tackles and 2.5 for loss, earning Defensive MVP honors.

=== Recruiting ===
Everything you've heard about Reuben Foster, it's all true – he's big, fast, strong, explosive and finishes off his tackles as good as any player I've ever seen in this business. He's the complete package at linebacker.

— Rusty Mansell, National Recruiting Analyst for 247Sports.com.

Regarded as a four-star recruit by ESPN, Foster was listed as the top inside linebacker of his class. Chris Yeager, who coached the Alabama All-Stars in the 2012 Alabama-Mississippi Classic, compared Foster to Cornelius Bennett.

Since his sophomore year, Foster was recruited by a number of Southeastern Conference schools. In July 2011, Foster verbally committed to Alabama, citing the NFL pedigree of head coach Nick Saban and defensive coordinator Kirby Smart as the decisive factor. However, Foster was not firm on his commitment, so other schools continued to recruit him. After transferring to Auburn High School prior to his senior year, Foster decided to de-commit from Alabama, and switched to Auburn University. "At the end of the day, I feel like Auburn University is the place for me and my family. I am 100 percent confident with my final decision", said Foster. He went so far to have the Auburn University emblem tattooed on his right arm.

Foster's commitment to the Tigers, however, only lasted until December 2012, when Auburn dismissed head coach Gene Chizik, and assistant coach Trooper Taylor, to whom Foster had developed a personal relationship. Foster went through January looking at different schools, including Alabama, Auburn, South Carolina, Georgia, Washington, Miami (FL), and LSU, with Georgia believed to be the favorite. On National Signing Day however, Foster re-committed to Alabama.

== College career ==
Foster debuted as a true freshman for Alabama in the season-opener against Virginia Tech, registering one assisted tackle. He appeared in a total of nine games over the season, registering 12 tackles (four solo), including one tackle for a loss of yardage. Competing to fill the vacancy at inside linebacker left by Butkus Award winner C. J. Mosley, Foster was injured during spring practice on April 5, 2014.

The starting linebacker job eventually went to Reggie Ragland, but Foster still played in 11 games and had the third-most special teams tackles on the team with eight. He made his first career start at the middle linebacker position against West Virginia, compiling seven total tackles with two solo stops and a tackle for loss (−2 yards). Foster finished his sophomore season with 22 tackles including 11 solo stops, two tackles for loss (−5 yards) and one sack (−3 yards, against Texas A&M).

In his junior year, Foster took over as starting inside linebacker from Trey DePriest, and finished second on the team with 73 total tackles, eight for a loss (−24 yards), on the season. He also registered two sacks (−7 yards), three quarterback hurries, and nine pass breakups. Returning for his senior season, he was widely regarded as one of the best linebackers in college football. Sports Illustrated, USA Today, The Sporting News, and numerous other outlets named him a midseason All-American. After the season, he was awarded the Butkus Award, given to the nation's best linebacker. As a senior in 2016, Foster finished with 115 tackles, 13 for losses, and five sacks.

== Professional career ==
=== Pre-draft ===
On January 18, 2017, it was reported that Foster and Alabama teammate Jonathan Allen declined their invitations to play in the 2017 Senior Bowl. On February 13, 2017, it was revealed that Foster underwent surgery on his right shoulder to repair a torn rotator cuff. Foster was one of 19 collegiate linebackers to attend the NFL Scouting Combine in Indianapolis, Indiana, but was sent home after getting into a heated argument with a student hospital worker while receiving his medical examination at the combine. Foster objected to the way he was being treated and was sent home before being able to meet with team representatives from any NFL teams. During the combine, it was announced that Foster had failed a drug test. On March 8, 2017, Foster attended Alabama's pro day and set scheduled private meetings with NFL teams to discuss the incident that took place at the combine. On April 20, 2017, it was revealed that Foster's urine sample was reported as dilute, which is treated like a positive test. At the conclusion of the pre-draft process, Foster was projected to be a first round pick by NFL draft experts and scouts. He was ranked as the top inside linebacker prospect in the draft by NFLDraftScout.com, was ranked the top linebacker by NFL analysts Mike Mayock and Gil Brandt, and was ranked the second best linebacker (behind Temple's Haason Reddick) by ESPN.

Pre-draft measurables
Height	Weight	Arm length	Hand span	Wonderlic
6 ft 0 in (1.83 m)	229 lb (104 kg)	32 3/8 in (0.82 m)	10 1/4 in (0.26 m)	9
All values from NFL Combine

=== San Francisco 49ers ===
==== 2017 ====
The San Francisco 49ers selected Foster in the first round (31st overall) of the 2017 NFL draft. He was the third inside linebacker, behind Haason Reddick and Jarrad Davis, and the fifth linebacker selected in 2017. Foster was also the first of two linebackers drafted by the 49ers in 2017, along with Pita Taumoepenu. On June 9, 2017, the 49ers signed Foster to a four-year, $9.03 million contract with $6.87 million guaranteed and a signing bonus of $4.71 million.

He joined a revamped linebacker corp that consisted of NaVorro Bowman, Ahmad Brooks, Elvis Dumervil, and Malcolm Smith. Foster was slated to backup newly acquired free agent Malcolm Smith, but was named the starting right outside linebacker after Smith suffered a torn pectoral during training camp.

He made his professional regular season debut and first career start in the San Francisco 49ers' season-opener against the Carolina Panthers and recorded three solo tackles and deflected a pass during their 23-3 loss. He left the game after suffering an apparent ankle injury. He suffered the injury in the first quarter while pursuing Christian McCaffrey and was inactive for the next five games (Weeks 2-6). Foster's first career tackle came on the first drive after he tackled McCaffrey on a seven-yard reception. He returned in Week 7 and was named the starting middle linebacker after the 49ers released the veteran NaVorro Bowman. Foster finished the 49ers' 40-10 loss to the Dallas Cowboys with five combined tackles, but left in the third quarter after suffering a rib injury. On November 5, 2017, Foster recorded a season-high 14 combined tackles in the 20–10 loss to the Arizona Cardinals. He finished his rookie season with 72 combined tackles (59 solo) and a pass deflection in ten games and ten starts. He was named to the PFWA All-Rookie Team.

==== 2018 ====
On July 3, 2018, Foster was suspended two games for violating the league's personal conduct policy, stemming from a weapons offense and a misdemeanor drug offense. Following another arrest for domestic violence on November 24, 2018, Foster was released by the 49ers. 49ers head coach Kyle Shanahan stated that the decision was made as the arrest and all other previous issues made him "very hard to trust".

=== Washington Redskins / Football Team ===
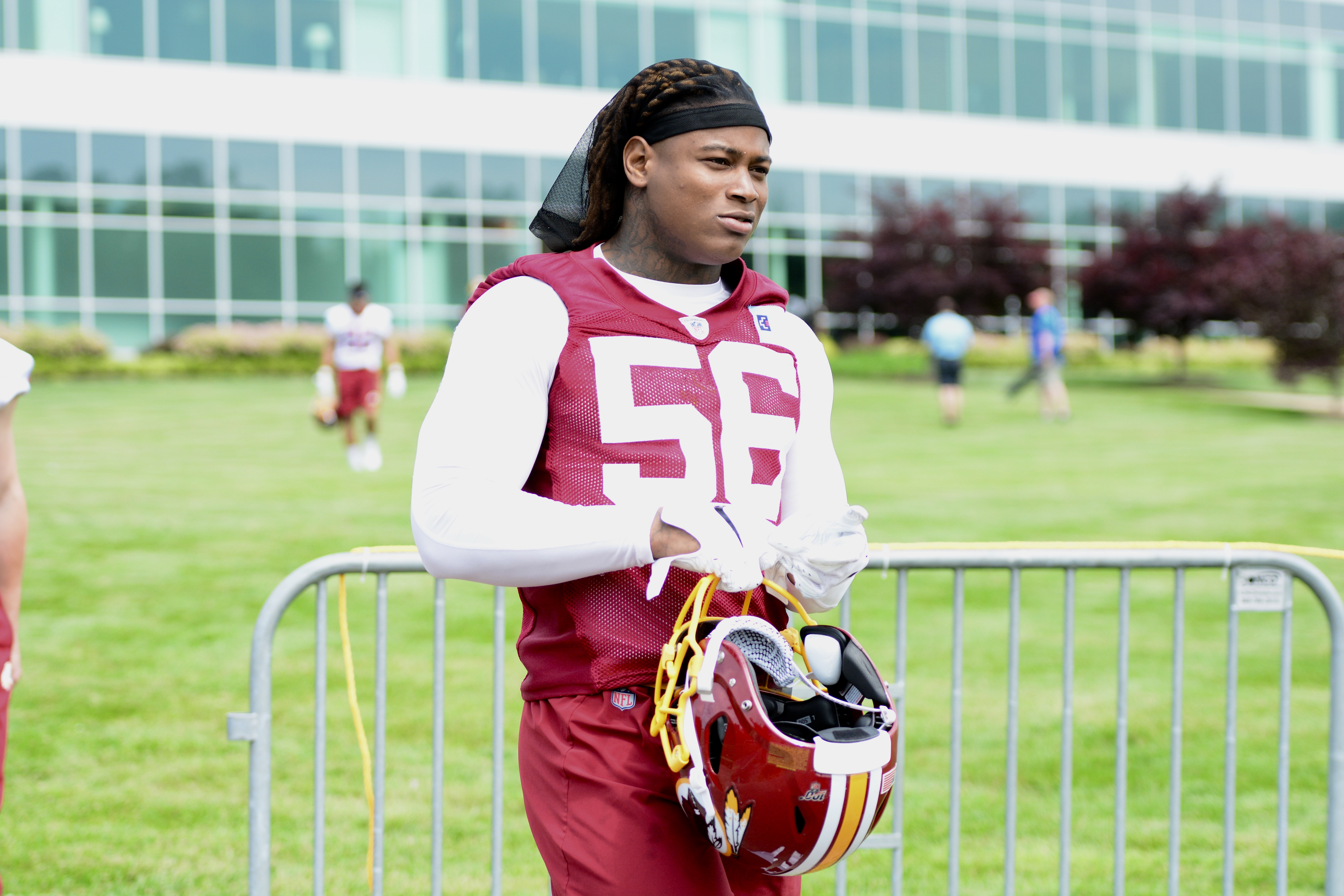
Foster in 2019

Foster was claimed off of waivers by the Washington Redskins on November 27, 2018. Regarding the decision to claim him, Redskins senior vice president of player personnel, Doug Williams, stated that he and the rest of the team were fully aware of the allegations that led to his arrest, adding that Foster would have to go through the legal process and accept any other punishment, from the league or elsewhere, before he could ever play in a game for them. He added that the Redskins decided to take a chance on him after consulting with a number of his ex-Alabama teammates on the team, and hoped that being around them would provide him with the "best possible" environment to succeed on and off the field. He was then placed on the commissioner's exempt list by the league. Head coach Jay Gruden further added that it was not guaranteed he would ever play for the team, saying that Foster had "a lot of work to do" before they would accept him playing for them. In April 2019, an internal NFL investigation found no evidence to support his suspension, with his reinstatement to the team's active roster. Instead, he was fined two game checks and put into an accountability plan developed in conjunction with the NFLPA and the Redskins, which included counseling, a living arrangement, weekly meetings, and community service to help him avoid future incidents.

During his first practice with the team in May 2019, Foster fell and suffered a torn ACL and LCL and was subsequently placed on injured reserve. Still recovering from the injury, he was placed on the physically unable to perform list on July 27, 2020, and activated on August 9, 2020, before being placed on injured reserve again on September 5, 2020. His contract with the team expired after the 2020 season.

On April 8, 2022, the Miami Dolphins hosted Foster on a workout. On July 31, Foster had another workout with the Seattle Seahawks, but no deal was reached.

=== Pittsburgh Maulers ===
On January 27, 2023, Foster was signed by the Pittsburgh Maulers of the United States Football League (USFL). In his first professional football action since 2018, Foster started all eight games for the Maulers, recording 53 tackles, three tackles for loss, one half-sack, one forced fumble, five pass deflections, and one interception. The Maulers folded when the XFL and USFL merged to create the United Football League (UFL).

=== Houston Roughnecks ===
On January 5, 2024, Foster was selected by the Houston Roughnecks during the 2024 UFL dispersal draft. In eight games played, Foster recorded 30 tackles, three tackles for loss, one half-sack, one forced fumble, one fumble recovery, three pass deflections, and one interception. He was placed on Injured reserve on May 24, 2024. Foster was waived by the Roughnecks on August 19.

=== Arlington Renegades ===
On August 20, 2024, Foster was claimed off waivers by the Arlington Renegades.

== Personal life ==
Foster was born to Inita Berry Paige and Danny Foster on April 4, 1994. His parents were estranged in November 1995 when Foster shot Paige in the back. She was holding her 18-month-old son, Reuben Foster. Danny Foster was indicted by a grand jury in 1996 but fled the state before being arrested in California. He was extradited to Randolph County but escaped from jail in December 1996. He took on a new identity in Miami but was arrested after spending 16 years on the run and was extradited to Randolph County, Alabama. Foster has a daughter, A'Zyia, who was born in 2009.

=== Legal issues ===
On January 13, 2018, Foster was arrested in Alabama by the Tuscaloosa County Sheriff's Office for possession of marijuana. On February 11, 2018, Foster was arrested on suspicion of domestic violence, threats, and assault weapon possession charges. On April 12, he was charged with felony counts of multiple domestic violence, possession of a weapon, and infliction of bodily harm. On April 25, Foster's girlfriend through her lawyer made a statement saying "(Foster) did not strike her, injure her or threaten her," and that the domestic violence claims were made after Foster attempted to end the relationship after she told him her injuries resulted from a fight with another woman. On May 17, Elissa Ennis testified under oath that she had fabricated the story "as a money scheme".

On November 24, 2018, Foster was arrested again on probable cause misdemeanor domestic violence charges, and was released by the 49ers the following day. Shortly after his release, he was claimed off waivers by the Washington Redskins, a move that was criticized by many. In January 2019, the State Attorney's Office in Florida dropped the charges, claiming that there was insufficient evidence against him after reviewing the case.
