= Ross Field (athletic) =

Former athletic field in Auburn, Alabama

- Interactive map of Ross Field
- Location: Auburn, Alabama, United States
- Coordinates: 32°36′49″N 85°28′42″W
- Owner: Auburn High School, City of Auburn
- Operator: Auburn High School, City of Auburn
- Surface: Grass

Construction
- Opened: September 22, 1921
- Closed: 1998

Tenant
- Auburn High School Tigers (AHSAA) (1921-1935)

Ross Field was an American football and baseball field located in Auburn, Alabama, United States from 1921 until 1998. It was the home field of the Auburn High School Tigers football team from 1921 until 1935. Ross Field was named for Bennett Battle Ross, Jr., an Auburn High School alumnus who was Dean of Chemistry and acting president of the Alabama Polytechnic Institute (today Auburn University) who had worked to bring county flagship status to Auburn High in 1914. Ross Field was the first on-campus stadium for Auburn High School; previous football teams had shared Drake Field with the Auburn University football team. From 1929 onward, the field was sometimes known as Mitchell Field.

By the mid-1930s, Ross Field had grown too small to accommodate football crowds, and Auburn High games were moved back to Drake Field. When the former high school campus was transferred to the city of Auburn as a community center in the 1950s, the field was used as a community football and baseball field, and the football field was reconstructed as a softball field in 1964. The Jan Dempsey Community Arts Center was built on the site of Ross Field in 1998.

Preceded by Drake Field	Home of the Auburn High School Tigers; 1921 — 1935	Succeeded by Drake Field
