= Felton Little Park =

Municipal park in Auburn, Alabama

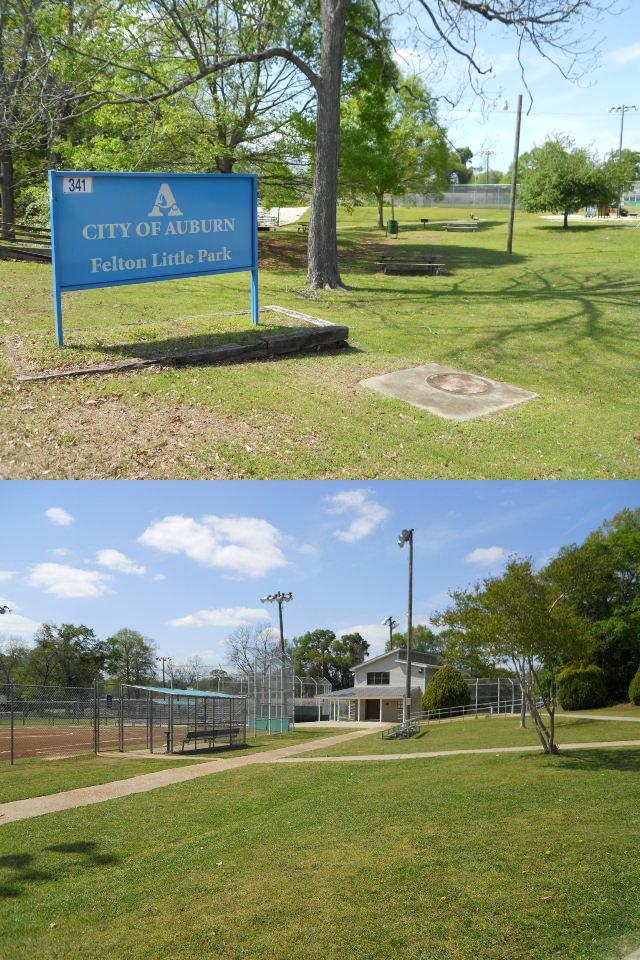
- Interactive map of Felton Little Park
- Former names: Auburn City Park (1949–1955)
- Location: 341 East Glenn Avenue; Auburn, Alabama, United States
- Coordinates: 32°36′38″N 85°28′37″W
- Owner: City of Auburn
- Operator: City of Auburn
- Surface: Grass

Construction
- Groundbreaking: 1949
- Opened: September 30, 1949
- Renovated: 2003
- Closed: October 4, 1968

Tenant
- Auburn High School Tigers (AHSAA) (1949–1968)

Felton Little Park (originally Auburn City Park) is a municipal park in Auburn, Alabama, United States. Felton Little Park is the oldest park in Auburn. From 1949 until 1968, the park was the home stadium of the Auburn High School Tigers football team, and from 1949 through 1967, the Auburn High School baseball team. Today, Felton Little Park has three softball fields for youth leagues. The park is named for Felton Little, an Auburn city councilman who donated the land for the park.

== History ==
In the late 1940s the city of Auburn decided that the town needed a centrally located park and football and baseball facilities for Auburn High School, which had previously been playing home matches at nearby Auburn University. The nearest property suitable for such a park to downtown was owned by Felton Little, who donated the land to the city in September 1947. On September 30, 1949, the park was dedicated as Auburn City Park as the Auburn High football team played Tuskegee High School. As the football field was equipped with outdoor lights, this was the first night football game to be played in Auburn.

In 1955, the park was renamed "Felton Little Park" after its benefactor. In 1967, the Auburn High baseball team moved from the park to a new facility on the high school campus (today Sam Welborn Field), and on October 4, 1968, the football team played its final game at Felton Little before inaugurating its new stadium, Duck Samford Stadium. In the early 1970s, the park was converted to house three youth-league baseball fields, and in 2003 the park underwent a major renovation which converted the three fields to softball fields.

== Records ==
Auburn High School's football team played 20 seasons at Felton Little, compiling a 42–42–8 record.

A local Auburn resident maintains a Facebook page dedicated to records, photos, and memories.

== See also ==
- Felton Little Park – official site

Preceded by Auburn Stadium	Home of the Auburn High School Tigers; 1949 — 1968	Succeeded by Duck Samford Stadium
