= Duck Samford Stadium =

Stadium in Auburn, Alabama

- "The Duck"
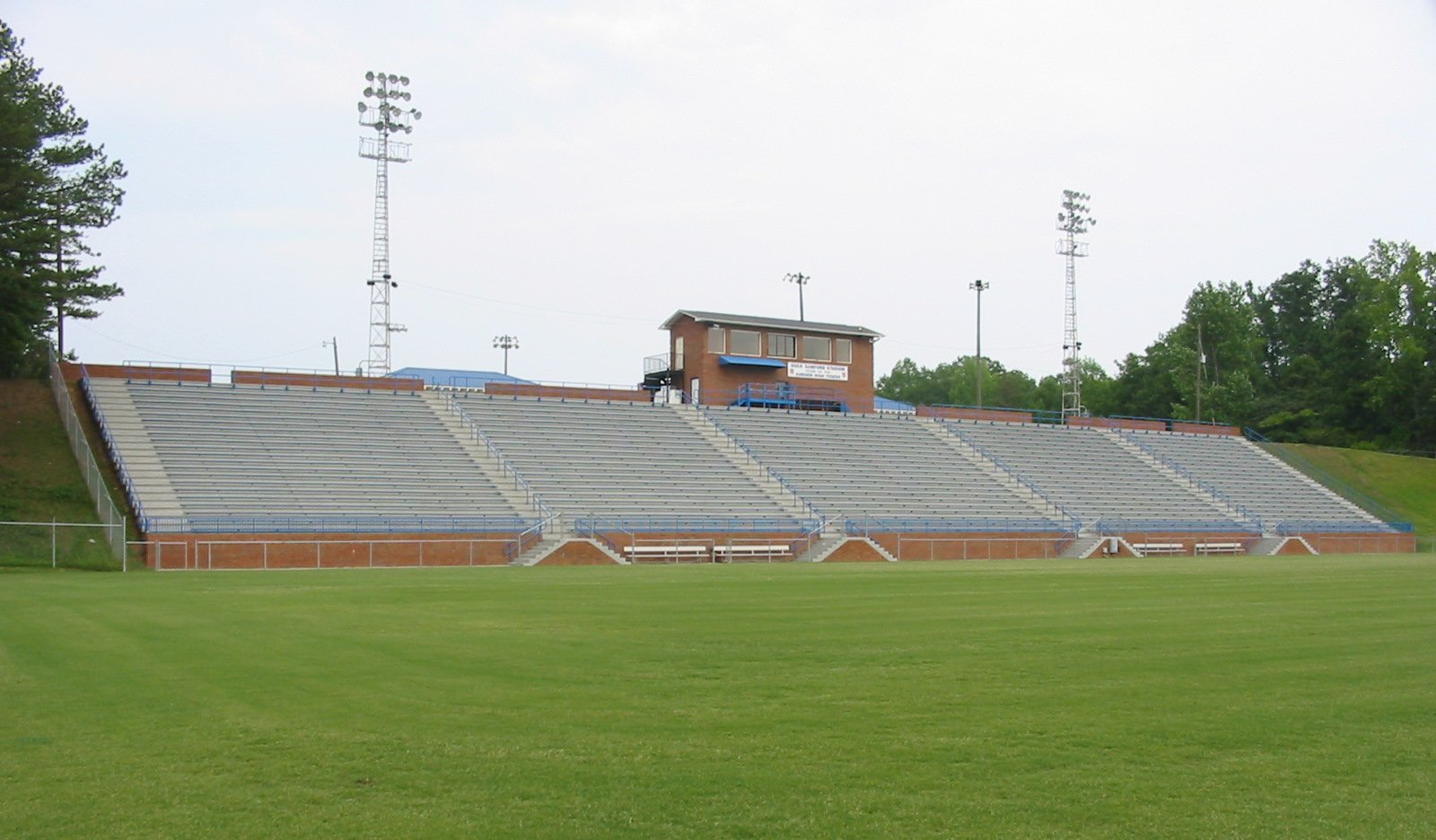
- Interactive map of Duck Samford Stadium
- Location: 1600 East University Drive; Auburn, Alabama, USA
- Coordinates: 32°36′37″N 85°26′49″W
- Owner: Auburn City Schools
- Operator: Auburn City Schools
- Capacity: 8,310
- Surface: Synthetic turf
- Record attendance: 10,000+ (November 27, 2009)

Construction
- Groundbreaking: 1968
- Opened: October 25, 1968
- Cost: $1.1 million

Tenants
- Auburn High School Tigers (AHSAA) (1968-Present); J. F. Drake High School Wildcats (AHSAA) (1968-1969)

Duck Samford Stadium is a stadium in Auburn, Alabama. It is primarily used for American football and soccer, and is the home field of the Auburn High School Tigers. Duck Samford Stadium was constructed in 1968, and seats 8,310 spectators. The field is named after James Drake "Duck" Samford, a former Auburn University football player and longtime supporter of youth athletics in Auburn who donated the land for the facility.

== History ==
Plans for constructing a stadium to replace Felton Little Park—which had served as Auburn High School's home field since 1949—on the site now occupied by Duck Samford Stadium began in 1964. On March 23, 1965, James "Duck" Samford donated the 40.2-acre (163,000 m^{2}) site to the City of Auburn. In May 1967, the Auburn City Schools agreed to a ten-year lease of the proposed stadium, which the city of Auburn constructed the following year for $1.1 million. The stadium opened on October 25, 1968, with an Auburn High School loss to Lanett High School, 14-13; the first home win at the venue came three weeks later against arch-rival Opelika High School, 41-0. The original seating consisted of what is today the home (east) stands, and seated 3,986.

In 1974, a fieldhouse was constructed behind the north endzone. The stadium was expanded in 1984 to include a visitors' seating section on the west side of the stadium, which increased capacity to 6,000. A further expansion in 1993 increased the west side stands to increase the stadium's capacity to 7,120. The stadium underwent a $2.0 million renovation in 2004, with the east side stands completely replaced. At the same time, the existing turf was replaced with TifSport Certified Bermuda grass, the same playing surface as at the University of Texas's Darrell K Royal–Texas Memorial Stadium and the Washington Redskins' FedExField.

In 2005, ownership of Duck Samford was transferred from the City of Auburn to the Auburn City School District. The 35-year-old original fieldhouse was torn down and replaced by the Travis L. Rabren Fieldhouse in 2009. In 2010, a $705,000 expansion resulted in the construction of new restrooms, replacement of the scoreboard, and additional seating to bring the stadium's capacity to 8,310. During the summer of 2016, the stadium’s grass surface was replaced with artificial turf, part of a $629,000 project funded by Auburn City Schools to enhance the usability of the field.

== Miscellaneous ==
Duck Samford Stadium is part of the Duck Samford Sports Complex, which also includes ten baseball fields, a walking trail, and two multi-use fields. The complex hosted the 2005 Dixie Youth World Series.

Through 2011, the Auburn High School football team has a 153-95-1 record at Duck Samford Stadium, a winning percentage of 0.616. The stadium has hosted sixteen Alabama High School Athletic Association football playoff games; in those matches, Auburn High School has an 8-8 record.

Duck Samford Stadium is the site of the City of Auburn's Fourth of July fireworks display.

| Preceded by Felton Little Park | Home of the Auburn High School Tigers; 1968 — present | Succeeded by Current |
