= List of Auburn High School people =

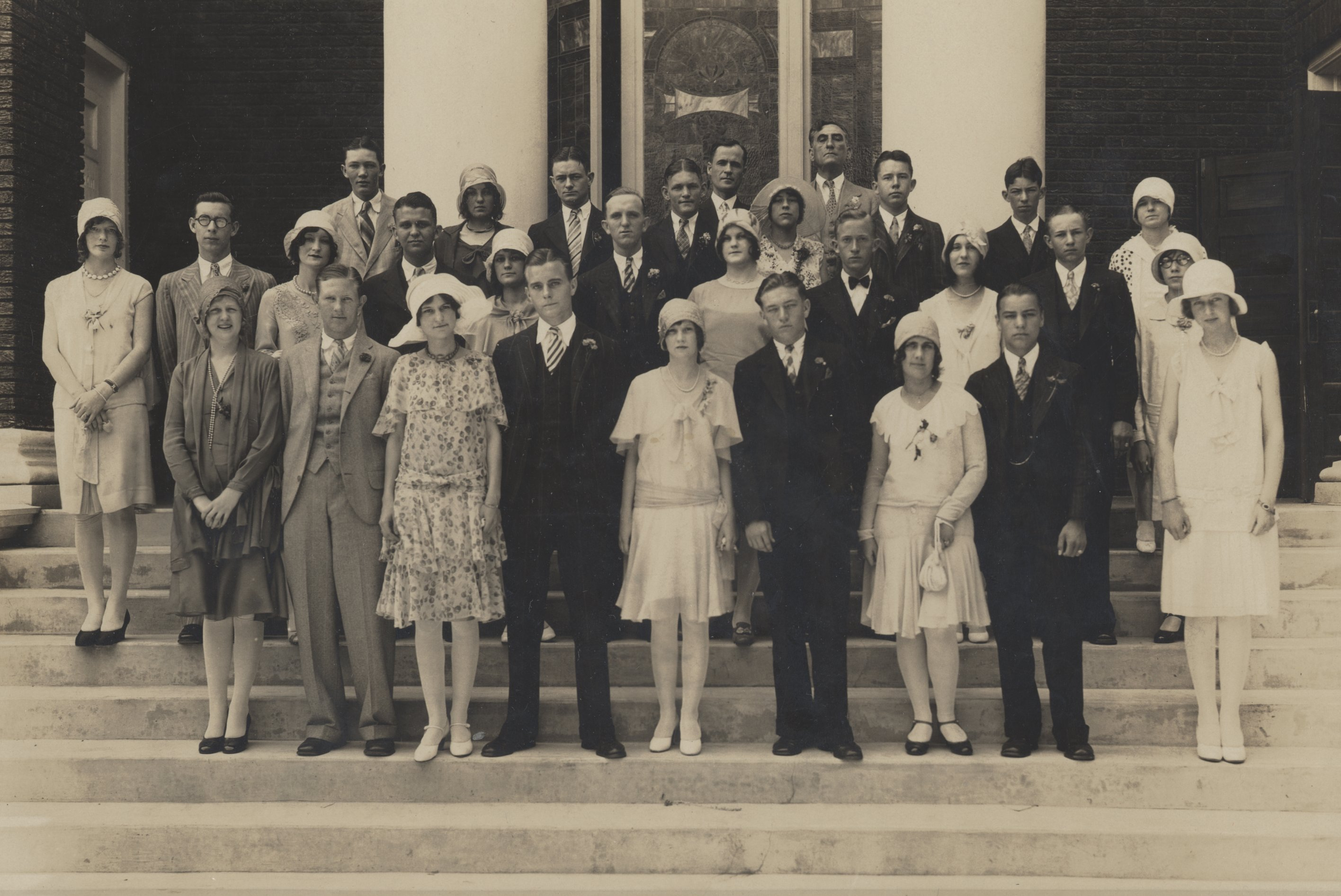
The Auburn High School class of 1929, after baccalaureate exercises

This list of Auburn High School people includes graduates, former students, administrators, trustees, faculty, and staff of Auburn High School in Auburn, Alabama, United States. The list includes people affiliated with the school's predecessor institutions, the Auburn Female College (1843–1852, 1870–1885), the Auburn Masonic Female College (1852–1870), the Auburn Female Institute (1892–1908), and Lee County High School (1914–1956).

Auburn High School is the oldest public high school in Alabama, and the third-oldest operating secondary school in the United States south of Philadelphia. As of 2010, the school enrolled 1,309 students in technical, academic, and International Baccalaureate programs as well as joint enrollment with Auburn University and Southern Union State Community College.

The first graduation exercises of Auburn High School were held in the 1840s, awarding fewer than a dozen diplomas at each session. Today the school awards over three hundred diplomas a year, and has graduated more than ten thousand students. This list organizes those associated with Auburn High School into rough professional areas and lists them in order of graduating class or years of affiliation with the school.

== Professional area ==
=== Art, literature, and music ===
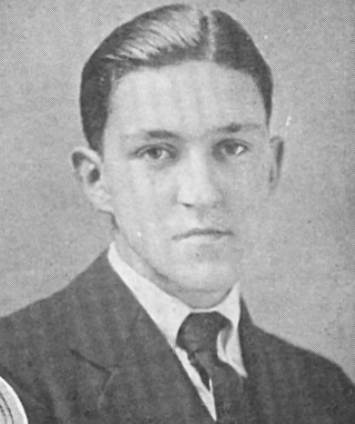
William Spratling (1917), silversmith

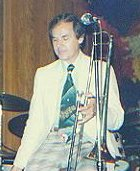
Urbie Green (att. 1943), jazz trombonist

| Name | Class year or years affiliated | Notability | Reference |
|---|---|---|---|
| William Spratling | 1917 | Silversmith and artist; considered the "father of Mexican silver"; co-authored Sherwood Anderson and Other Famous Creoles with William Faulkner | |
| Urbie Green | 1943 (attended) | Jazz trombonist | |
| Rosemary Glyde | 1966 | Violist and composer; founder of the New York Viola Society | |
| Allen Hinds | 1974 | Guitarist and jazz musician | |
| Ted Vives | 1982 | Composer, trombonist, and director of the Los Alamos Community Winds | |
| Brian Teasley | 1980s | Musician, Man or Astro-man?, Servotron, The Polyphonic Spree | |
| Man or Astro-man? | 1980s | Surf punk band | |
| Kate Higgins | 1987 | Voice actress, singer; English voice of Sakura Haruno in Naruto | |
| Ace Atkins | 1989 | Author, Pulitzer Prize-nominated journalist | |
| James Fukai | 1992 | Guitarist, Trust Company | |
| Youssef Biaz | 2011 | Spoken word artist | |

=== Journalism ===
Robert D. Knapp (1916), aviator

| Name | Class year or years affiliated | Notability | Reference |
|---|---|---|---|
| Tom Sellers | 1941 | Journalist, Columbus Ledger; won 1955 Pulitzer Prize for Public Service | |
| Mary Lou Foy | 1962 | Photojournalist, picture editor of Washington Post; president of the National Press Photographers Association, 1992 | |
| Vanessa Echols | 1979 | News anchor, WRDQ and WFTV, Orlando, Florida | |

=== Military ===
| Name | Class year or years affiliated | Notability | Reference |
|---|---|---|---|
| Robert D. Knapp | 1916 | Aviation pioneer; US Air Force brigadier general | |
| John E. Pitts, Jr. | 1942 | US Army brigadier general; director International Staff, Inter-American Defense Board | |

=== Politics and government ===
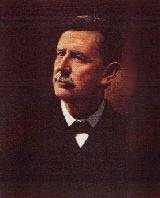
William J. Samford (1864), 32nd Governor of Alabama

| Name | Class year or years affiliated | Notability | Reference |
|---|---|---|---|
| John William Jones | 1852–1856, trustee | Congressman and physician; member of the United States House of Representatives, 1847–1849 | |
| David Clopton | 1859–1870, trustee | Politician and jurist; member of the United States House of Representatives, 1859–1861; member of the Confederate Congress, 1861–1865; associate justice, Supreme Court of Alabama, 1884–1892 | |
| James F. Dowdell | 1859–1870, trustee | Congressman and professor; member of the United States House of Representatives, 1853–1859; second president of Auburn University | |
| James R. Dowdell | 1863–1864 | Chief justice, Supreme Court of Alabama, 1909–1914 | |
| George Paul Harrison, Jr. | 1869–1870, trustee | Politician and lawyer; Confederate States Army colonel; member of the United States House of Representatives, 1894–1897 | |
| William J. Samford | 1864 | Governor of Alabama, 1900–1901 | |
| William H. Lamar | 1870s | Assistant attorney general of the United States, solicitor of the Post Office; censor of the US Mail under the Espionage Act of 1917 and Sedition Act of 1918 | |
| David Vann | 1944 | Mayor of Birmingham, Alabama, 1975–1979 | |
| George McMillan | 1962 | Lieutenant governor of Alabama, 1979–1983 | |
| Joe Turnham | 1977 | Chairman, Alabama Democratic Party | |
| Ed Packard | 1986 | Politician; 2006 Democratic candidate for Alabama Secretary of State | |
| Robert Gibbs | 1989 | 28th White House Press Secretary | |

=== Science, mathematics and technology ===
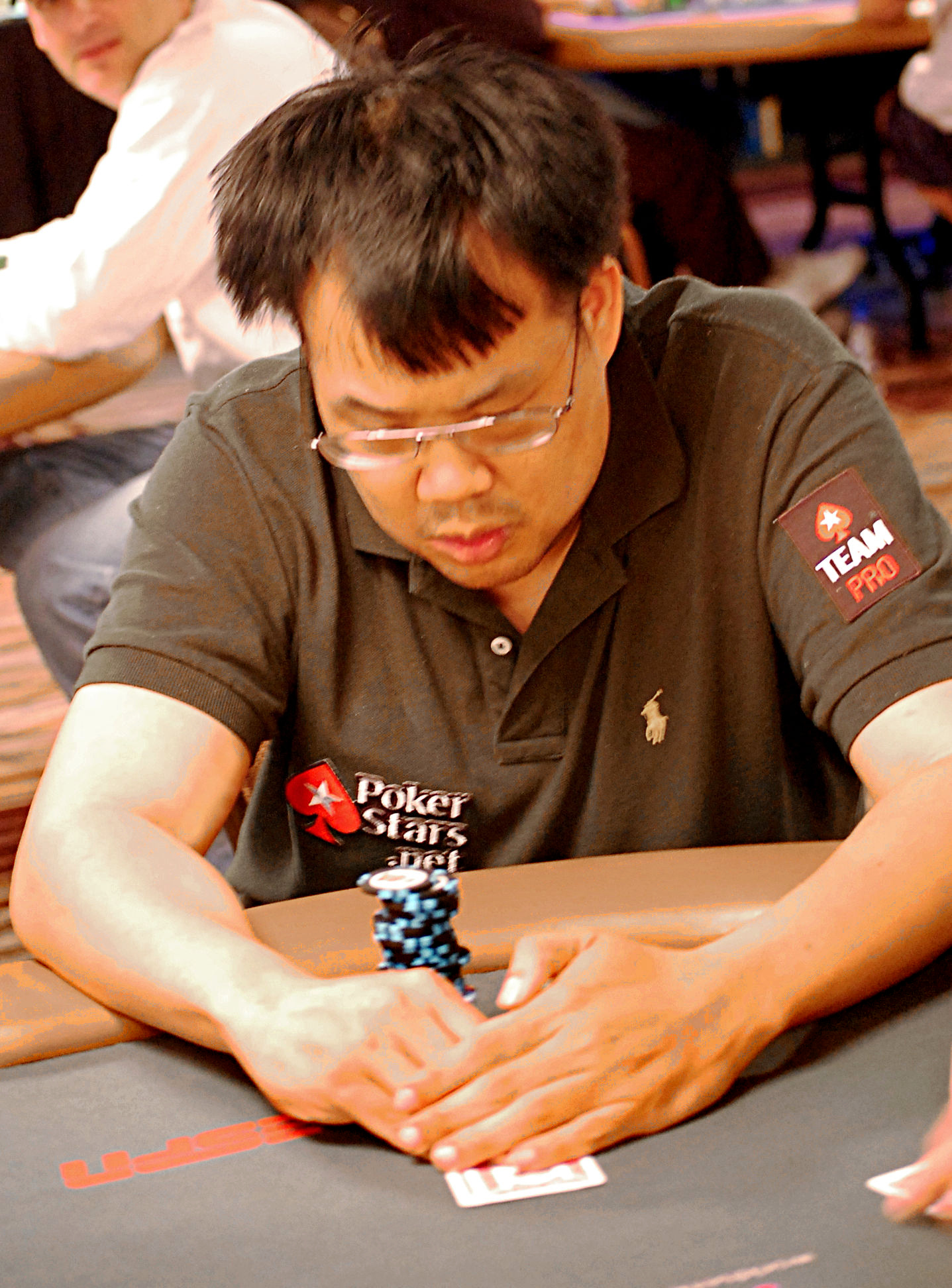
William Chen (1988), mathematician; professional poker player

| Name | Class year or years affiliated | Notability | Reference |
|---|---|---|---|
| John M. Darby | 1855–1858, President; 1855–1862, Professor of Natural Science | Botanist; created the first comprehensive catalogue of flora for the Southern United States | |
| I. T. Quinn | 1914–1915, Principal | Conservationist, game commissioner of Alabama and Virginia; a founder and first vice president of the National Wildlife Federation | |
| Greg Kuperberg | 1981–1982 | Mathematician, University of California, Davis; author of video games Paratrooper, J-Bird, and PC-Man; Alfred P. Sloan Research Fellow, 1998–2000 | |
| William Chen | 1988 | Mathematician, quantitative analyst, Susquehanna International Group; winner in two 2006 World Series of Poker events | |
| Eric Harshbarger | 1989 | Mathematician and LEGO artist | |
| Mark Spencer | 1995 | Computer engineer; chairman and CTO, Digium; creator of Asterisk PBX and original programmer of Pidgin instant messaging software | |

=== Social sciences ===
William P. Harrison (1861–1862), chaplain of the United States House of Representatives

| Name | Class year or years affiliated | Notability | Reference |
|---|---|---|---|
| William J. Sasnett | 1859–1861, trustee | Professor and minister; first president of Auburn University | |
| Holland McTyeire | 1860–1870, trustee | Minister; bishop in the Methodist Episcopal Church, South; founder of Vanderbilt University | |
| William P. Harrison | 1861–1862, President | Theologian and author; chaplain of the United States House of Representatives | |
| Charles B. Glenn | 1880s | Educator; president National Education Association, 1937–1938 | |
| Leonidas Warren Payne, Jr. | 1888 | Academic; editor of the first anthology of Texas literature | |
| Willie Dee Bowles | 1920s | Educator; historian of the women's suffrage movement | |
| John E. Ivey, Jr. | 1936 | Sociologist, education researcher; pioneer in use of technology in education | |

=== Sports ===
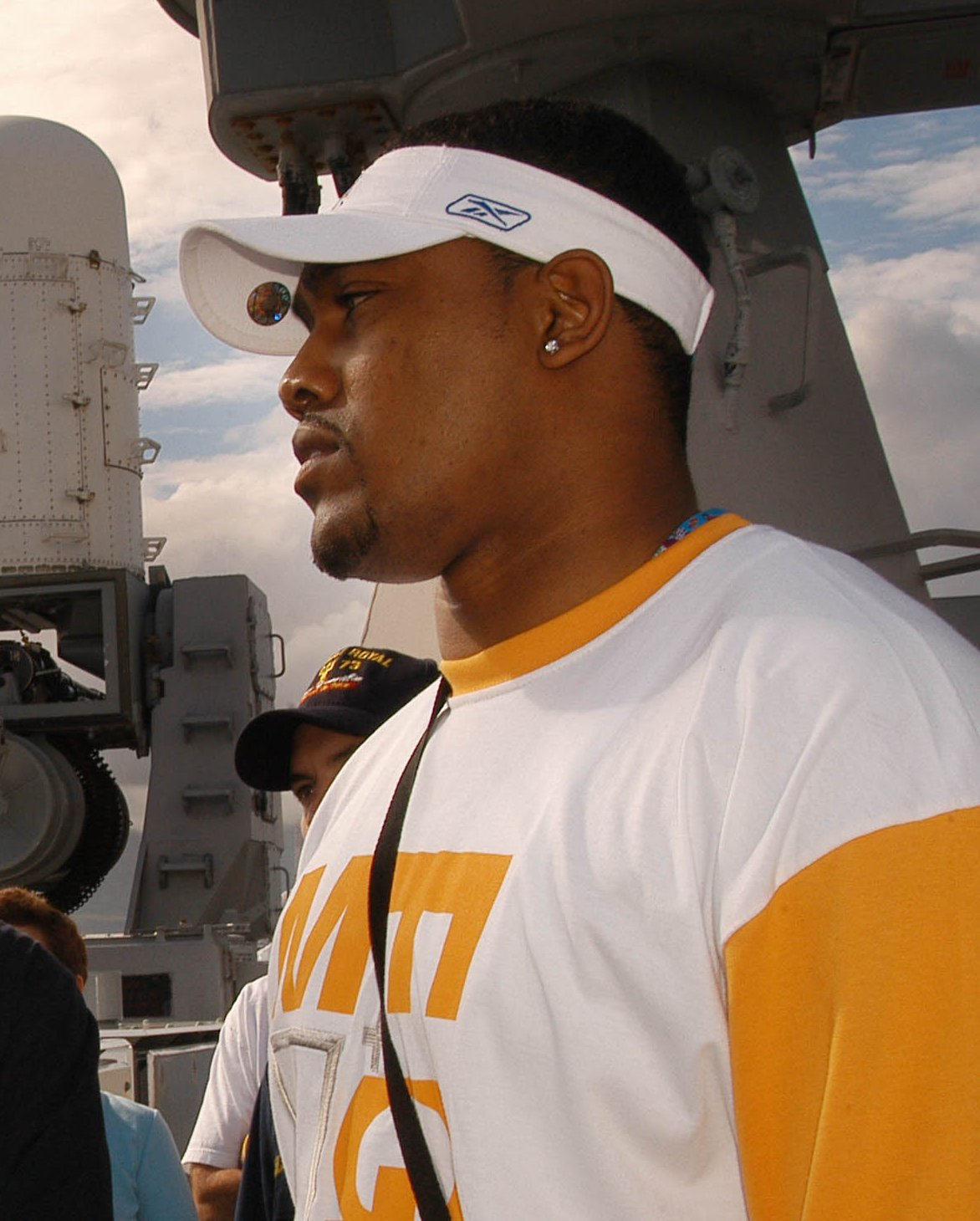
Marcus Washington (1996), NFL football player

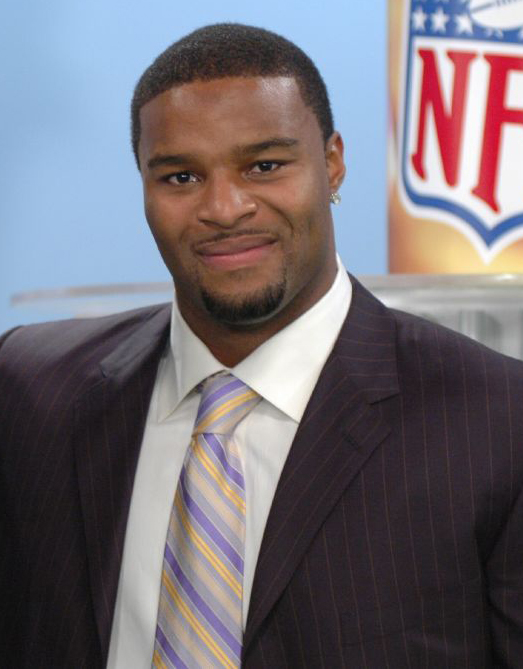
Osi Umenyiora (1999), NFL football player

| Name | Class year or years affiliated | Notability | Reference |
|---|---|---|---|
| Charlie Gibson | 1923, head football coach | Major League Baseball player, Philadelphia Athletics | |
| E. R. Moulton | 1924-25, head football coach | College football player, educator | |
| Joe Beckwith | 1973 | Major League Baseball pitcher, Los Angeles Dodgers (1979–1983, 1986) and Kansas City Royals (1984–1985); pitched in Game 4 of 1985 World Series | |
| Vic Shealy | 1979 | Defensive coordinator, Kansas Jayhawks; won national championship as head coach of Azusa Pacific University (NAIA) in 1998 | |
| David Gibbs | 1987 | Defensive backs coach, Kansas City Chiefs (2006–present), Denver Broncos (2001–2004); defensive coordinator, University of Minnesota (1997–2000), Auburn University (2005) | |
| Andre Payne | 1993 | College basketball coach | |
| Tracy Rocker | 1992–1993, defensive coordinator | NFL football player, Washington Redskins; winner of college football's Outland Trophy and Lombardi Award; member of the College Football Hall of Fame | |
| Ben Thomas | 1992–1996, teacher, football coach | NFL football player | |
| Marcus Washington | 1996 | NFL football player, Indianapolis Colts (2000–2003), Washington Redskins (2004–2009); Pro Bowl, 2005 | |
| Joe Whitt Jr. | 1997 | Football coach | |
| James Joseph | 1996–2004, teacher, football coach | NFL football player, Philadelphia Eagles, Cincinnati Bengals | |
| Osi Umenyiora | 1999 | NFL football player, New York Giants; Pro Bowl, 2006, 2008 | |
| DeMarcus Ware | 2001 | NFL football player, Dallas Cowboys; Pro Bowl, 2007–2010 | |
| Zach Clayton | 2002–2005 | NFL football player, Tennessee Titans | |
| Brandon Boudreaux | 2007 | CFL football player | |
| Jamie Hampton | 2008 | Professional tennis player | |
| Karibi Dede | 2009–2011, football coach | NFL football player, New York Giants; CFL football player, Montreal Alouettes | |
| Cody Core | 2012 | NFL football player, Cincinnati Bengals | |
| Reuben Foster | 2013 | Football player, consensus High School All-American | |
| Mohamoud Diabate | 2018 | NFL football player, Cincinnati Bengals | |
| Matthew Caldwell | 2021 | NFL football player, Los Angeles Rams | |
| Drew Bobo | 2022 | College football center, Georgia Bulldogs | |
| Omar Mabson II | 2025 | College football running back, Auburn Tigers | |

== Other people ==
=== Principals and presidents ===
John Parker Lee, Auburn Masonic Female College president, 1853

| Name | Years | Title | Reference |
|---|---|---|---|
| J. Alma Pelot | 1843–1849 | Principal | |
| William D. Williams | 1849–1851 | Principal | |
| D.S.T. Douglas | 1851–1853 | President | |
| John Parker Lee | 1853 | President | |
| John M. Darby | 1855–1858 | President | |
| E.D. Pitts | 1858–1860 | President | |
| William P. Harrison | 1861–1862 | President | |
| James K. Armstrong | 1860s | President | |
| W. F. Slaton | 1860s | Principal | |
| William Shapard | 1870s | President | |
| Henry M. Urquhart | 1878–1880 | President | |
| Theodore J. Lamar | 1880–1885 | President | |
| Gustavus J. Orr, Jr. | 1885–1887 | Principal | |
| Alicia Melton | 1885–1887 | Principal | |
| Annie W. Brockman | 1889–1891 | Principal | |
| A.G. Dowdell | 1891–1892 | Principal | |
| James J. McKee | 1892–1893 | Principal | |
| W. Hugh McKee | 1893–1895 | Principal | |
| George W. Duncan | 1895–1902 | Principal | |
| R.W. Smallwood | 1902–1904 | Principal | |
| Augustus Bogard | 1904–1907 | Principal | |
| W.F. Osburn | 1907–1910 | Principal | |
| Stanley C. Godbold | 1910–1914 | Principal | |
| I. T. Quinn | 1914–1915 | Principal | |
| J.A. Parrish | 1915–1946 | Principal | |
| V.C. Helms | 1946–1948 | Principal | |
| O.B. Hodges | 1948–1954 | Principal | |
| James R. Edmonson | 1954–1955 | Principal | |
| Russell Clark | 1956–1957 | Principal | |
| E.E. Gaither | 1957–1962 | Principal | |
| James L. Lovvorn | 1962–1968 | Principal | |
| James B. Douglas | 1968–1984 | Principal | |
| Robert Dotson | 1984–1995 | Principal | |
| Susan Hosemann | 1995–1996 | Principal | |
| Michael Self | 1996–1999 | Principal | |
| Cathy Long | 1999–2010 | Principal | |
| Todd Freeman | 2010–2013 | Principal | |
| Rick Ranier | 2013–2014 | Principal | |
| Shannon Pignato | 2014–2025 | Principal | |
| Gregory Moore | 2025-present | Principal | |

=== Fictional characters ===
| Name | Notability | Reference |
|---|---|---|
| Beach Head | A character in the G.I. Joe: A Real American Hero series | |
