= T. J. Jackson (defensive tackle) =

American football player (born 1983)

Tommy Jackson
No. 99
- Position: Defensive tackle

Personal information
- Born: December 12, 1983 (age 42); Opelika, Alabama, U.S.
- Listed height: 6 ft 1 in (1.85 m)
- Listed weight: 304 lb (138 kg)

Career information
- High school: Opelika
- College: Auburn
- NFL draft: 2006: undrafted

Career history
- Atlanta Falcons (2006); Kansas City Chiefs (2007–2008)

Awards and highlights
- First-team All-SEC (2004); Second-team All-SEC (2005)

Career NFL statistics
- Total tackles: 7
- Sacks: 1.0
- Stats at Pro Football Reference

Tommy Eugene Jackson (born December 12, 1983) is an American former professional football player who was a defensive tackle in the National Football League (NFL). He played college football for the Auburn Tigers before being signed by the Atlanta Falcons as an undrafted free agent in 2006. He also played for the Kansas City Chiefs.

== Atlanta Falcons ==
Jackson was signed as an undrafted free agent by the Atlanta Falcons in 2006. In week 7 of his rookie season, Jackson was activated as starting nose guard to replace veteran Pro Bowler Roderick Coleman, who was out with a toe injury. In his second start, Jackson got his first sack in the NFL against the Cleveland Browns. Jackson was waived by the Falcons during final cuts on September 1, 2007.

== Kansas City Chiefs ==
Two days after being released by Atlanta, Jackson was signed to the practice squad of the Kansas City Chiefs on September 3, 2007. Following the season, he was re-signed by the Chiefs. Jackson spent most of the 2008 season on the practice squad but did play in four games for the Chiefs in 2008, recording two tackles. He was re-signed to a future contract on December 30. He was waived on June 19, 2009. Jackson then turned down the opportunity to play for the Philadelphia Eagles.

== After football ==
Jackson served two years (2011–2013) in the Student-Athlete Support Services Department at Auburn where he assisted student-athletes. He spent one year working as program director for the at-risk student program within the Opelika City Schools system in Opelika, Alabama, and served as a defensive line coach at Opelika High School.

In 2014, Jackson became an athletics academic counselor at Kennesaw State University after most serving as a sports analyst at Fox 6 News in Birmingham, Alabama. In December 2015, Jackson from graduated Kennesaw State with an MBA and MPA. Jackson serves as an assistant professor of higher education administration at the University of West Georgia.
