= LaMarcus =

LaMarcus is a given name. Notable people with the name include:

- LaMarcus Adna Thompson (1848–1919), American inventor and businessman
- LaMarcus Aldridge (born 1985), American basketball player
- Lamarcus Brutus (born 1993), American football player
- LaMarcus Coker (born 1986), American football player
- LaMarcus Hicks (born 1983), American football player
- Lamarcus Joyner (born 1990), American football player
- LaMarcus McDonald (born 1981), American football player
- LaMarcus Tinker (born 1990), American actor

== See also ==
- LeMarcus
