= Poetry Out Loud =

The Poetry Out Loud Recitation Contest was created in 2006 by the National Endowment for the Arts under chairman Dana Gioia and The Poetry Foundation. The contest seeks to promote the art of performing poetry, by awarding cash prizes to participating schools. It includes representatives from the fifty states, the District of Columbia, Puerto Rico, and the U.S. Virgin Islands.

== Competition ==
The contest features some 900 poems for students to choose from. Typically, the competition begins at the school level, where the students recite one or two poems. The first and sometimes second place winners of each school-level competition attend regional competitions. The finalist(s) from each region attend state-level competitions to perform three poems. Each state winner performs the same three poems in Washington D.C. during the last week of April or the first week of May.

Competitors are divided into three groups or regions. Each region holds a semi-final and sends three (formerly four) competitors to the final round. The final nine then recite two poems, and the top three recite a third poem. Judges (who are usually poetry/literary celebrities) select the 1st, 2nd, and 3rd place winners. The 1st place winner wins $20,000, the 2nd place winner wins $10,000, and the 3rd place winner wins $5,000. The 4th-9th place takes home $1,000. All 53 finalists win $200 from their state competition, along with a stipend for their high school to purchase poetry books.

== Poem criteria ==
Contestants have specific criteria for the poems at the state and national levels. All poems must be selected from an online or paper anthology to be eligible for competition. One poem must be pre-20th century, and one must be 25 lines or fewer. One poem can account for both criteria, leaving the second and third poems unrestricted. These rules aim to expose students to poetry that they otherwise may not have been interested in and set a standard that all students are held accountable to, while also ensuring that the poetry is not obscene or overly long.

== Winners ==
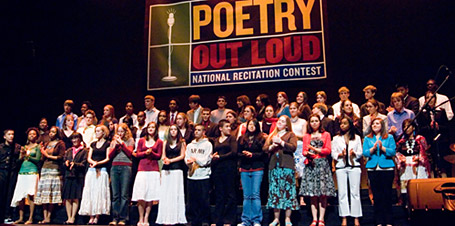
The 2006 State Champions of the Poetry Out Loud National Recitation Contest.

2006 - Jackson Hille of Columbus Alternative High School in Ohio became National Champion. Teal Van Dyck of Bow High School in New Hampshire won second place. Kellie Anae of Mid-Pacific Institute in Hawaii won third place.

2007 - The 2007 National Poetry Out Loud Champion was Amanda Fernandez, of the District of Columbia. Branden Emanual Wellington of Indiana placed second, and third place went to Alanna Rivera, of Virginia.

2008 - Representing the Virgin Islands, Shawntay Henry became the 2008 National Champion; the first time the Virgin Islands participated. Ms. Henry was a 10th-grade student at the time. Her competition-winning poems included "Fredrick Douglas", by Robert Hayden.

2009 - More than 300,000 students competed in the nationwide competition in 2009. First Place went to Washington-Lee High School in Arlington, Virginia student William Farley. Second place was awarded to Barbara Gooding of Kentucky. Kareem Sayegh, representing Illinois, was awarded third place. Fourth and fifth place went to Mido Aly of Ohio, and Wiyaka His Horse Is Thunder of South Dakota.

2010 - First Place went to the representative from Rhode Island, Amber Rose Johnson. Second place was awarded to Ruth Haile, of South Dakota. Nora Sandler, representing Maryland, was awarded third place.

2011 - Youssef Biaz of Auburn High School in Auburn, Alabama captured the national title with his reading of Elizabeth Bishop's "Filling Station". The runner-up prize went to Victoria DiMartile of Fort Mitchell, Kentucky, while DeVonna Daisy Smith of Reading, Pennsylvania placed third.

2012 - Kristen Dupard of Ridgeland, Mississippi was named the 2012 National Champion. Rounding out the top three were Claude Mumbere of Burlington, Vermont in second place and MarKaye Hassan of Logan, Utah in third place.

2013 - Langston Ward of Spokane, Washington won first prize with his recitation of "The Gift" by Li-Young Lee at the 2013 National Finals. In second place was Blessed Sheriff of Rockville, Maryland. The third prize went to Denise L. Burns of Lawton, Oklahoma.

2014 - Representing Tennessee, Anita Norman won first place for her performance of "Let the Light Enter" by Frances Ellen Watkins Harper. Columbus, Ohio, and Lawrenceville, New Jersey were also honored by the second and third-place finishers, Lake Wilburn and Natasha Simone Vargas, respectively.

2015 - Reciting "Ode on a Grecian Urn" by John Keats, Maeva Ordaz of Anchorage, Alaska claimed first place. Reciting the same poem, Paris Stroud of Dallas, Georgia took home the second prize. Casey Goggin from Southern Pines, North Carolina placed third.

2016 - Ahkei Togun of Virginia Beach, Virginia won first place with his recitation of "I'm a Fool to Love You" by Cornelius Eady. Marta Palombo from Atlanta, Georgia secured second place, while Nicholas Amador of Punahou, Hawaii took third.

2017 - Samara Huggins of Mableton, Georgia was awarded first place after her reading of "Novel" by Arthur Rimbaud. Also successful was second-time national finalist Nicholas Amador of Punahou, Hawaii. Iree Mann from Syosset, New York was third.

2018 - Charleston, South Carolina native Janae Claxton won first place with C.K. Williams' "The Gaffe." For the third year in a row, Nicholas Amador of Punahou, Hawaii claimed a top spot, earning a second-place to finish off his senior year competition. Third place was awarded to Hope Stratman from Omaha, Nebraska.

2019 - Minnesota high school senior student, Isabella Callery won the title of the 2019 Poetry Out Loud National Championship for her recitations of poems by Joy Harjo, Natalie Diaz, and Charles Lamb.

2020 - The national competition was cancelled due to COVID-19; instead, state winners and winners from regional competitions that didn't get to participate in cancelled state competitions were honored.

2021 - Rahele Megosha of South Dakota won the national competition.

2022 - Mia Ronn of California won the national competition.

== State summaries ==
State	1st	2nd	3rd	Total
Hawaii	3	1		4
Georgia	1	2		3
Nebraska		3		3
Kentucky	2			2
Maryland		1	1	2
Ohio	1	1		2
Virginia	2			2
Alaska	1			1
Illinois			1	1
Maryland		1		1
Minnesota	1			1
Mississippi	1			1
New Hampshire		1		1
New Jersey		1		1
New York		1		1
Oklahoma			1	1
Pennsylvania			1	1
South Carolina	1			1
South Dakota	1			1
North Carolina		1		1
Tennessee	1			1
Utah			1	1
Vermont	1			1
VirginIslands	1			1
Washington	1			1
