= Opelika High School =

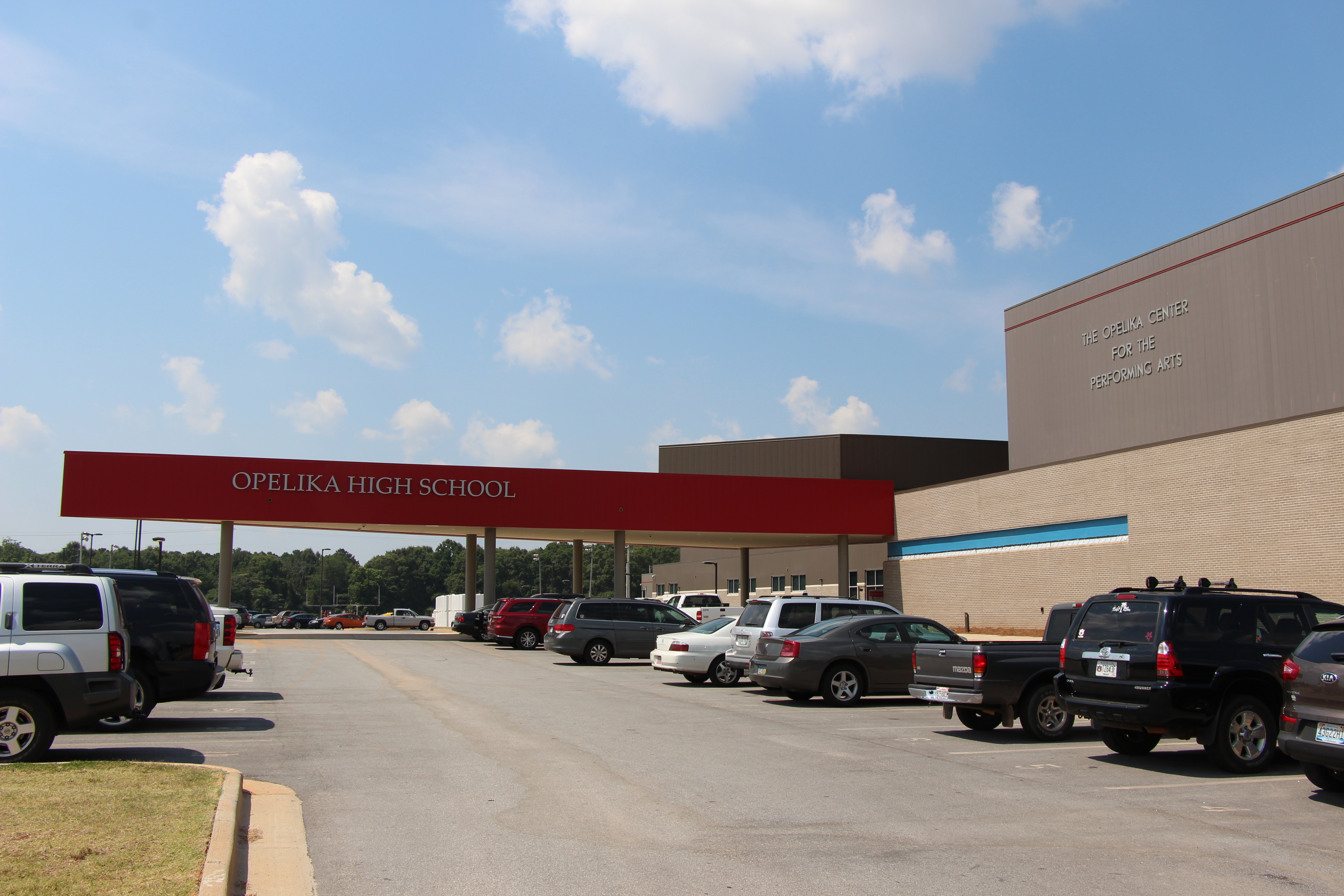
- Opelika High School front entrance

Location
- 1700 Lafayette Pkwy; Opelika, Alabama 36801; United States
- 32°40′06″N 85°22′11″W

Information
- Established: 1911 (115 years ago)
- Status: Active
- School district: Opelika City Schools
- Superintendent: Dr. Kevin Davis
- CEEB code: 012055
- Principal: Kelli Fischer
- Teaching staff: 94.00 (FTE)
- Grades: 9-12
- Enrollment: 1,590 (2024-2025)
- Student to teacher ratio: 16.91
- Colors: Red and black
- Athletics: AHSAA (7A)
- Nickname: Bulldogs
- Newspaper: Mainstreet Gazette
- Yearbook: Zig-Zag
- Website: ohs.opelikaschools.org

Opelika High School is located in Opelika, Lee County, Alabama and was originally built in 1972. Opelika High School, of the Opelika City Schools, serves students in grades 9–12. The principal is Kelli Fischer.

== History ==
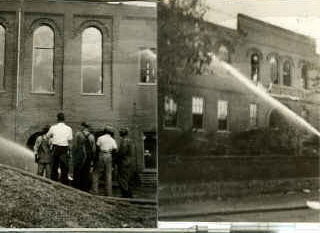
Opelika High School burns, 1917.

While several private high schools, including two that went by the name "Opelika High School", existed in Opelika as early as the 1860s. The current Opelika High School wasn't founded until 1911. From 1902 to 1911, Opelika offered classes through the 10th grade at the Opelika Public School, but was not able to afford a high school. A 1907 law called for the formation of a "county high school" in each county run by the county board of education; when the state high school commission looked to establish such a high school in Lee County in 1911, only Opelika applied, and so the school was located there. This school's opening in the fall of 1911 marks the founding of Opelika High School. In 1914, Auburn High School successfully petitioned the state high school commission to take the county flagship status as the "Lee County High School" away from Opelika, starting the two schools long-standing rivalry, and the Opelika school became officially known as "Opelika High School" for the first time, operating as a town school.

Opelika kept the old county high school building until 1917. On January 20, 1917, Opelika High School burned to the ground. The two prior private schools in Opelika named "Opelika High School" also burned, in 1867 and in 1894. For the next year, classes were held in the old Opelika Public School building, until a new structure could be built on the same grounds. With the new building, Opelika High School was renamed in 1918 Henry G. Clift High School, after the then-mayor of Opelika. Opelika High School football started in 1922, with OHS falling to Alexander City (today Benjamin Russell) 71–0 in both schools' first-ever game. It would be 1925 before Opelika High met Auburn High for the first time on the gridiron, a 21–6 loss; the Bulldogs and Tigers have met each year in football since 1933, with the OHS leading the overall series 42–38–3.

In 1959, Opelika High moved into a new building on Denson Drive and was subsequently renamed "Opelika High School" again. In 1972, OHS moved again, this time into the current facility on LaFayette Parkway.

In August 2014, a $46 million renovation and construction project was completed. The new building contains 87 new classrooms on two floors including seven computer labs. Each classroom is outfitted with a Promethean interactive whiteboard, projector and ELMO document camera. The business technology labs have with ClearTouch 70” interactive displays that are fully integrated with new educational software. New classrooms include general classrooms for core classes, science labs, an ACCESS computer lab for distance learning and specialty classrooms for Consumer Science, Health Science, Driver's Education, Art, Special Education, Business Tech, Engineering, Publishing and Horticulture. OHS also features a new cafeteria, kitchen and serving area. Following the renovation, the school's Bulldog Stadium now has a turf field, new concession areas, new restrooms and ticket booths. A 22,000 square foot indoor athletic facility including a turf practice field, varsity locker room, coaches' offices and meeting rooms were also built during renovations. Additionally, renovations were also completed for the OHS baseball field, the women's athletic facility, and the girls' and boys' physical education areas.

== Publications ==
Opelika High School students produce a school newspaper called "The Bulldog". The Bulldog includes Editorial, Entertainment, News, Feature, Sports, and Club News sections. The staff sells ads to local businesses to fund the paper, which is printed by Media General.

The high school's yearbook is titled "Zig-Zag."

== Perspectives magazine ==
Students also prepare and distribute a literary-art magazine of student-submitted work called Perspectives. It is published once a year and distributed during the spring semester. Charles Hannah started the magazine in 1987 as an after-school activity. Since then, Perspectives has become a full class that meets first block every other day.

Perspectives magazine achievements

Alabama Scholastic Press All Alabama: 1997, 2002–04, 2006–08 Superior: 1996, 1999, 2005, 2009–11 Excellent: 2000–01

Alabama Writers Forum Certificate of Commendation: 2001 Exceptional Graphic Design: 2002, 2004, 2005, 2007, 2008 Best Overall Literary Content & Graphic Design: 2003

American Scholastic Press First Place with Special Merit: 1997–2011 Most Outstanding High School Literary-Art Magazine: 2001, 2003, 2007–08, 2010–11 First Place: 1996

Columbia Scholastic Press Gold Medalist Certificate: 1997–99, 2001–11 Silver Medalist Certificate: 2000

NCTE Superior: 1997, 1999–2002, 2004, 2007–11 Highest Award: 1996, 1998, 2003, 2005–06

== Athletics ==
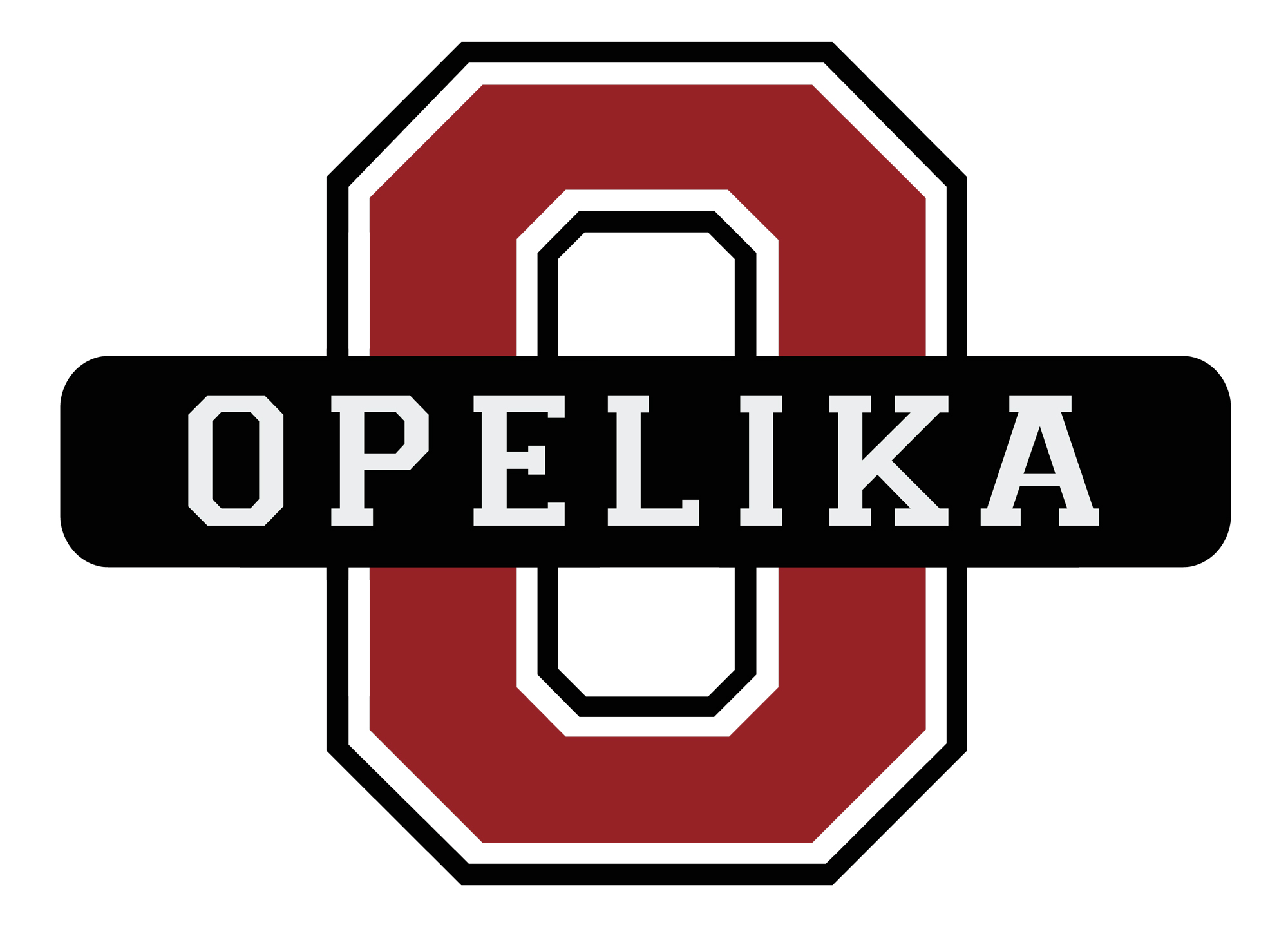
The Official Opelika City Schools Logo

Opelika competes in class 7A of the AHSAA. The mascot is the bulldog. More specifically, there are 2 bulldogs called "Ope" and "Lika" which represent Opelika High School. The school colors are red and black. The school fields 12 varsity sports teams:

- Football
- Baseball
- Softball
- Wrestling
- Track and Field (Boys and Girls)
- Cross Country (Boys and Girls)
- Volleyball (Girls)
- Basketball (Boys and Girls)
- Soccer (Boys and Girls)
- Golf (Boys and Girls)
- Tennis (Boys and Girls)
- Flag Football (Girls)

== Football achievements ==
- 2012 6A State Champion Runner Up
- 2009 6A State Champion Runner Up
- 2008 Region 3 AHSAA Championship
- 2007 Region 3 AHSAA Championship
- 1998 Area 5 AHSAA Championship

== Track and field achievements ==
=== Boys ===
- 2021 6A Indoor and Outdoor State Champions
- 2017 6A Indoor and Outdoor State Champions
- 2016 6A Indoor and Outdoor State Champions
- 2015 6A Outdoor State Champions
- 2007 6A Outdoor State Champions
- 2006 6A Outdoor State Champions
- 2004 6A Outdoor State Champions
- 2003 6A Outdoor State Champions
- 2000 6A Outdoor State Champions
- 1999 6A Outdoor State Champions
- 1998 6A Outdoor State Champions
- 1997 6A Outdoor Freshman State Champions

== Tennis achievements ==
=== Boys ===
- 1991 6A State Champions
- 1979 6A Individual State Champion.

== Wrestling achievements ==
=== Team State Champion ===
1958 (Opelika High School was also known as Clift)

1956 (Opelika High School was also known as Clift)

== Other organizations ==
=== Opelika High Theatre Society ===
Opelika High School band

The Opelika High Theatre Society is known around the region and state for its quality performances. A play in the fall, an advanced theatre competition at mid-year and a spring musical all attract hundreds from surrounding communities. In 2014, the cast of The Quilt won "Best Ensemble" and "Best of Show" at the State Trumbauer Theatre Festival. In addition to performances, theatre department courses include set design, set-up and light/sound production. Past productions include Sweeney Todd, Oliver, Les Misérables, Beauty and the Beast, Our Town, Brighton Beach Memoirs, the Sound of Music and many more.

=== Showchoir ===
Four different choirs are offered by the OHS choral department: the Ovations coed show choir, the Impressions girls’ show choir, Gospel Choir and Chamber Choir. The show choir groups perform and compete all over the country and have received countless accolades including Grand Champion in the Fame Showchoir America Competition in Washington, D.C., Best Show Design, Best Choreography and Best Vocals awards in numerous competitions, and was the highest ranked Alabama school in the 2009 National Showchoir Ranking System.

=== Bands ===
The Opelika Band program is a source of pride for the Opelika City School System, its students, as well as parents and the entire community. The band program begins in the 6th grade at Fox Run School and continues through the 12th grade at Opelika High School. The band maintains 20% of the student population, almost 350 students.

Beginning in 6th grade, students at Fox Run are encouraged to discover their musical talents in Beginning Band. Students have the opportunity to “audition” the instruments and become acquainted with the basics of music notation as well as proper technique on the instrument. As students progress, they may be invited to become a member of the Concert Band. This band consists of students who are progressing adequately but may need further instruction before moving into the Symphonic Band.

Students who progress to the 8th grade can become members of the Symphonic Band. This group is composed of students who have achieved their musical goals in the 7th grade and intend on being a part of the band into high school. This band has maintained a long history of success whether it is being recognized at Music Performance Assessment or competing in competitive festivals in Orlando, FL.

Opelika Middle School Bands have also featured Percussion Ensembles as the schedule allows.

The Opelika High School Band Program consists of several music ensembles: The Marching band, Wind Ensemble, Symphonic Band, Concert Band, and Jazz Band. There are also two new indoor visual ensembles, the Winter Guard and Indoor Percussion Ensemble and Concert Percussion Ensemble. Below is a brief description of each ensemble.

The Opelika High School Marching Band, also known as “The Spirit of the South” meets and practices during the summer and through the fall semester. With rehearsals after school, this ensemble regularly practices and works towards achieving a high level of musicianship and marching technique. This group performs at every football game and competes at marching competitions throughout the year. The marching band averages 200 students per year and consists of the 8th–12th grade students who play wind or percussion instruments along with a visual ensemble made up of majorettes, color guard, and the “Showstoppers” kickline. The “Spirit of the South” has traveled to many different destinations throughout the southeast and the nation. Some of the more recent trips and achievements have been multiple trips to Orlando, Philadelphia, and Chicago in 2011 to participate in the St. Patrick's Day Parade. The “Spirit of the South” has twice performed in Macy's Thanksgiving Day Parade, in 1989 and 1994.

=== FFA ===
Opelika High School's FFA includes over 300 members.

=== Vibe ===
The Opelika High School vibe is a class that students audition for each position. It features singers, guitar players, bass players, drummers, and a pianist. They perform multiple styles of music from rock to pop and jazz to hip-hop. They were a part of the first annual Troy University Open mic event in 2017. They have concerts each year in the lunchroom, as well as in the OPAC (Opelika Performing Arts Center) auditorium.

== Notable former students ==
- Mallory Hagan (class of 2007), Miss America 2013
- Robert L. Howard, awarded the Medal of Honor for his service in the Vietnam War
- William S. Key, major general during World War II
- LeMarcus Rowell, former CFL linebacker for the Calgary Stampeders
- Dusty Slay (class of 2000), comedian
- Joe Thomas, R&B singer and entertainer
- James S. Voss, astronaut who flew in space five times on board the Space Shuttle and International Space Station

=== Professional baseball players ===
Player name	College team	Position	Draft Pick	Career Duration	MLB team
Roy Lee Jackson	Tuskegee	P	Round 2 / Pick: 273	1977–1986	New York Mets, Toronto, San Diego, Minnesota
Rod Lindsey	None	OF	Round 39 / Pick: 1074	2000-2000	Detroit

=== Professional football players ===
Player name	College team	Position	Draft Pick	Career Duration	NFL team
Corey Grant	Auburn	RB	UDFA	2015–2019	Jacksonville, Green Bay*
Zach Clayton	Auburn	DT	Round: 7 / Pick: 212	2011–2012	Tennessee
Will Herring	Auburn	LB	Round: 5 / Pick: 161	2007–2015	Seattle, New Orleans, St. Louis
T.J. Jackson	Auburn	DT	Free Agent	2006–2008	Atlanta, Kansas City
Melvin Oliver	LSU	DT	Round: 6 / Pick: 197	2006–2007	San Francisco
