= LeMarcus Rowell =

American gridiron football player (born 1982)

No. 19
- Position: Linebacker

Personal information
- Born: December 10, 1982 (age 43); Opelika, Alabama, U.S.
- Listed height: 6 ft 2 in (1.88 m)
- Listed weight: 218 lb (99 kg)

Career information
- High school: Opelika
- College: Jacksonville State
- NFL draft: 2007: undrafted

Career history
- Calgary Stampeders (2008–2009)

Awards and highlights
- Grey Cup champion (2008)
- Stats at CFL.ca (archive)

LeMarcus Rowell (born December 10, 1982) is an American former professional football linebacker who played for the Calgary Stampeders of the Canadian Football League (CFL). He was originally signed by the Stampeders as an undrafted free agent in 2008. He played college football at Jacksonville State.
