= Robert D. Knapp =

United States Air Force general

- Robert D. Knapp with Airco DH.4 bomber, ca. 1920
- Born: December 26, 1897; Moreland, Georgia
- Died: April 25, 1994 (aged 96)
- Burial place: Arlington National Cemetery
- Military career
- Allegiance: United States of America
- Branch: United States Air Force
- Service years: 1918–1953
- Rank: Brigadier General
- Commands: Air Corps Primary Flying School, Brooks Field; 44th Observation Squadron; 7th Observation Squadron; 321st Bombardment Group; 57th Bomb Wing
- Conflicts: World War I World War II; Korean War
- Awards: Silver Star; Distinguished Flying Cross; Bronze Star

Robert Duane Knapp, Jr. (December 26, 1897 – April 25, 1994) was a brigadier general in the United States Air Force and an aviation pioneer. He held United States pilot license #185 and led the first Allied aerial attack on Rome in World War II. Knapp received a Silver Star for leading an unescorted bombing raid on a fighter-defended Axis convoy in 1944.

== Early life ==
Robert D. Knapp was born in Moreland, Georgia, but grew up in Auburn, Alabama. When Knapp was 10 years old, the Wright Brothers stayed in his home for a short time while consulting with professors at nearby Alabama Polytechnic Institute, an event which shaped Knapp's future career.

== Military career ==
After completing his studies at Auburn High School in 1917, Knapp applied for Army officer training, but was turned down due to his age. Instead, he was accepted as an aviation cadet, receiving his wings and being commissioned as a second lieutenant on March 9, 1918. Knapp went to the United Kingdom with his unit, the 92d Aero Squadron (Bombardment), in August 1918, but failed to see action in World War I due to a late shipment of propellers for his unit's Handley Page O/400 bombers.

After returning from Europe, Knapp was assigned to the 96th Aero Squadron, charged with aerially patrolling the US-Mexican border after a Mexican cross-border raid on El Paso, Texas in 1919. In 1921, he was given command of Flight "A" of 12th Aero Squadron at Camp Stephen B. Little in Nogales, Arizona, where for the next two years he patrolled the Arizona border. In 1923, he was transferred to Maxwell Field in Montgomery, Alabama for aerial mapping missions; while there, he flew the first air mail route between Montgomery and New Orleans, Louisiana. After four years at Maxwell, Knapp was assigned to Kelly Field in San Antonio, Texas, where he was a flying instructor at the flight school. Having been promoted to commandant of the Air Corps Primary Flying School at nearby Brooks Field in 1929, he was appointed commanding officer of the 44th Observation Squadron in the Panama Canal Zone in 1931. He later commanded the 7th Observation Squadron, also in Panama, before returning to Kelly Field in 1934 as Director of Flying Training.

Knapp in 1937 led a 98-aircraft squadron of Advanced Flying School students on a cross-country tour to recruit ROTC cadets into aviation. In 1938, he attended Air Corps Tactical School and was an instructor for the 154th Observation Squadron of the Arkansas National Guard. He became the executive officer of the 1st Bomber Command at Langley Field near Hampton, Virginia in 1940.

=== World War II ===
After the United States entered World War II in 1941, Knapp organized six bombardier groups, trained three of them, and took command of one, the 321st Bombardment Group. The 321st was assigned to North Africa, flying raids against Axis forces in B-25 Mitchell bombers. In July 1943, The 321st launched the first full-scale US bombing raid on an Axis capital with Knapp flying the lead plane in an attack on Rome. In 1944, he led an attack—without fighter escort—on an Axis shipping convoy that had fighter protection. For that attack, he was awarded a Silver Star. Later in 1944, he was promoted to brigadier general and given command of the 57th Bomb Wing, a position he held for the remainder of the war.

== Later life ==
After the war, Knapp became chief of the US Air Force Mission to Argentina. He retired from the Air Force in 1953, and returned home to Auburn, Alabama. Robert D. Knapp died in Alabama on April 25, 1994.
