= T. Edward Vives =

T. Edward (Ted) Vives originated the FSU Seminole War Chant in 1985, a trombonist and composer, is the musical director of the Los Alamos Community Winds.

Originally from Auburn, Alabama, Dr. Vives began music studies at the age of 4, taking piano and theory lessons from Edgar and Dorothy Glyde. His musical interests changed to trombone performance and composition upon entering the public school system. Vives holds bachelor's degrees in both composition and music education from Florida State University where he studied with John Boda, Roy Johnson, and Charles Carter. He also holds a Masters of Music in Composition and a Ph.D. in Music Education from the University of Florida where he studied with Budd Udell and John D. White.

He is a member of Kappa Kappa Psi National Band Service Fraternity (Gamma Nu chapter, Florida State University) Phi Mu Alpha Sinfonia, (Epsilon Iota chapter, Florida State University) and Tau Beta Sigma (honorary member, Alpha Omega chapter, Florida State University) and Phi Kappa Phi Honor Society.

He has taught in the public schools in Florida and has served as a clinician at band and music camps in many states. His marching and concert band arrangements have been performed nationwide. In 2003 and 2010 he was selected as the Professional Music Teachers of New Mexico's (Music Teachers National Association State Affiliate) Commissioned Composer.

He is the winner of the 2011 American Prize in Composition (Choral Division);

Dr. Vives’ compositions and arrangements are published by Manduca Music Publications and Survives Music.

== Works ==
=== Orchestra ===
- Introduction and Overture (From Palms to Poplars) (2002)
- Symphony No. 1 (2005)
- Tombeé de la Nuit (2005
- Absence (2005)
- Wedding Suite (2006)
- Children's Suite (2007)
- Fanfare de melodías populares de Nuevo México (2009)
- Kilmartin Glen - A Sculpture in Stones (2009)
- Suite l'Montgolfiere (2019)

=== Concert band ===
- Hilltopper Zia March (2000)
- ...and they pealed more loud and deep. (2003) Winner of the 2003 North Cheshire Concert Band Composition Competition;
- For the Fair and the Brave (2004)
- The Los Alamos Firefighters March (2011)
- N.B.I. (2012)
- ...and they named it Trinity (2013)
- Mother Earth - Variations on a Tewa Melody (2025)
- Concerto for Cello and Concert Band (2026)

=== Vocal, Choral, and Opera ===
- Riddles (1993) Opera based on J.R.R. Tolkien's The Hobbit
- Borean Visions (1995) for Concert Band and Chorus
- Verbum Continuum (1997) for Soprano, Alto Saxophone, and Piano
- Reflections of '63 (1997) for Tenor, Trumpet, Violoncello, Guitar, and Percussion
- Circaré (1998)
- Vigil Mass for the Risen Lord (2002, rev. 2012)
- Lux Aeterna (2008) Runner-up in the 2009 Sacra Profana Choral Composition Competition
- Castrovalva (2009)
- The Soldier (2011)
- elegy (2012)
- Nursery Rhymes (2012)
- Premonition (2012)
- Scientific Method- A New STEM Musical (2020)
- Three Langston Hughes Settings (2023)
- Missa Critica (2024)

=== Chamber music ===
- Woodwind Quintet No. 1 (Four for Five) (1994)
- Delineations (1998) for Trombone and Piano
- Brass Quintet (2002)
- Elan con Brio (2003) for Bassoon, Trombone, and Piano Duo
- Undisonus Praeconare (2003) for Brass Ensemble
- Episode an Ailes (2006) for Flute Choir
- Fete (2009) for Piano Duo
- The Music Lesson (2010) for Soprano, 2 Trombones, and Piano
- Bittersweet Covenant (2011) for Alto Saxophone, String Quartet, and Piano
