= William P. Harrison =

Methodist minister and theologian, Chaplain of the United States House of Representatives

William P. Harrison

William Pope Harrison (September 3, 1830 – February 7, 1895) was an American Methodist minister and theologian, and was the 48th Chaplain of the United States House of Representatives. He was an author of books on Methodist theology, most notably The Gospel among the Slaves, the first comprehensive accounting of the religious beliefs of African American slaves in the United States.

Harrison was born in Savannah, Georgia, and attended the preparatory school of Emory College. In 1850, he became an itinerant minister of the Methodist Episcopal Church, South. In 1859, he was appointed to the faculty of the East Alabama Male College in Auburn, Alabama as Adjunct Professor of Languages, and from 1861 through 1862 was president of the Auburn Female College, today Auburn High School. He returned to Emory, receiving the Doctor of Divinity degree in 1866. Later that year, Harrison became pastor of the First Methodist Church in Atlanta, Georgia, the first of four terms as pastor there, the last of which ended in 1877.

Harrison was elected Chaplain of the United States House of Representatives on December 3, 1877. He served in that capacity for the 45th and 46th United States Congress, before resigning in 1881. In 1882, Harrison was elected book editor of the Methodist Episcopal, South publishing house, a position he held for the remainder of his life. Harrison was a delegate to the First (1881) and Second (1891) World Methodist Councils, and was Secretary of the Methodist General Conference in 1890. Harrison died on February 7, 1895, in Columbus, Georgia.

== Bibliography ==
- Theophilus Walton, or, The majesty of truth a reply to Theodosia Ernest. (1858). Nashville, Tenn: Published for the author by Stevenson & Owen.
- Lights and shadows of forty years. (1883). Nashville, Tenn: Southern Methodist Publishing House.
- The living Christ: the life and the light of men. (1883). Nashville, Tenn: Southern Methodist Publishing House.
- Ministerial freedom. (1884). Nashville, Tenn: Southern Methodist Pub. House.
- Studies in the Gospel according to St. John. (1885). Nashville, Tenn: Southern Methodist Pub. House.
- The high-churchman disarmed: a defense of our Methodist fathers. (1886). Nashville: Southern Methodist Pub. House.
- The scripture mode of baptism. (1888). Nashville: Southern Methodist Pub. House.
- The Wesleyan standards: sermons by the Rev. John Wesley. (1888). Nashville, Tenn: Pub. House of the M.E. Church, South.
- The doctrines and discipline of the Methodist Episcopal Church, South. (1890). Nashville, Tenn: Barbee & Smith.
- Methodist Union. (1892). Nashville, Tenn: Pub. House Methodist Episcopal Church, South.
- The Gospel among the slaves. (1893). Nashville, Tenn: Pub. House of the M.E. Church, South.
- The Codex Vaticanus: an essay prepared by request of the Tennessee Historical Society. (1894). Nashville: Pub. House of the Methodist Episcopal Church South.

Religious titles
Preceded by John Poise	49th US House Chaplain; December 3, 1877 – December 5, 1881	Succeeded by Frederick Dunglison Power
