= Los Alamos Community Winds =

Wind ensemble in New Mexico, US

The Los Alamos Community Winds (LACW) is a musical ensemble established in 2001. It is made up of members of the Los Alamos, New Mexico community and is composed of both amateur and professional musicians of all ages and backgrounds ranging from middle and high school students to retirees. The ensemble was recently awarded 1st Runner-up for the American Prize for Wind Ensembles and Concert Bands (Community Division.)

== History ==
The concert band has had a long history in Los Alamos and has seen various incarnations since the 1970s. Jan MacDonald, former band director at Los Alamos High School was director of the Los Alamos Concert Band (LACB) from the 1970s through the 1990s. The LACB performances included many weekly summer concerts as well as performing at various civic functions such as the 4th of July fireworks celebrations. The LACW is the latest organization to provide concert band performances to the Los Alamos community.

== Notable people ==
- Ted Vives, director
