= Youssef Biaz =

American spoken word artist

- Born: Youssef Biaz; June 14, 1994 (age 31); Fez, Morocco
- Years active: 2010–present

Youssef Biaz (born June 14, 1994) is a spoken word artist and Google software engineer from Auburn, Alabama. He was the 2011 national champion of the poetry recitation contest Poetry Out Loud.

Biaz began competing in the competition in 2010 as a junior at Auburn High School under the direction of coach Davis Thompson. He won the state championship and competed at the national competition in Washington D.C. He finished the 2010 competition as one of the nine finalists. Biaz competed again in 2011 as a senior at Auburn High. He became the recurring state champion and returned to the national competition. Biaz finished the finals on Friday, April 29 with the poem Filling Station by Elizabeth Bishop. Biaz won the competition and received a reward of $20,000 as well as a $500 stipend for Auburn High School for the purchase of poetry books.

Biaz was invited to a celebration of poetry at the White House attended by President Barack Obama on May 11, 2011. He recited the poem Mrs. Kirkorian by Sharon Olds. Other performers present included Billy Collins, Steve Martin, and Common.
