= Zach Clayton =

American football player (born 1988)

No. 69
- Position: Defensive tackle

Personal information
- Born: January 1, 1988 (age 38); Champaign, Illinois, U.S.
- Listed height: 6 ft 2 in (1.88 m)
- Listed weight: 299 lb (136 kg)

Career information
- High school: Opelika (Opelika, Alabama)
- College: Auburn
- NFL draft: 2011: 7th round, 212th overall pick

Career history
- Tennessee Titans (2011–2012)

Awards and highlights
- BCS national champion (2011)

Career NFL statistics
- Total tackles: 3
- Stats at Pro Football Reference

Zachary Alan Clayton (born January 1, 1988) is an American former professional football player who was a defensive tackle in the National Football League (NFL). He was selected by the Tennessee Titans in the seventh round of the 2011 NFL draft. He played college football for the Auburn Tigers.

== Early life ==
Clayton played three years of football at Auburn High School in Auburn, Alabama, as well as excelling in the discus and shot put for the 9-time state champion Tigers. Midway through his junior season a move required him to transfer to rival Opelika High School in Opelika, Alabama, where he finished his high school career in 2005. He was named to the Alabama Sports Writers Association 6A All-State Team as a senior.

Clayton was considered a two-star recruit by Rivals.com in 2006.

== College career ==
Clayton redshirted his freshman year at Auburn in 2006, and saw action in 10 games in 2007. He started one game in 2008, totaling 22 tackles and finished 15th in the SEC in sacks per game as a sophomore. Clayton's junior season in 2009 was marred by injury and he only played in six games, with seven tackles on the season. 2010 saw Clayton start all 14 games, with 28 tackles (8 tackles for loss), including three tackles and one sack in the 2011 BCS National Championship Game vs. the Oregon Ducks.

== Professional career ==
Pre-draft measurables
Height	Weight	40-yard dash	10-yard split	20-yard split	20-yard shuttle	Three-cone drill	Vertical jump	Broad jump	Bench press
6 ft 2 in (1.88 m)	299 lb (136 kg)	4.85 s	1.71 s	2.71 s	4.44 s	7.37 s	33.5 in (0.85 m)	10 ft 8 in (3.25 m)	27 reps
All values from Pro Day

Clayton was taken with the 212th overall pick in the seventh round of the 2011 NFL draft by the Tennessee Titans. He played in three games for the Titans during the 2011 season. He was released by the team on August 30, 2013.
