= Opelika City Schools =

School district in Alabama

Location
- 300 Simmons Street, Opelika, AL 36801 Opelika, Alabama United States

District information
- Type: Public
- Motto: "Educate Every Child, Every Day"
- Grades: K–12
- Superintendent: Dr. Kevin Davis
- Asst. superintendent(s): Dr. Pam Fourtenbary, Ms. Tiffany Yelder
- Schools: three primary schools (K–2), three intermediate schools (3–5), one middle school (6–8), one high school (9–12), and one at-risk school
- NCES District ID: 0102580

Students and staff
- Students: 5,377
- Student–teacher ratio: 16.72

Other information
- n]
- Website: www.opelikaschools.org

Opelika City Schools (OCS) is a school district headquartered in Opelika, Alabama. The district is accredited by the Alabama State Department of Education and the Southern Association of Colleges and Schools. The school system enrolls approximately 4,300 students on nine campuses. Opelika has three primary schools with grades K–2, Southview, Jeter, and Carver, three intermediate schools with grades 3–5, West Forest, Northside, and Morris Avenue, Opelika Middle School with grades 6–8, Opelika High School with grades 9–12, and one at-risk school, Opelika Learning Center. Opelika's schools have traditionally had strong programs in technology and the arts.

== Elementary schools ==
All elementary schools have school-wide Title I programs. The curriculum is aligned with the Alabama Courses of Study and is directed by system-wide pacing guides developed by teachers. This consistency allows transient students a greater opportunity for success. The Harcourt program and the Scott Foresman Investigations program provide the basic framework for the reading and math curricula. In addition, teachers use system-wide writing rubrics and administer common assessments throughout the year.

All students in grades PreK-5 receive music and art instruction by teachers in these special areas. The music program also provides all third grade students with nine weeks of violin lessons and encourages selected students to continue these lessons in fourth and fifth grades. An Enrichment Program is provided for students in grades 3-5 through whole group and small group classes.

== Middle school ==
Opelika Middle School (OMS) was selected as a 2010 Alabama CLAS Banner School for its outstanding programs and services for students. In addition, OMS was one of only 11 schools in Alabama presented with the Alabama Safe Schools Award of Excellence in 2008.

Opelika Middle School operates as a true middle school model. Advanced classes are offered on every team in every core subject with inclusion classes also accommodating students with special needs.

The OMS Gateway to Technology program focuses on the STEM Curriculum (Science, Technology, Engineering and Math).

Students at the middle school level have the opportunity to be involved in Band, Chorus, Show choir, Art, a variety of technology based classes and school sports teams. In addition, each day begins with enrichment classes that allow students to participate in targeted math, reading, and project based learning activities. The project based learning activities include financial literacy, structural engineering, cultural investigations, current events, and strategic games where students work collaboratively in problem solving.

With the arts being an integral part of this community, OMS offers an array of fine arts courses. Sixth grade students rotate through introductory fine arts classes of band, chorus and art. Seventh and eighth grade students may choose to participate in the fine arts electives of band and chorus. Physical education classes focus on fitness, health, and basic rules of sports in alignment with the Alabama Course of Study. Sports offered include football, softball, baseball, soccer, wrestling, basketball, volleyball, tennis, golf, track and cross country. Clubs range from 4H to National Junior Honor Society.

== High school ==
Opelika High School was originally built in 1972. In August 2014, a $46 million renovation and construction project was completed. The new building contains 87 new classrooms on two floors including seven computer labs. Each classroom is outfitted with a Promethean interactive whiteboard, projector and ELMO document camera. The business technology labs are outfitted with ClearTouch 70" interactive displays that are fully integrated with new educational software. New classrooms include general classrooms for core classes, science labs, an ACCESS computer lab for distance learning and specialty classrooms for Consumer Science, Health Science, Driver's Education, Art, Special Education, Business Tech, Engineering, Publishing and Horticulture. OHS also features a new cafeteria, kitchen and serving area. Bulldog Stadium now has a turf field, new concession areas, new restrooms and ticket booths. A 22,000 square foot indoor athletic facility including a turf practice field, Varsity locker room, offices and meeting rooms was also built. Renovations were also completed for the OHS baseball field, the Women's athletic facility, and the girls and boys PE areas.

OHS offers classes designed for each student's learning level, from individual assistance to Advanced Placement. Advanced Placement classes are offered in History, Biology, Chemistry, Government, Economics, English Composition, English Literature, Art, Statistics, Physics, and Calculus. Dual enrollment is an option for students to earn both high school and college credits at Southern Union State Community College whose Opelika campus is located directly across the street from the high school. Courses available for dual enrollment include Pre-Calculus, Calculus and US History 1.

Career Technical classes prepare students for immediate transition following graduation into the workplace or articulated courses offered at Southern Union and other community colleges. Programs include horticulture, business information technology, family and consumer science, engineering, and health science. The annual horticulture department plant sale raises thousands of dollars for scholarships and program expenses.

== Schools ==
Secondary schools

- Opelika High School
- Opelika Middle School
- Fox Run School

Primary schools

- Morris Avenue Intermediate School
- Northside Intermediate School
- West Forest Intermediate School
- Carver Primary School
- Jeter Primary School
- Southview Primary School

== Gallery ==
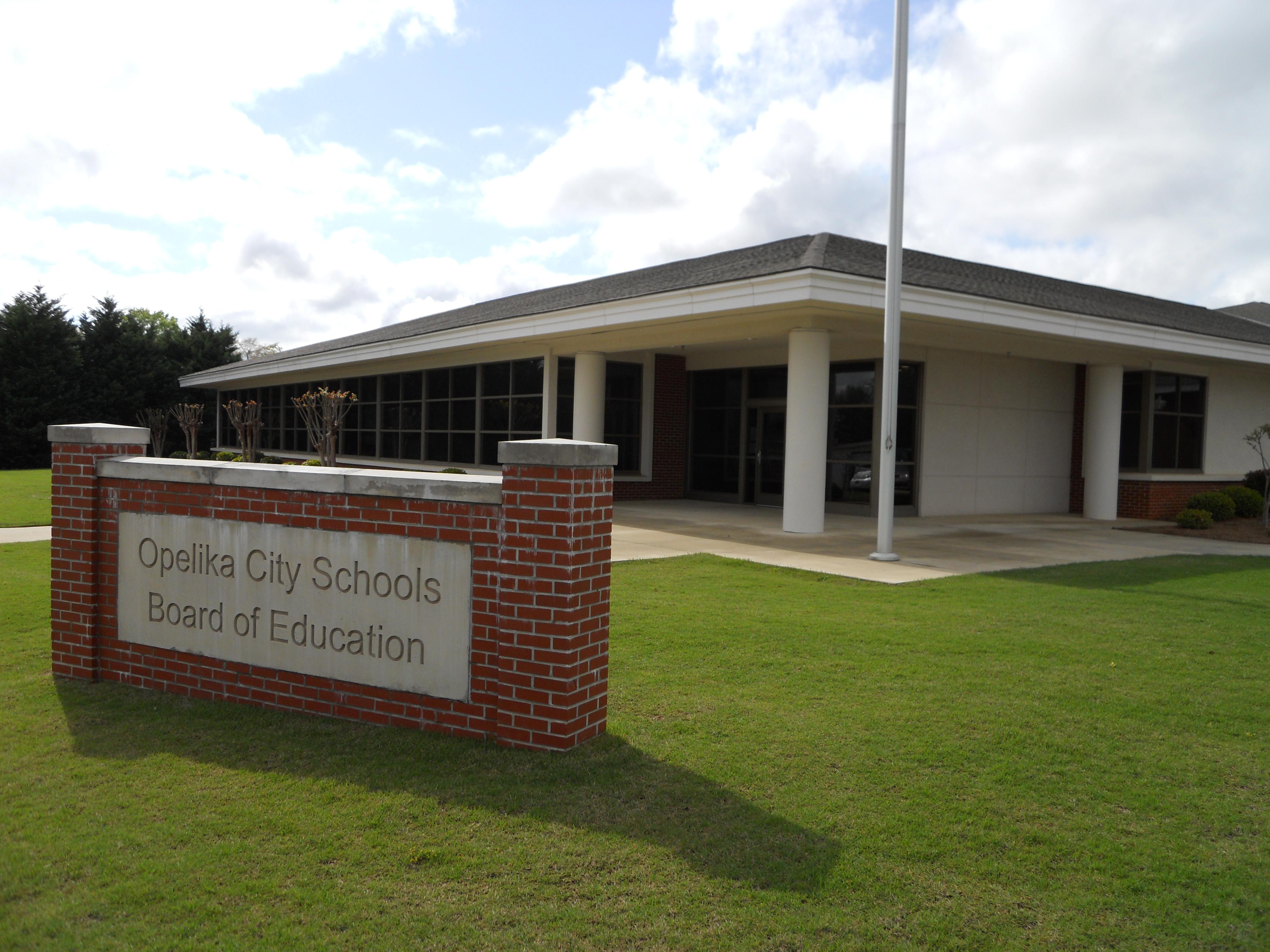
Opelika City Schools Board of Education

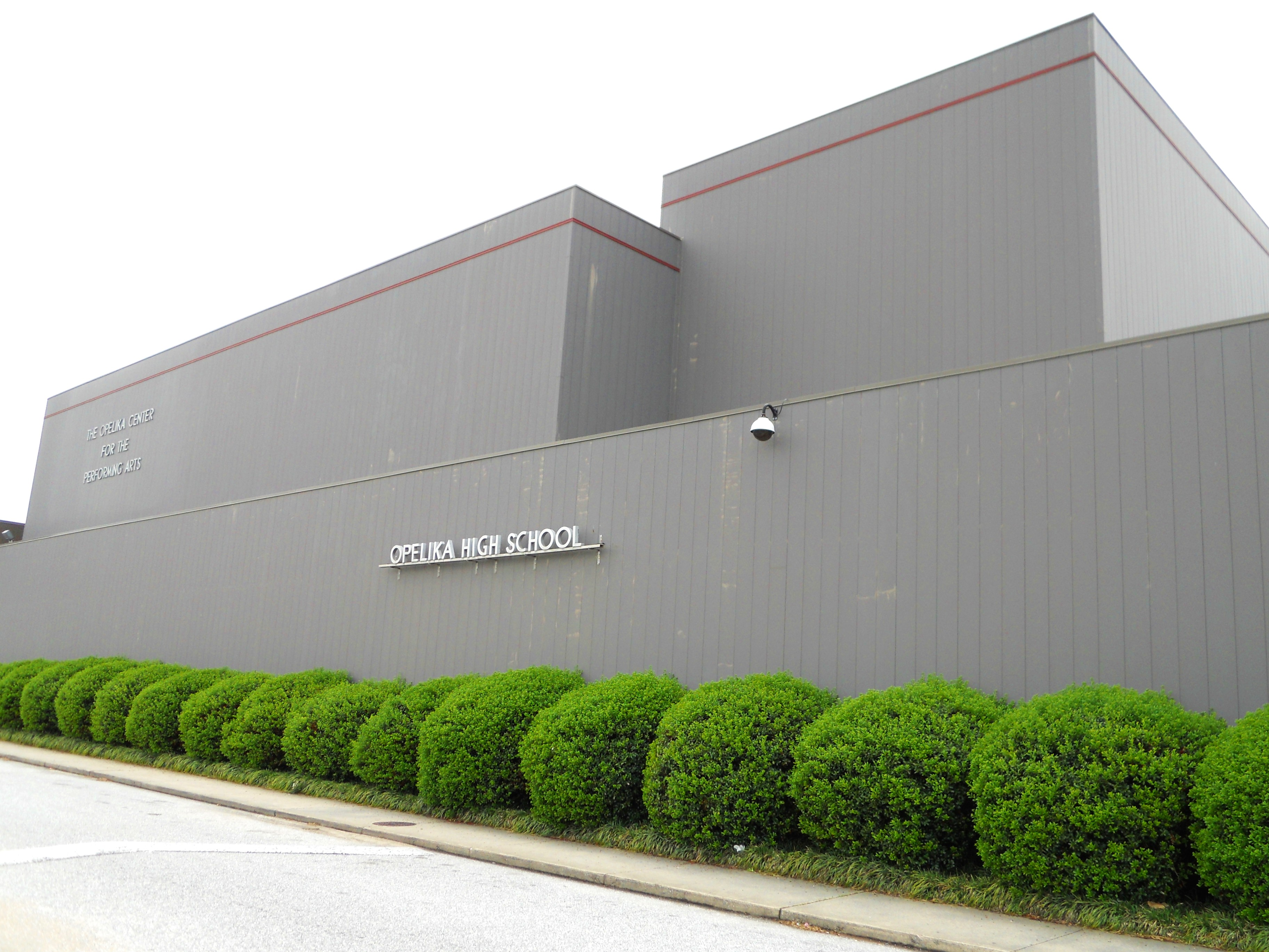
Opelika High School

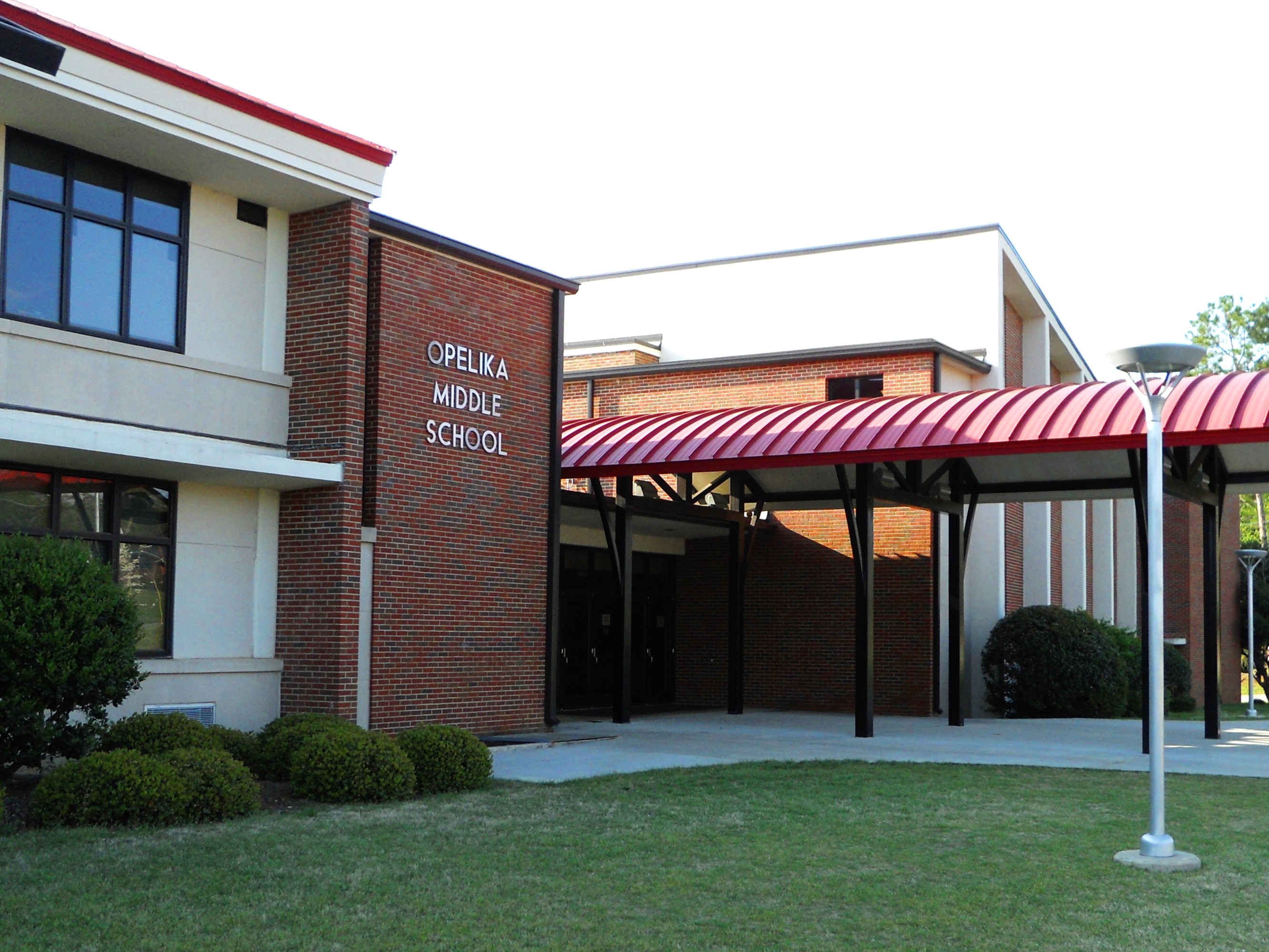
Opelika Middle School

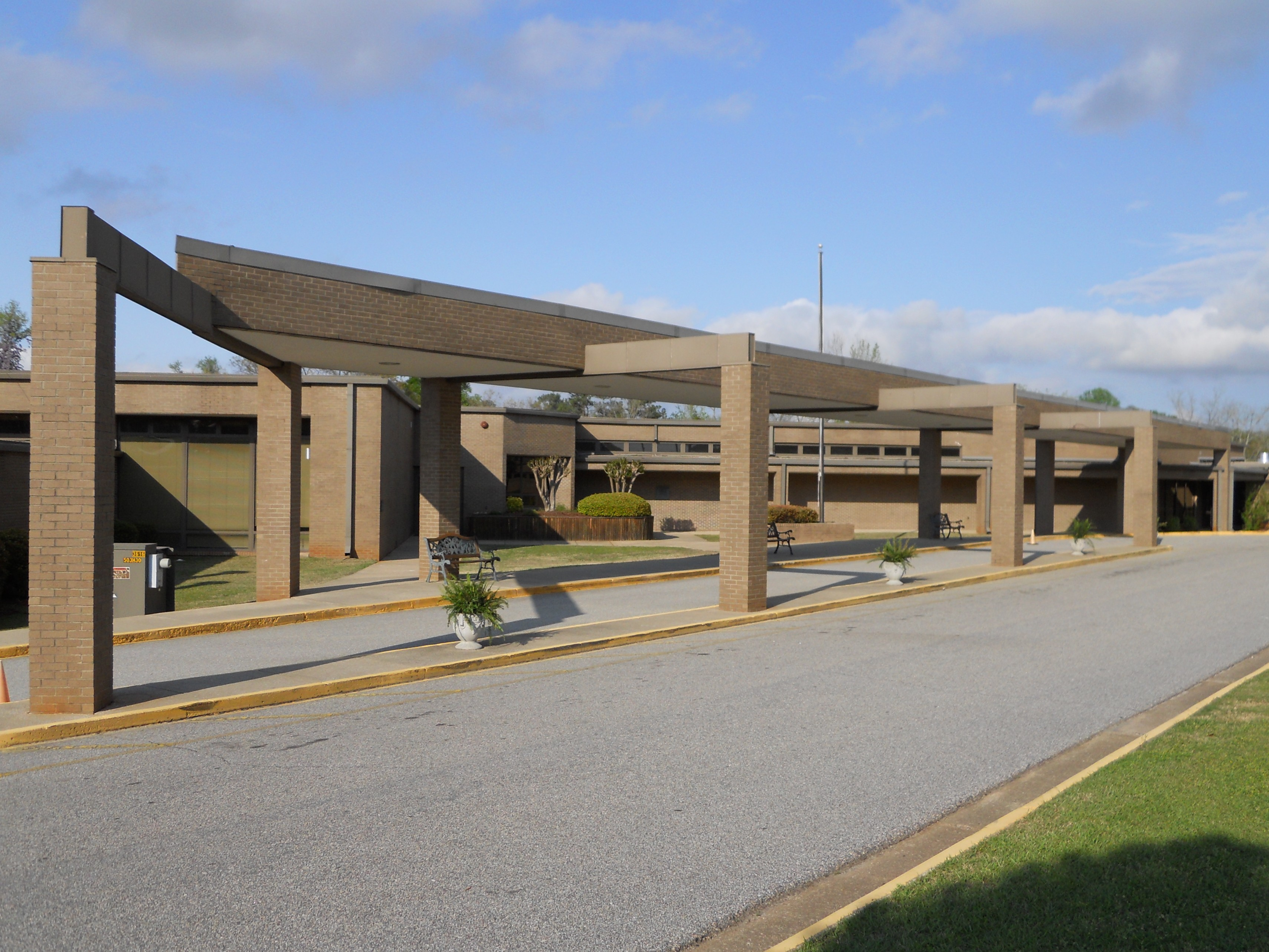
Morris Avenue Intermediate School

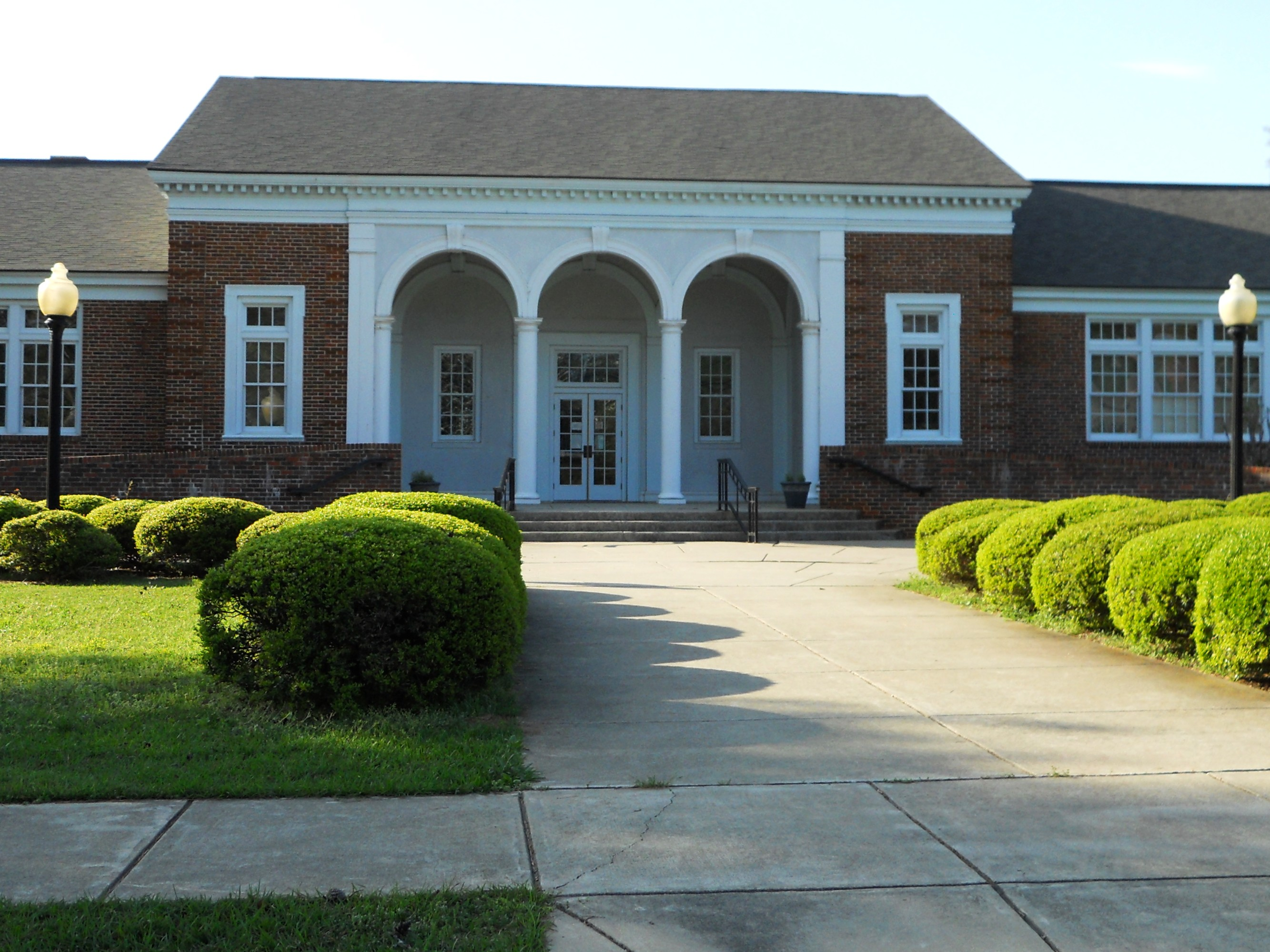
Northside Intermediate School

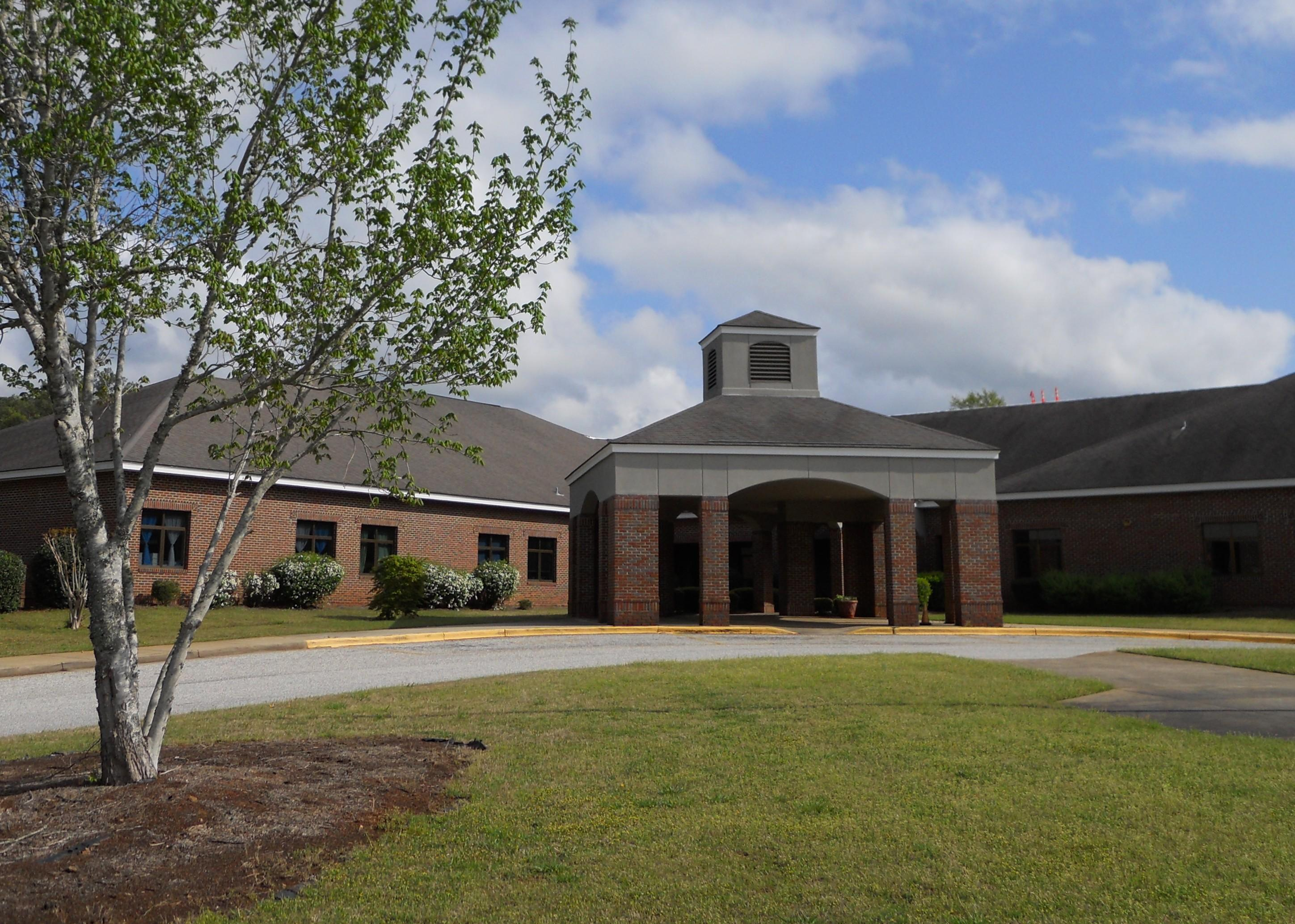
West Forest Intermediate School

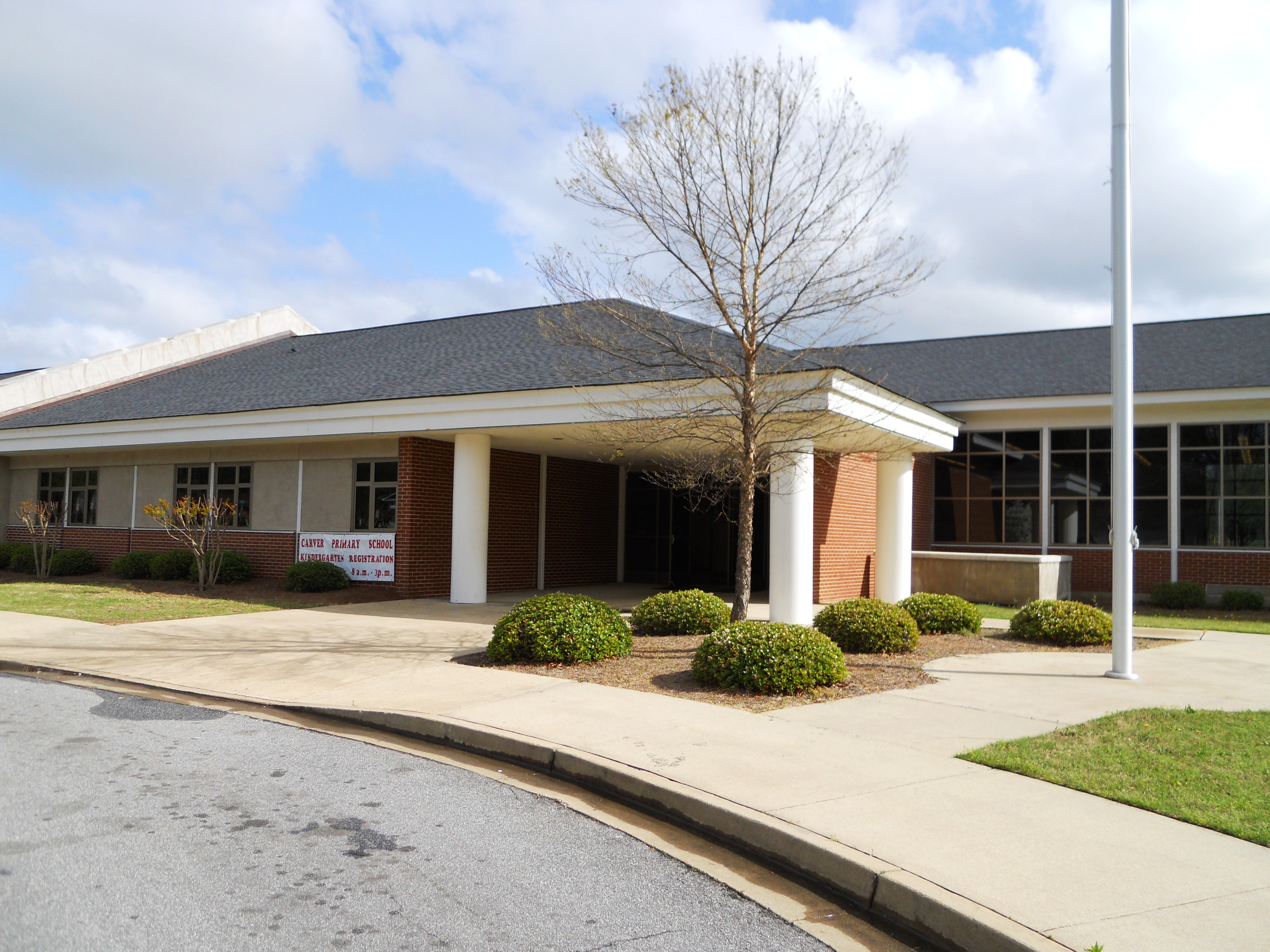
Carver Primary School

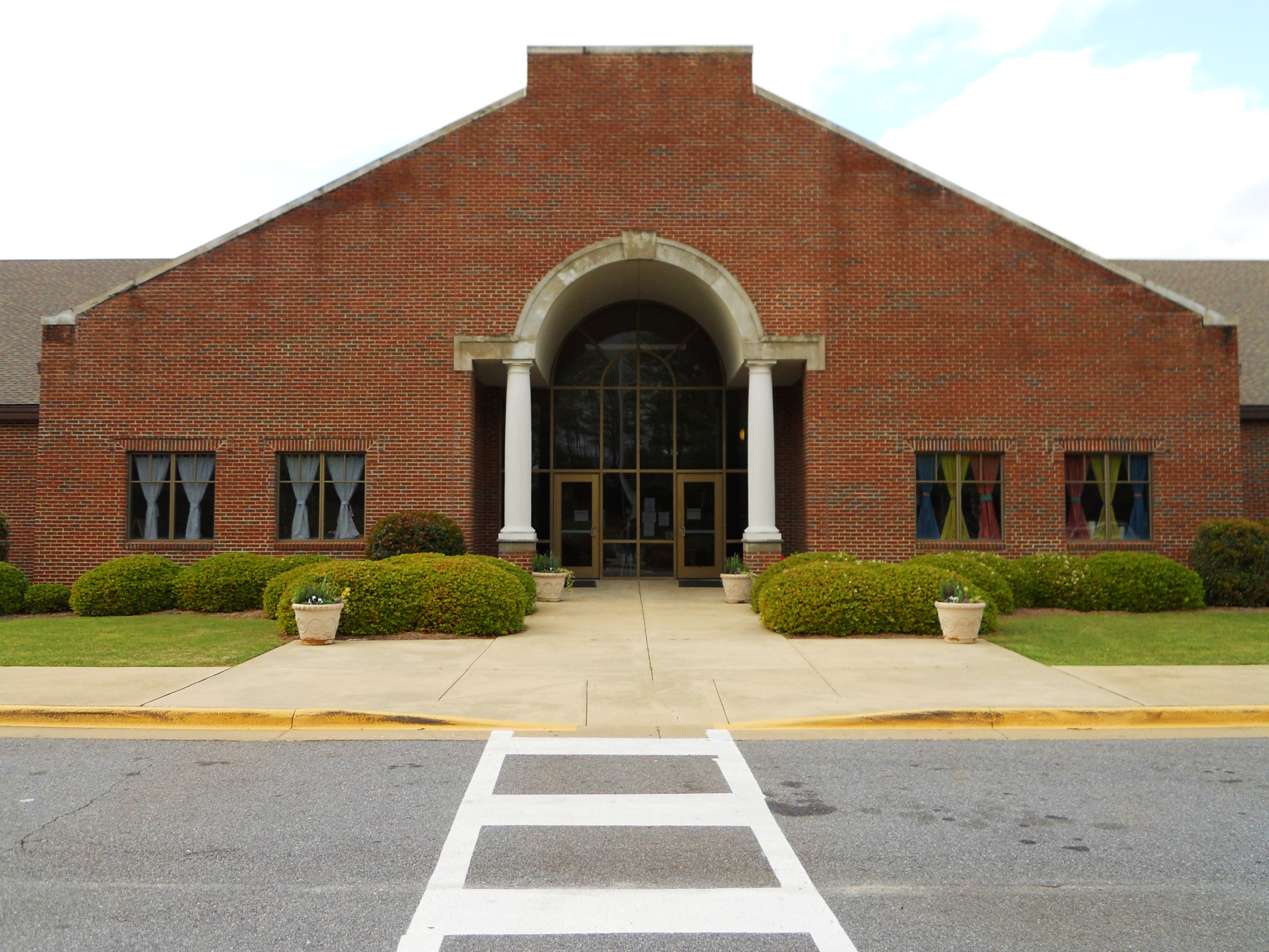
Jeter Primary School

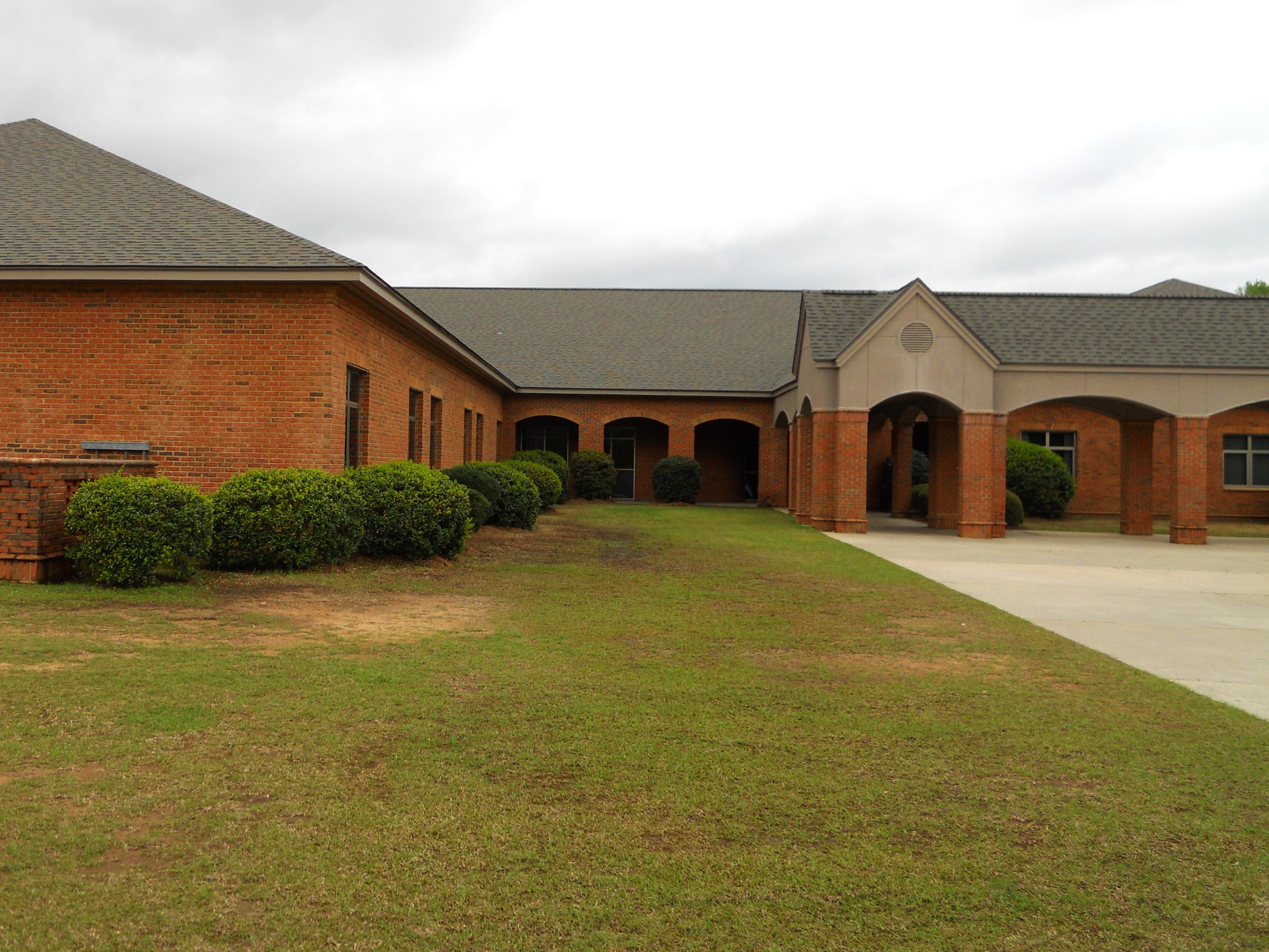
Southview Primary School
