= List of radio stations in Georgia (U.S. state) =

The following is a list of FCC-licensed radio stations in the United States state of Georgia, which can be sorted by their call signs, frequencies, cities of license, licensees, and programming formats.

== List of radio stations ==
| Call sign | Frequency | City of license | Licensee | Format |
|---|---|---|---|---|
| WBWK-LP | 95.7 FM | Brunswick | Brunswick Community Radio, Inc. | |
| WAAC | 92.9 FM | Valdosta | W.G.O.V., Inc. | Country |
| WAAK-LP | 94.7 FM | Boynton | Boynton Educational Radio, Inc. | Variety |
| WABE | 90.1 FM | Atlanta | Board of Education, City of Atlanta/ WABE | Public radio (NPR) |
| WABR | 91.1 FM | Tifton | Georgia Public Telecommunications Commission | Public radio |
| WACG-FM | 90.7 FM | Augusta | Georgia Public Telecommunications Commission | Public radio |
| WAEC | 860 AM | Atlanta | Beasley Media Group, LLC | Spanish-language salsa |
| WAEF | 90.3 FM | Cordele | American Family Association | Christian (AFR) |
| WAEG | 92.3 FM | Evans | Perry Broadcasting of Augusta, Inc. | Smooth jazz |
| WAEV | 97.3 FM | Savannah | iHM Licenses, LLC | Top 40 (CHR) |
| WAFS | 1190 AM | Atlanta | Relevant Radio, Inc. | Catholic |
| WAFT | 101.1 FM | Valdosta | Christian Radio Fellowship, Inc. | Christian |
| WAIA | 104.7 FM | Athens | Educational Media Foundation | Worship Music (Air1) |
| WAJQ-FM | 104.3 FM | Alma | Blueberry Broadcasting Company, Inc. | Classic country |
| WAKB | 100.9 FM | Hephzibah | Perry Broadcasting of Augusta, Inc. | Urban adult contemporary |
| WAKL | 106.7 FM | Gainesville | Educational Media Foundation | Contemporary Christian (K-Love) |
| WAKP | 89.1 FM | Smithboro | Friends In Need Foundation Inc. | Christian (American Family Radio) |
| WALG | 1590 AM | Albany | First Media Services, LLC | News/Talk |
| WALR-FM | 104.1 FM | Palmetto | Cox Radio, LLC | Urban adult contemporary |
| WAMJ | 107.5 FM | Roswell | Radio One Licenses, LLC | Urban adult contemporary |
| WAOK | 1380 AM | Atlanta | Audacy License, LLC | News/Talk |
| WAOO-LP | 94.5 FM | Suwanee | Casa Vida Inc. | Spanish religious |
| WAOS | 1600 AM | Austell | La Favorita, Inc. | Regional Mexican |
| WAQA-LP | 94.5 FM | Morganton | Ministry of Faith Association | Religious |
| WASU-LP | 92.7 FM | Albany | Albany State University | R&B/Jazz |
| WASW | 91.9 FM | Waycross | American Family Association | Christian (AFR) |
| WATB-LP | 101.9 FM | Atlanta | New Times Culture and Education Center | Ethnic/Chinese |
| WATY | 91.3 FM | Folkston | Delmarva Educational Association | Public radio |
| WAWH | 88.3 FM | Dublin | American Family Association | Religious talk (AFR) |
| WAWO | 1400 AM | Alma | Blueberry Broadcasting Company, Inc. | Catholic |
| WAWS | 107.3 FM | Claxton | Educational Media Foundation | Contemporary Christian (Air 1) |
| WAYR-FM | 90.7 FM | Brunswick | Good Tidings Trust, Inc | Christian adult contemporary |
| WAYT | 88.1 FM | Thomasville | Hope Media Group | Contemporary Christian |
| WAYX | 1230 AM | Waycross | Satilla Broadcast Properties, LLC | Sports |
| WAZX | 1550 AM | Smyrna | Intelli LLC | Spanish Christian |
| WAZX-FM | 101.9 FM | Cleveland | WAZX-FM, Inc | Regional Mexican |
| WBAF | 1090 AM | Barnesville | Ploener Radio Group of Barnesville, LLC | Classic hits |
| WBBK-FM | 93.1 FM | Blakely | Alabama Media, LLC | Urban adult contemporary |
| WBBQ-FM | 104.3 FM | Augusta | iHM Licenses, LLC | Adult contemporary |
| WBBT | 1340 AM | Lyons | T.C.B. Broadcasting, Inc | Oldies |
| WBCX | 89.1 FM | Gainesville | Brenau College | Variety |
| WBDX | 102.7 FM | Trenton | Partners For Christian Media, Inc. | Contemporary Christian |
| WBFC-LP | 107.5 FM | Boynton | Boynton Low Power Broadcasting, Inc. | Southern gospel |
| WBGA | 1490 AM | Brunswick | iHM Licenses, LLC | Urban contemporary |
| WBGE | 101.9 FM | Bainbridge | Flint Media, Inc. | Hot adult contemporary |
| WBGP | 91.3 FM | Moultrie | Faith Radio Network, Inc. | Christian |
| WBHF | 1450 AM | Cartersville | Anverse, Inc. | News/Talk/Sports Adult standards |
| WBHS-LP | 104.9 FM | Brunswick | Glynn County, Georgia | Talk |
| WBIB-FM | 89.1 FM | Forsyth | Believers in Broadcasting, Inc. | Christian |
| WBIN | 640 AM | Atlanta | iHM Licenses, LLC | News (BIN) |
| WBJY | 89.3 FM | Americus | American Family Association | Inspirational (AFR) |
| WBKG | 88.9 FM | Macon | American Family Association | Religious Talk (AFR) |
| WBLJ | 1230 AM | Dalton | North Georgia Radio Group, L.P. | News/Talk |
| WBLY-LP | 101.5 FM | Sycamore | Bethel Baptist Church of Sycamore, Georgia, | Southern gospel |
| WBML | 1350 AM | Warner Robins | WRWR-AM Radio LLC | Classic hits |
| WBMQ | 103.7 FM | Metter | RadioJones, LLC | Classic hits |
| WBMZ | 1360 AM | Metter | RadioJones, LLC | Southern gospel |
| WBOJ | 1270 AM | Columbus | 88.5 The Truth, Inc. | Classic hits |
| WBQO | 93.7 FM | Darien | QBS Broadcasting, LLC | Adult album alternative |
| WBTR-FM | 92.1 FM | Carrollton | WYAI, Inc. | Country |
| WBTY | 98.7 FM | Homerville | Southern Broadcasting & Investment Co., Inc. | Classic hits |
| WBYZ | 94.5 FM | Baxley | South Georgia Broadcasters, Inc. | Country |
| WBZW | 96.7 FM | Union City | iHM Licenses, LLC | Regional Mexican |
| WBZY | 105.7 FM | Canton | iHM Licenses, LLC | Spanish contemporary |
| WCCV | 91.7 FM | Cartersville | Immanuel Broadcasting Network | Contemporary Christian |
| WCDG | 88.7 FM | Dahlonega | Legacy Broadcasting, Inc. | Christian talk |
| WCEH | 610 AM | Hawkinsville | | Variety |
| WCEH-FM | 98.3 FM | Pinehurst | Shanks Broadcasting, LLC | Sports (ESPN) |
| WCFO | 1160 AM | East Point | Atlanta Catholic Radio, Inc. | Catholic |
| WCGA | 1100 AM | Woodbine | Cox Broadcast Group, Inc. | News/Talk |
| WCGQ | 107.3 FM | Columbus | PMB Broadcasting, LLC | Top 40 (CHR) |
| WCHK | 1290 AM | Canton | Davis Broadcasting of Atlanta, L.L.C. | Latin Pop |
| WCHM | 1490 AM | Clarkesville | WCHM Radio, LLC | News/Talk |
| WCHS-LP | 102.7 FM | Sylvester | Worth County High School | Variety |
| WCJM-FM | 100.9 FM | West Point | iHM Licenses, LLC | Country |
| WCLA | 1470 AM | Claxton | W. Danny Swain | Adult standards |
| WCLK | 91.9 FM | Atlanta | Clark Atlanta University | Jazz |
| WCNN | 680 AM | North Atlanta | Dickey Broadcasting Company | Sports (ESPN) |
| WCON | 1450 AM | Cornelia | Habersham Broadcasting Company | Soft adult contemporary |
| WCON-FM | 99.3 FM | Cornelia | Habersham Broadcasting Co. | Classic country |
| WCUG | 88.5 FM | Lumpkin | 88.5 the Truth, Inc. | Jazz, News, Sports and College |
| WDAK | 540 AM | Columbus | iHM Licenses, LLC | News/Talk |
| WDAL | 1430 AM | Dalton | North Georgia Radio Group, L.P. | Classic hits |
| WDBG | 103.1 FM | Dexter | RadioJones, LLC | Classic hits |
| WDBN | 107.9 FM | Wrightsville | Dowdy Partners | Urban contemporary |
| WDCY | 1520 AM | Douglasville | Word Christian Broadcasting Inc. | Gospel |
| WDDK | 103.9 FM | Greensboro | Wyche Services Corporation | Oldies/Conservative talk |
| WDDO | 980 AM | Perry | The Glory Media Group, LLC | Gospel |
| WDDQ | 92.1 FM | Adel | Smalltown Broadcasting, LLC | Talk |
| WDEC-FM | 94.7 FM | Americus | Sumter Broadcasting Co., Inc. | Hot adult contemporary |
| WDEN-FM | 99.1 FM | Macon | Cumulus Licensing LLC | Country |
| WDJY-LP | 99.1 FM | Dallas | Hype Media Global Inc | Talk |
| WDMG | 860 AM | Douglas | Broadcast South, LLC | Spanish |
| WDMG-FM | 97.9 FM | Ambrose | Broadcast South, LLC | Hot adult contemporary |
| WDPC | 1500 AM | Dallas | Word Christian Broadcasting, Inc. | Gospel |
| WDRR | 93.9 FM | Martinez | Beasley Media Group, LLC | Classic hits |
| WDRW-LP | 107.9 FM | Athens | Christian Pursuers' Radio, Inc. | Religious |
| WDUN | 550 AM | Gainesville | Jacobs Media Corporation | News/Talk |
| WDUN-FM | 102.9 FM | Clarkesville | Jacobs Media Corporation | Talk |
| WDWD | 590 AM | Atlanta | Salem Communications Holding Corporation | Christian talk |
| WDXQ | 1440 AM | Cochran | | Regional Mexican |
| WDYN | 980 AM | Rossville | Piedmont International University, Inc. | Christian |
| WEAM-FM | 100.7 FM | Buena Vista | Davis Broadcasting Inc., of Columbus | Gospel |
| WEAS-FM | 93.1 FM | Springfield | Cumulus Licensing LLC | Mainstream urban |
| WEBS | 1030 AM | Calhoun | James R. Powell | Silent |
| WECC-FM | 89.3 FM | Folkston | Lighthouse Christian Broadcasting Corp. | Contemporary Christian |
| WEDB | 98.1 FM | East Dublin | Radiojones, LLC | Hot adult contemporary |
| WEGG | 95.3 FM | Bowman | Lake Hartwell Radio, Inc. | Oldies |
| WEKL | 102.3 FM | Augusta | Educational Media Foundation | Contemporary Christian (K-Love) |
| WEKS | 92.5 FM | Zebulon | Legacy Media – South Atlanta, LLC | Country |
| WESI-LP | 92.3 FM | Sugarhill | Iglesia de Cristo Elim Georgia, Inc. | Spanish religious |
| WEWZ-LP | 103.9 FM | Waycross | Crossway Broadcasting | Soul/R&B |
| WEYY | 88.7 FM | Tallapoosa | Barnes Evangelistic Ministries | Christian |
| WEZO | 1230 AM | Augusta | MSbuttoni, LLC | Urban adult contemporary |
| WFAG-LP | 103.7 FM | Valdosta | Valdosta Alliance Inc | |
| WFAL | 105.9 FM | Milner | Augusta Radio Fellowship Institute, Inc. | Christian (GNNradio) |
| WFAM | 1050 AM | Augusta | J.J. & B. Broadcasting, Inc. | Christian |
| WFDR | 1370 AM | Manchester | Ploener Radio Group, LLC | Classic hits |
| WFDR-FM | 94.5 FM | Woodbury | Ploener Radio Group, LLC | Urban contemporary |
| WFFM | 105.7 FM | Ashburn | Journey Church of Tifton, Inc. | Silent |
| WFNS | 1350 AM | Blackshear | Southern Media Interactive LLC | Silent |
| WFOM | 1230 AM | Marietta | Dickey Broadcasting Company | News/Talk |
| WFSL | 90.7 FM | Thomasville | Florida State University Board of Trustees | Classical |
| WFTD | 1080 AM | Marietta | Prieto Enterprises, Inc. | Variety |
| WFVS-FM | 96.9 FM | Reynolds | Bd. Regents, U. Syst. of GA dba Fort Valley State University | College/Modern AC/Top 40 (CHR) |
| WFXA-FM | 103.1 FM | Augusta | Perry Broadcasting of Augusta, Inc. | Mainstream urban |
| WFXE | 104.9 FM | Columbus | Davis Broadcasting, Inc. of Columbus | Mainstream urban |
| WFXM | 107.1 FM | Gordon | WFXM-FM Radio, LLC | Mainstream urban |
| WGAA | 1340 AM | Cedartown | Burgess Broadcasting Corporation | Classic hits |
| WGAC | 580 AM | Augusta | Beasley Media Group, LLC | News/Talk |
| WGAC-FM | 95.1 FM | Harlem | WCHZ License, LLC | News/Talk |
| WGAF-LP | 102.1 FM | Fayetteville | Rock 10 4 U, Inc. | Urban Gospel |
| WGAU | 1340 AM | Athens | Cox Radio, LLC | News/Talk |
| WGCO | 98.3 FM | Midway | Dick Broadcasting Company, Inc. of Tennessee | Top 40 (CHR) |
| WGEX | 97.3 FM | Bainbridge | iHM Licenses, LLC | Top 40 (CHR) |
| WGGA | 1240 AM | Gainesville | Jacobs Media Corporation | Adult contemporary |
| WGIG | 1440 AM | Brunswick | Qantum of Brunswick License Company, LLC | News/Talk |
| WGJK | 1360 AM | Rome | Woman's World | Country |
| WGKA | 920 AM | Atlanta | Caron Broadcasting, Inc. | Talk |
| WGLA | 90.5 FM | Nashville | Educational Media Foundation | Spanish religious (Radio Nueva Vida) |
| WGLH | 103.9 FM | Hawkinsville | Educational Media Foundation | Contemporary Christian (K-Love) |
| WGLU | 102.5 FM | Warner Robins | Educational Media Foundation | Contemporary Christian (K-Love) |
| WGMG | 102.1 FM | Crawford | Cox Radio, LLC | Adult contemporary |
| WGMK | 106.3 FM | Donalsonville | Flint Media, Inc. | Classic rock |
| WGMY | 107.1 FM | Thomasville | iHM Licenses, LLC | Top 40 (CHR) |
| WGOV-FM | 96.7 FM | Valdosta | W.G.O.V., Inc. | Mainstream urban |
| WGPB | 97.7 FM | Rome | Georgia Public Telecommunications Commission | Public Broadcasting |
| WGPH | 91.5 FM | Vidalia | Augusta Radio Fellowship Institute, Inc | Christian (Good News Network) |
| WGRA | 790 AM | Cairo | Lovett Broadcasting Enterprises, Inc | Talk |
| WGRU-LP | 99.1 FM | Riverdale | Minority Voices Speak | Variety |
| WGST | 720 AM | Hogansville | iHM Licenses, LLC | News/Talk |
| WGSW | 106.9 FM | Americus | Greater 2nd Mt. Olive Missionary Baptist Church | Urban contemporary gospel |
| WGTJ | 1330 AM | Murrayville | Vision Communications of Georgia, Inc. | Christian |
| WGUN | 950 AM | Valdosta | W.G.O.V., Inc. | Urban adult contemporary |
| WGUR | 95.3 FM | Milledgeville | Georgia College & State University | College/variety |
| WHCJ | 90.3 FM | Savannah | Savannah State University | Non-commercial educational FM |
| WHFX | 107.7 FM | Darien | iHM Licenses, LLC | Mainstream rock |
| WHHR | 92.1 FM | Vienna | Radio by Grace, Inc. | Christian |
| WHIE | 1320 AM | Griffin | Chappell Communications, LLC | Defunct |
| WHJD | 920 AM | Hazlehurst | Broadcast South, LLC | Classic hits |
| WHJU-LP | 102.1 FM | Conyers | Rockdale Community Broadcasting Inc | Religious Teaching |
| WHKV | 106.1 FM | Sylvester | Educational Media Foundation | Contemporary Christian (K-Love) |
| WHLB-LP | 104.9 FM | Cartersville | House of Liberty Ministries, Inc. | Religious |
| WHLJ | 1400 AM | Moultrie | LaTaurus Productions Two, LLC | Christian |
| WHLJ-FM | 97.5 FM | Statenville | La Taurus Productions Inc. | Urban adult contemporary |
| WHNL-LP | 94.9 FM | Hinesville | Liberty Prayer Chapel, Inc. | Urban gospel |
| WHTA | 107.9 FM | Hampton | Radio One Licenses, LLC | Urban contemporary |
| WIBB-FM | 97.9 FM | Fort Valley | iHM Licenses, LLC | Mainstream urban |
| WIEH-LP | 99.1 FM | Marietta | Semeadores de Boas Novas, Inc. | Brazilian Christian |
| WIFN | 1340 AM | Atlanta | Dickey Broadcasting Company | Sports (ESPN) |
| WIFO-FM | 105.5 FM | Jesup | Jesup Broadcasting Corp. | Country |
| WIGO | 1570 AM | Morrow | MCL/MCM Georgia, LLC | Urban adult contemporary |
| WIHB | 1280 AM | Macon | iHM Licenses, LLC | Classic country |
| WIHB-FM | 96.5 FM | Gray | iHM Licenses, LLC | Country |
| WIOL | 1580 AM | Columbus | Davis Broadcasting, Inc. of Columbus | Top 40 (CHR) |
| WIOL-FM | 95.7 FM | Waverly Hall | Davis Broadcasting, Inc. of Columbus | Sports (ESPN) |
| WIPK | 94.5 FM | Calhoun | Core Communicators North LLC | Top 40 (CHR) |
| WISK | 990 AM | Lawrenceville | Sumter Broadcasting Co., Inc. | Country |
| WISK-FM | 98.7 FM | Americus | Sumter Broadcasting Co., Inc. | Country |
| WIXV | 95.5 FM | Savannah | Cumulus Licensing LLC | Classic rock |
| WJAD | 103.5 FM | Leesburg | First Media Services, LLC | Mainstream rock |
| WJAT | 800 AM | Swainsboro | Radiojones, LLC | News/Talk |
| WJBB | 1300 AM | Winder | Barrow Radio Broadcasting LLC | Talk |
| WJCF-LP | 102.7 FM | Doerun | First Baptist Church of Doerun | Religious Teaching |
| WJCL-FM | 96.5 FM | Savannah | Cumulus Licensing LLC | Country |
| WJDS | 88.7 FM | Sparta | Augusta Radio Fellowship Institute, Inc | Christian (Good News Network) |
| WJEM | 1150 AM | Valdosta | Smalltown Broadcasting, LLC | Sports (FSR) |
| WJEP | 91.1 FM | Cusseta | Radio by Grace, Inc. | Christian |
| WJES | 100.9 FM | Maysville | Nelson Rodriguez | Spanish Christian |
| WJFL | 101.9 FM | Tennille | Middle Georgia Broadcasting, Inc. | Adult contemporary |
| WJGA-FM | 92.1 FM | Jackson | Earnhart Broadcasting Co., Inc. | Classic hits |
| WJGG-LP | 98.3 FM | Thomasville | Calvary Chapel of Thomasville | Religious |
| WJIZ-FM | 96.3 FM | Albany | iHM Licenses, LLC | Urban contemporary |
| WJJC | 1270 AM | Commerce | Side Communications, Inc. | Country |
| WJPV-LP | 107.9 FM | Gainesville | John Paul II Training Center for the New Evangelization, Inc. | Religious Teaching |
| WJRB | 95.1 FM | Young Harris | WJRB Radio, LLC | News/Talk |
| WJRP-LP | 107.7 FM | Calhoun | Calhoun Community Radio Inc. | Contemporary Christian |
| WJSP-FM | 88.1 FM | Warm Springs | Georgia Public Telecommunications Commission | Public radio |
| WJST | 102.1 FM | Sylvester | JetStream Media LLC | Classic hits |
| WJTG | 91.3 FM | Fort Valley | Family Life Broadcasting, Inc. | Religious (Family Life Radio) |
| WJTH | 900 AM | Calhoun | Cherokee Broadcasting Company | Country |
| WJTR-LP | 102.7 FM | Ashburn | Turner County Council For Community Education | Religious |
| WJUL | 1230 AM | Hiawassee | WJUL Radio, LLC | News/Talk |
| WJWV | 90.9 FM | Fort Gaines | Georgia Public Telecommunications Commission | Public radio |
| WJYI | 103.1 FM | Tifton | Abraham Baldwin Agricultural College | Variety |
| WJYZ | 960 AM | Albany | iHM Licenses, LLC | Gospel |
| WJZA | 1100 AM | Hapeville | Davis Broadcasting of Atlanta, LLC | Smooth jazz |
| WKAA | 99.5 FM | Willacoochee | RTG Radio, LLC, Debtor-in-Possession | Country |
| WKAK | 104.5 FM | Albany | First Media Services, LLC | Country |
| WKBX | 106.3 FM | Kingsland | Radio Kings Bay, Inc. | Country |
| WKCN | 99.3 FM | Fort Benning South | PMB Broadcasting, LLC | Country |
| WKEU | 1450 AM | Griffin | WLT & Associates | Oldies |
| WKEU-FM | 88.9 FM | The Rock | Georgia Public Radio, Inc. | Classic rock |
| WKHX-FM | 101.5 FM | Marietta | Radio License Holdings LLC | Country |
| WKIH | 90.3 FM | Twin City | Radio By Grace, Inc. | Southern gospel |
| WKKP | 1410 AM | McDonough | Henry County Radio Co., Inc. | Classic country |
| WKKZ | 92.7 FM | Dublin | Kirby Broadcasting Company | Modern adult contemporary |
| WKLD-LP | 92.7 FM | Bainbridge | Community Helping Hand Outreach, Inc | Classic R&B |
| WKLY | 980 AM | Hartwell | Bryan Hicks & Bruce Hicks, Partners dba WKLY Broadcasting Company | Country |
| WKMP-LP | 90.9 FM | Eastman | Keep It Moving Ministries, Inc. | Religious Teaching |
| WKMW | 88.7 FM | Americus | Educational Media Foundation | Contemporary Christian (K-Love) |
| WKNG | 1060 AM | Tallapoosa | WKNG, LLC | Classic country |
| WKTF | 1550 AM | Vienna | Hammett Financial Management Corporation | Contemporary Christian |
| WKTM | 106.1 FM | Soperton | Augusta Radio Fellowship Institute, Inc. | Christian (Good News Network) |
| WKUB | 105.1 FM | Blackshear | Higgs Multimedia Group, LLC | Country |
| WKUN | 1490 AM | Monroe | B.R. Anderson | Gospel |
| WKVQ | 1540 AM | Eatonton | Rev Leonard Small | Christian |
| WKWN | 1420 AM | Trenton | Dade County Broadcasting, Inc. | News/Talk |
| WKZR | 102.3 FM | Milledgeville | Oconee Communications Company, LLC | Country |
| WKZV | 102.1 FM | Tybee Island | Educational Media Foundation | Contemporary Christian (K-Love) |
| WKZZ | 92.5 FM | Tifton | Broadcast South, LLC | Country |
| WLAG | 1240 AM | La Grange | Eagle's Nest, Inc | Sports (ISN) |
| WLAQ | 1410 AM | Rome | Cripple Creek Broadcasting Company | News |
| WLBA | 1130 AM | Gainesville | La Favorita, Inc. | Regional Mexican |
| WLBB | 1330 AM | Carrollton | WYAI, Inc. | News/Talk |
| WLCZ | 98.7 FM | Lincolnton | Glory Communications, Inc. | Gospel/Inspirational |
| WLEL | 94.3 FM | Ellaville | Gorilla Broadcasting ATL LLC | Regional Mexican |
| WLFH | 88.9 FM | Claxton | Radio Training Network, Inc. | Religious (HIS Radio) |
| WLFS | 91.9 FM | Port Wentworth | Radio Training Network, Inc. | Religious (HIS Radio) |
| WLGA | 90.5 FM | Columbus | Educational Media Foundation | Religious (K-Love) |
| WLHR-FM | 92.1 FM | Lavonia | Lake Hartwell Radio Inc | Contemporary & Classic country |
| WLJA-FM | 101.1 FM | Ellijay | Tri-State Communications, Inc. | Classic country/Southern gospel |
| WLKQ-FM | 102.3 FM | Buford | Davis Broadcasting of Atlanta, L.L.C. | Regional Mexican |
| WLOJ-LP | 102.9 FM | Calhoun | Georgia-Cumberland Association | Christian |
| WLOP | 1370 AM | Jesup | Jesup Broadcasting Corp. | Sports (FSR) |
| WLOV | 1370 AM | Washington | Southern Broadcasting Companies, Inc. | Classic hits |
| WLPE | 91.7 FM | Augusta | Augusta Radio Fellowship Institute, Inc | Christian (Good News Network) |
| WLPF | 98.5 FM | Ocilla | Augusta Radio Fellowship Institute, Inc. | Christian (Good News Network) |
| WLPT | 88.3 FM | Jesup | Augusta Radio Fellowship Institute, Inc. | Christian |
| WLRR | 100.7 FM | Milledgeville | Starstation Radio, LLC | Adult standards/MOR |
| WLTA | 1400 AM | Alpharetta | Salem Communications Holding Corporation | Christian talk |
| WLTC | 103.7 FM | Cusseta | PMB Broadcasting, LLC | Adult contemporary |
| WLUB | 105.7 FM | Augusta | iHM Licenses, LLC | Country |
| WLVG | 105.1 FM | Clermont | Educational Media Foundation | Contemporary Christian (K-Love) |
| WLXF | 105.5 FM | Macon | Educational Media Foundation | Contemporary Christian (K-Love) |
| WLXP | 88.1 FM | Savannah | Christian Multimedia Network, Inc. | Worship music (Air1) |
| WLYG | 88.3 FM | Jasper | Joy Christian Ministries | Christian |
| WLYU | 100.9 FM | Lyons | T.C.B. Broadcasting Inc | Country |
| WLZN | 92.3 FM | Macon | Cumulus Licensing LLC | Urban contemporary |
| WMAC | 940 AM | Macon | Cumulus Licensing LLC | News-Talk |
| WMCD | 106.5 FM | Rocky Ford | Radio Statesboro, Inc. | Country |
| WMCG | 104.9 FM | Milan | Tel-Dodge Broadcasting Co. | Classic country |
| WMCZ-LP | 94.5 FM | Camilla | Mitchell Co High School | Variety |
| WMDG | 1260 AM | East Point | Georgia Radio Alliance Atlanta, LLC | News/Talk |
| WMFJ-LP | 97.3 FM | Augusta | Centro Cristiano Oasis de Bendicion, Inc. | Spanish Religious |
| WMGB | 95.1 FM | Montezuma | Cumulus Licensing LLC | Top 40 (CHR) |
| WMGE | 1670 AM | Dry Branch | iHM Licenses, LLC | Black-oriented news (BIN) |
| WMGP | 98.1 FM | Hogansville | iHM Licenses, LLC | Classic hits |
| WMGR | 930 AM | Bainbridge | Flint Media Inc. | Contemporary Christian |
| WMGZ | 97.7 FM | Eatonton | Southern Stone Broadcasting, Inc. | Classic hits |
| WMKP-LP | 98.9 FM | Oakwood | Totus Tuus Catholic Radio, Inc. | Catholic |
| WMLB | 1690 AM | Avondale Estates | JW Broadcasting, Inc. | Conservative talk |
| WMLT | 1330 AM | Dublin | State Radio License, Inc. | Contemporary Christian |
| WMNZ | 1050 AM | Montezuma | Macon County Broadcasting Co. | Country |
| WMOC | 88.7 FM | Lumber City | Full Gospel Church of God Written | Christian |
| WMOQ | 92.3 FM | Bostwick | Bostwick Broadcasting Group, Inc. | Classic country |
| WMRG | 93.5 FM | Morgan | Core Communicators South LLC | |
| WMRZ | 98.1 FM | Dawson | iHM Licenses, LLC | Urban adult contemporary |
| WMSL | 88.9 FM | Athens | Radio Training Network, Inc. | Contemporary Christian |
| WMTM | 1300 AM | Moultrie | Colquitt Broadcasting Company, LLC | Southern gospel |
| WMTM-FM | 93.9 FM | Moultrie | Colquitt Broadcasting Company, LLC | Classic hits |
| WMUM-FM | 89.7 FM | Cochran | Georgia Public Telecommunications Commission | Public radio |
| WMUV | 100.7 FM | Brunswick | Chesapeake-Portsmouth Broadcasting Corporation | Contemporary Christian |
| WMVG | 1450 AM | Milledgeville | Oconee Communications Company, LLC | Adult contemporary |
| WMVV | 90.7 FM | Griffin | Life Radio Ministries, Inc | Christian |
| WMVW | 91.7 FM | Peachtree City | Life Radio Ministries, Inc. | Christian |
| WNBO-LP | 93.1 FM | Americus | New Beginning Outreach Ministries of Americus, Inc. | Religious Teaching |
| WNEA | 1300 AM | Newnan | Word Christian Broadcasting, Inc. | Gospel |
| WNEE | 88.1 FM | Patterson | Community Public Radio, Inc. | Christian |
| WNEG | 630 AM | Toccoa | Georgia-Carolina Radiocasting Company, LLC | Classic hits |
| WNEX-FM | 100.9 FM | Perry | Creek Media, LLC | Americana |
| WNGA-LP | 102.1 FM | Talking Rock | Canton Pickens Radio, Inc. | Oldies |
| WNGC | 106.1 FM | Arcade | Cox Radio, LLC | Country |
| WNGH-FM | 98.9 FM | Chatsworth | Georgia Public Telecommunications Commission | Public radio |
| WNGU | 89.5 FM | Dahlonega | Georgia Public Telecommunications Commission | Public radio |
| WNIV | 970 AM | Atlanta | Salem Communications Holding Corporation | Christian talk |
| WNNG-FM | 99.9 FM | Unadilla | Augusta Radio Fellowship Institute | Christian (Good News Network) |
| WNNX | 100.5 FM | College Park | Radio License Holding SRC LLC | Classic alternative rock |
| WNOU | 107.7 FM | Sasser | First Media Services, LLC | Hot adult contemporary |
| WNRE-LP | 98.1 FM | Duluth | The Catholic Church of Saint Monica | Catholic |
| WNSY | 100.1 FM | Talking Rock | Davis Broadcasting of Atlanta, L.L.C. | Regional Mexican |
| WOAH | 106.3 FM | Glennville | Liberty Radio, Inc. | Mainstream urban |
| WOAK | 90.9 FM | La Grange | Oakside Christian School | Christian |
| WOBB | 100.3 FM | Tifton | iHM Licenses, LLC | Country |
| WOCE | 101.9 FM | Ringgold | North Georgia Radio Group, L.P. | Spanish |
| WOCE | 101.9 FM | Ringgold | North Georgia Radio Group, L.P. | Spanish |
| WOHJ | 95.7 FM | Leesburg | Philema Road Baptist Church | Christian |
| WOKA-FM | 106.7 FM | Douglas | Coffee County Broadcasters, Inc. | Country |
| WOKS | 1340 AM | Columbus | Davis Broadcasting, Inc. of Columbus | Urban oldies |
| WOUG-LP | 107.3 FM | Douglas | Senda de Vida Ministries, Inc. | Spanish religious |
| WPAA | 1190 AM | St. Marys | Lighthouse Christian Broadcasting Corp. | Christian |
| WPAX | 1240 AM | Thomasville | Lenrob Enterprises, Inc. | Adult standards/MOR |
| WPBS | 1040 AM | Conyers | Vanessa Nguyen | Vietnamese Music & Talk Programming |
| WPCG-LP | 102.9 FM | Canton | Cherokee FM Radio | Christian |
| WPCH | 1310 AM | West Point | iHM Licenses, LLC | Sports (FSR) |
| WPCZ-LP | 98.7 FM | Demorest | Piedmont College | Adult album alternative |
| WPEH | 1420 AM | Louisville | Peach Broadcasting Co., Inc. | Country |
| WPEH-FM | 92.1 FM | Louisville | Peach Broadcasting Co., Inc. | Oldies |
| WPES-LP | 94.7 FM | Savannah | Primeria Iglesia Bautista Hispana de Savannah Inc | Spanish religious |
| WPEZ | 93.7 FM | Jeffersonville | Cumulus Licensing LLC | Adult contemporary |
| WPGY | 1580 AM | Ellijay | Tri-State Communications, Inc. | Classic hits |
| WPLH | 88.3 FM | Tifton | Abraham Baldwin Agricultural College | |
| WPLO | 610 AM | Grayson | Teresa Esquivel | Spanish / Mexican music programming |
| WPLP-LP | 93.3 FM | Athens | The Athenian Multicultural Study Club | Alternative rock |
| WPMA | 102.7 FM | Buckhead | Augusta Radio Fellowship Institute, Inc. | Christian (Good News Network) |
| WPMX | 94.9 FM | Millen | Radio Statesboro, Inc. | Adult contemporary |
| WPNG | 101.9 FM | Pearson | Broadcast South, LLC | Rock |
| WPPL | 103.9 FM | Blue Ridge | WPPL Mountain Country Radio, LLC | Country |
| WPPP-LP | 100.7 FM | Athens | The Web Rights Association | Rock |
| WPPR | 88.3 FM | Demorest | Georgia Public Telecommunications Commission | Public radio |
| WPRW-FM | 107.7 FM | Martinez | iHM Licenses, LLC | Mainstream urban |
| WPTB | 850 AM | Statesboro | Radio Statesboro, Inc. | Top 40 (CHR) |
| WPUP | 100.1 FM | Watkinsville | Cox Radio, LLC | Top 40 (CHR) |
| WPWB | 90.5 FM | Macon | Good News Network | Christian (Good News Network) |
| WPZE | 102.5 FM | Mableton | New Mableton Broadcasting Corporation | Gospel |
| WQAI | 89.5 FM | Thomson | Educational Media Foundation | Worship music (Air1) |
| WQBT | 94.1 FM | Savannah | iHM Licenses, LLC | Urban contemporary |
| WQBZ | 106.3 FM | Fort Valley | iHM Licenses, LLC | Classic rock |
| WQCH | 1590 AM | Lafayette | Radix Broadcasting, Inc. | Country |
| WQEE-LP | 99.1 FM | Newnan | New Vision Communications Corp | Variety |
| WQGA | 103.3 FM | Waycross | iHM Licenses, LLC | Hot adult contemporary |
| WQIL | 101.3 FM | Chauncey | GSW, Inc. | Mainstream rock |
| WQLI | 92.3 FM | Meigs | Flint Media, Inc. | Adult contemporary |
| WQMJ | 100.1 FM | Forsyth | Roberts Communications, Inc. | Urban oldies |
| WQPW | 95.7 FM | Valdosta | RTG Radio, LLC, Debtor-in-Possession | Adult contemporary |
| WQTS | 102.9 FM | Statesboro | The Power Foundation | Southern gospel |
| WQTU | 102.3 FM | Rome | Rome Radio Partners, LLC | Adult contemporary |
| WQVE | 101.7 FM | Albany | First Media Services, LLC | Urban adult contemporary |
| WQXI | 790 AM | Atlanta | Atlanta Radio Korea, Inc. | Korean |
| WQZY | 95.9 FM | Dublin | State Radio License, Inc. | Country |
| WRAF | 90.9 FM | Toccoa Falls | Radio Training Network, Inc. | Christian radio (HIS Radio) |
| WRAS | 88.5 FM | Atlanta | Georgia State University | College |
| WRBF | 104.9 FM | Plainville | H.C. Toole, LLC | Classic hits |
| WRBV | 101.7 FM | Warner Robins | iHM Licenses, LLC | Urban adult contemporary |
| WRBX | 104.1 FM | Reidsville | William Keith Register | Spanish |
| WRCG | 1420 AM | Columbus | PMB Broadcasting, LLC | Classic rock |
| WRDG | 96.1 FM | Atlanta | iHM Licenses, LLC | Urban contemporary |
| WRDO | 96.9 FM | Fitzgerald | Broadcast South, LLC | Classic hits |
| WREK | 91.1 FM | Atlanta | Radio Communications Board, Georgia Institute of Technology | College radio |
| WRFC | 960 AM | Athens | Cox Radio, LLC | Sports (ESPN) |
| WRFG | 89.3 FM | Atlanta | Radio Free Georgia Broadcasting Foundation, Inc. | Indie |
| WRGA | 1470 AM | Rome | Rome Radio Partners, LLC | News/Talk |
| WRGC-FM | 88.3 FM | Milledgeville | Georgia College & State University | Public radio |
| WRHQ | 105.3 FM | Richmond Hill | Thoroughbred Communications, Inc. | Adult album alternative |
| WRJS | 88.1 FM | Soperton | Grace Missionary Baptist Church d/b/a Grace Christian School | Conservative Christian |
| WRJY | 104.1 FM | Brunswick | Golden Isles Broadcasting, LLC | Country |
| WRLA | 1490 AM | West Point | Tiger Communications, Inc. | Classic hits |
| WRMK-LP | 100.3 FM | Augusta | The Good News Church | Religious |
| WROM | 710 AM | Rome | Rome Radio Partners, LLC | Top 40 (CHR) |
| WRRD | 89.9 FM | Greensboro | Pensacola Christian College, Inc. | Religious |
| WRUU-LP | 107.5 FM | Savannah | Unitarian Universalist Church of Savannah, Inc. | Variety |
| WRUX-LP | 103.7 FM | Atlanta | The Church in Atlanta | Religious |
| WRWH | 1350 AM | Cleveland | White County Media, LLC | News/Talk |
| WRWR | 107.5 FM | Cochran | Praise 107.5 FM Radio LLC | Urban adult contemporary |
| WRXR-FM | 105.5 FM | Rossville | Audacy License, LLC | Active rock |
| WRZX | 1400 AM | Newnan | iHM Licenses, LLC | Sports (FSR) |
| WSB | 750 AM | Atlanta | Cox Radio, LLC | News/Talk |
| WSB-FM | 98.5 FM | Atlanta | Cox Radio, LLC | Adult contemporary |
| WSBB-FM | 95.5 FM | Doraville | Cox Radio, LLC | News/Talk |
| WSDA-LP | 98.7 FM | Trenton | Mountain Educational Services, Corp. | Southern gospel |
| WSEF-LP | 99.5 FM | Dalton | St. Joseph Catholic Church | Catholic |
| WSEG | 1400 AM | Savannah | Southern Media Interactive LLC | Sports (ESPN) |
| WSFB | 1490 AM | Quitman | Smalltown Broadcasting, LLC | Talk |
| WSFN | 790 AM | Brunswick | Southern Media Interactive LLC | Sports (ESPN) |
| WSGA | 92.3 FM | Hinesville | WRGO-FM Radio LLC | Classic country |
| WSGC | 105.3 FM | Tignall | WSGC Radio LLC | |
| WSGF-LP | 102.7 FM | Bloomingdale | Lifespring Worship Center | Religious Teaching |
| WSGT | 107.1 FM | Patterson | Higgs Multimedia Group, LLC | Classic hits |
| WSIZ-FM | 102.3 FM | Jacksonville | Middle Georgia Community Radio | Classic hits |
| WSLT | 88.5 FM | Statesboro | Salt and Light Communications, Inc. | |
| WSNT | 1490 AM | Sandersville | Radio Station WSNT, Inc. | Country |
| WSNT-FM | 99.9 FM | Sandersville | Radio Station WSNT, Inc. | Country |
| WSOK | 1230 AM | Savannah | iHM Licenses, LLC | Gospel |
| WSRA | 1250 AM | Albany | Livingston W. Fulton | Sports (ISN) |
| WSRD-LP | 93.1 FM | Albany | Sonshine Radio Corporation | Christian (LifeTalk Radio) |
| WSRM | 93.5 FM | Coosa | Rome Radio Partners, LLC | Classic country |
| WSRV | 97.1 FM | Gainesville | Cox Radio, LLC | Classic hits |
| WSSI | 92.7 FM | St. Simons Island | Golden Isles Broadcasting, LLC | Classic hits |
| WSTI-FM | 105.3 FM | Quitman | RTG Radio, LLC, Debtor-in-Possession | Urban contemporary |
| WSTR | 94.1 FM | Smyrna | Audacy License, LLC | Hot adult contemporary |
| WSTT | 730 AM | Thomasville | Marion R. Williams | Gospel |
| WSVH | 91.1 FM | Savannah | Georgia Public Telecommunications Commission | Public radio |
| WSWD-LP | 103.9 FM | Tifton | Sure Word Broadcasting Company, Inc. | Religious Teaching |
| WSWL-LP | 104.7 FM | Valdosta | Echo Broadcasting Network, Inc. | Silent |
| WTCQ | 97.7 FM | Vidalia | RadioJones, LLC | Classic hits |
| WTGA-FM | 101.1 FM | Thomaston | Radio Georgia, Inc. | Classic hits |
| WTHB | 1550 AM | Augusta | Perry Broadcasting of Augusta, Inc. | Urban gospel |
| WTHB-FM | 100.9 FM | Wrens | Perry Broadcasting of Augusta, Inc. | Urban gospel |
| WTHG | 104.7 FM | Hinesville | WRGO-FM Radio LLC d/b/a Savannah Radio | Classic hits |
| WTHO-FM | 101.7 FM | Thomson | Camellia City Communications, Inc. | Country |
| WTHP | 94.3 FM | Gibson | Augusta Radio Fellowship Institute, Inc. | Christian (Good News Network) |
| WTIF | 1340 AM | Tifton | Journey Church of Tifton, Inc. | Silent |
| WTIF-FM | 107.5 FM | Omega | Journey Church of Tifton, Inc. | Silent |
| WTJB | 91.7 FM | Columbus | Troy University | Public radio; Classical |
| WTKS | 1290 AM | Savannah | iHM Licenses, LLC | News/Talk |
| WTLD | 90.5 FM | Jesup | Resurrection House Ministries, Inc. | Gospel |
| WTNL | 1390 AM | Reidsville | William Keith Register | Southern gospel |
| WTOA-LP | 101.3 FM | Albany | St. Teresa Catholic School | Catholic |
| WTOC-FM | 96.3 FM | Clayton | Sutton Radiocasting Corporation | Adult contemporary |
| WTRP | 620 AM | La Grange | Tiger Communications, Inc. | Classic country |
| WTSH-FM | 107.1 FM | Aragon | Woman's World Broadcasting, I.N.C. | Regional Mexican |
| WTTI | 1530 AM | Dalton | Hope Broadcasting, Inc. | Christian |
| WTTY | 97.7 FM | Ty Ty | Greater 2nd Mt. Olive Missionary Baptist Church | Urban adult contemporary |
| WTUF | 106.3 FM | Boston | Boston Radio Company, Inc. | Country |
| WTWA | 1240 AM | Thomson | Camellia City Communications, Inc. | Oldies |
| WTXR | 89.7 FM | Toccoa Falls | Radio Training Network, Inc. | Contemporary worship (HIS Radio Praise) |
| WTYB | 103.9 FM | Tybee Island | Cumulus Licensing LLC | Urban adult contemporary |
| WUBL | 94.9 FM | Atlanta | iHM Licenses, LLC | Country |
| WUCG-LP | 93.1 FM | Blairsville | The Missionary Quartermaster, Inc. | Positive Country/Southern gospel/Bluegrass |
| WUFE | 1260 AM | Baxley | South Georgia Broadcasters, Inc. | Classic hits |
| WUFF | 710 AM | Eastman | Dodge Broadcasting, Inc. | Country |
| WUFF-FM | 97.5 FM | Eastman | Dodge Broadcasting, Inc. | Country |
| WUGA | 91.7 FM | Athens | Georgia Public Telecommunications Commission | Public radio |
| WUGC-LP | 102.7 FM | Pelham | Mitchell County Public Radio LLC | Variety |
| WUKV | 95.7 FM | Trion | Educational Media Foundation | Contemporary Christian (K-Love) |
| WULK | 94.7 FM | Crawfordville | Wyche Services Corporation | Country |
| WULS | 103.7 FM | Broxton | WULS Inc. | Bluegrass & Southern gospel |
| WUMJ | 97.5 FM | Fayetteville | Radio One Licenses, LLC | Urban adult contemporary |
| WUNV | 91.7 FM | Albany | Georgia Public Telecommunications Commission | Public radio |
| WUOG | 90.5 FM | Athens | The University of Georgia | College radio |
| WUTU | 88.3 FM | Sasser | Southwest Georgia Project for Community Education, Inc. | |
| WUWG | 90.7 FM | Carrollton | Georgia Public Telecommunications Commission | Public radio |
| WUXL | 1400 AM | Macon | B&GRS Enterprises, LLC | Urban Gospel |
| WVDA | 88.5 FM | Valdosta | American Family Association | Christian Talk (AFR) |
| WVEE | 103.3 FM | Atlanta | Audacy License, LLC | Urban contemporary |
| WVFJ-FM | 93.3 FM | Manchester | Radio Training Network, Inc. | Contemporary Christian |
| WVGA | 105.9 FM | Lakeland | RTG Radio, LLC, Debtor-in-Possession | News/Talk |
| WVGC | 1400 AM | Elberton | WSGC Radio LLC | Urban adult contemporary |
| WVGS | 91.9 FM | Statesboro | Georgia Southern University | College / Top 40 (CHR) |
| WVHY | 97.1 FM | Axson | Becky Vickers, Personal Representative | Classic hits |
| WVKV | 95.3 FM | Nashville | Educational Media Foundation | Contemporary Christian (K-Love) |
| WVKX | 103.7 FM | Irwinton | Wilkinson Broadcasting, Inc. | Urban contemporary |
| WVLD | 1450 AM | Valdosta | RTG Radio, LLC, Debtor-in-Possession | Mainstream rock |
| WVOH-FM | 93.5 FM | Nicholls | Broadcast South, LLC | Top 40 (CHR) |
| WVOP | 970 AM | Vidalia | RadioJones, LLC | News/Talk |
| WVRK | 102.9 FM | Columbus | iHM Licenses, LLC | Mainstream rock |
| WVVS-FM | 90.9 FM | Valdosta | Board of the University System of Georgia/Valdosta State University | College/Diverse |
| WWET | 91.7 FM | Valdosta | Georgia Public Telecommunications Commission | Public radio |
| WWEV-FM | 91.5 FM | Cumming | RLN Global, Inc. | Christian |
| WWEZ-LP | 94.7 FM | St. Simons Island | St. Simons Radio, Inc. | Silent |
| WWGA | 98.9 FM | Tallapoosa | WKNG, LLC | Classic hits |
| WWGF | 107.5 FM | Donalsonville | Augusta Radio Fellowship Institute, Inc. | Christian (Good News Network) |
| WWGW-LP | 102.5 FM | Moultrie | Colquitt County Radiocasting, Inc. | Variety |
| WWIO-FM | 88.9 FM | Brunswick | Georgia Public Telecommunications Commission | Public radio |
| WWKM | 93.1 FM | Rochelle | Shanks Broadcasting, LLC | Sports (ESPN) |
| WWLD | 102.3 FM | Cairo | Cumulus Licensing LLC | Urban contemporary |
| WWNS | 1240 AM | Statesboro | Radio Statesboro, Inc. | Conservative talk |
| WWPW | 105.3 FM | Bowdon | iHM Licenses, LLC | Top 40 (CHR) |
| WWQA | 90.7 FM | Albany | The Power Foundation | Southern gospel (The Life FM) |
| WWQE | 89.7 FM | Elberton | The Power Foundation | Southern gospel (The Life FM) |
| WWRQ-FM | 107.9 FM | Valdosta | RTG Radio, LLC, Debtor-in-Possession | Urban contemporary |
| WWSZ | 1420 AM | Decatur | JDJ Communications, LLC | World Ethnic |
| WWUF | 97.7 FM | Waycross | Higgs Multimedia Group, LLC | Hot adult contemporary |
| WWWD | 102.1 FM | Bolingbroke | Radio Training Network | Contemporary Christian |
| WWWE | 1310 AM | Decatur | Davis Broadcasting of Atlanta, L.L.C. | Latin pop |
| WWWQ | 99.7 FM | Atlanta | Radio License Holding SRC LLC | Top 40 (CHR) |
| WXAG | 1470 AM | Athens | Mecca Communications, Inc. | Urban contemporary |
| WXEM | 1460 AM | Buford | La Favorita, Inc. | Regional Mexican |
| WXFC-LP | 92.7 FM | Blue Ridge | Fannin County Board of Education | Variety |
| WXJO | 1120 AM | Douglasville | Condrey Media LLC | Urban Gospel |
| WXKG | 1010 AM | Atlanta | Light Media Holdings, Inc. | South Asian |
| WXKO | 1150 AM | Fort Valley | Shanks Broadcasting, LLC | Sports (ESPN) |
| WXKT | 103.7 FM | Maysville | Cox Radio, LLC | Adult hits |
| WXLI | 1230 AM | Dublin | Laurens County Broadcasting Co., Inc | Country |
| WXMK | 105.9 FM | Dock Junction | Golden Isles Broadcasting, LLC | Hot adult contemporary |
| WXNV-LP | 105.1 FM | Loganville | New Vision Outreach & Performing Arts Ministries | Contemporary Christian |
| WXPB-LP | 105.7 FM | Athens | St. Joseph's Catholic Church and School | Catholic |
| WXRS | 1590 AM | Swainsboro | Radiojones, LLC | Classic hits |
| WXRS-FM | 100.5 FM | Swainsboro | Radiojones, LLC | Country |
| WXVS | 90.1 FM | Waycross | Georgia Public Telecommunications Commission | Public radio |
| WXYY | 100.1 FM | Rincon | Dick Broadcasting Company, Inc. of Tennessee | Rhythmic contemporary |
| WYAW-LP | 93.5 FM | Savannah | Savannah Adventist LPFM | Christian |
| WYBO | 92.9 FM | Waynesboro | John Smith | Rhythmic oldies |
| WYFA | 107.1 FM | Waynesboro | Bible Broadcasting Network, Inc. | Conservative religious (Bible Broadcasting Network) |
| WYFK | 89.5 FM | Columbus | Bible Broadcasting Network, Inc. | Conservative religious (Bible Broadcasting Network) |
| WYFS | 89.5 FM | Savannah | Bible Broadcasting Network, Inc. | Conservative religious (Bible Broadcasting Network) |
| WYFW | 89.5 FM | Winder | Bible Broadcasting Network, Inc. | Conservative religious (Bible Broadcasting Network) |
| WYIS | 1410 AM | Mcrae | Cinecom Broadcasting Systems, Inc. | Classic hits |
| WYKG | 1430 AM | Covington | Light Media Holdings, Inc. | Urban inspirational |
| WYNF | 1340 AM | Augusta | iHM Licenses, LLC | Black-oriented news (BIN) |
| WYNR | 102.5 FM | Waycross | iHM Licenses, LLC | Country |
| WYPZ | 900 AM | Macon | Sun Broadcasting, Inc. | Urban adult contemporary |
| WYSC | 102.7 FM | Mcrae | Cinecom Broadcasting Systems, Inc. | Classic hits |
| WYTH | 1250 AM | Madison | Agape Life Ministries, Inc. | Urban contemporary gospel |
| WYUM | 101.7 FM | Mount Vernon | RadioJones, LLC | Country |
| WYYU | 104.5 FM | Dalton | North Georgia Radio Group, L.P. | Adult contemporary |
| WYYZ | 1490 AM | Jasper | KRMA Media Group, LLC | Country |
| WYZE | 1480 AM | Atlanta | New Ground Broadcasting, LLC | Gospel |
| WYZI | 810 AM | Royston | Oconee River Broadcasting, LLC | Urban adult contemporary |
| WZAE | 93.3 FM | Wadley | Radio Training Network, Inc. | Contemporary Christian |
| WZBN | 105.5 FM | Camilla | Greater 2nd Mt. Olive Missionary Baptist Church | Urban contemporary gospel |
| WZGC | 92.9 FM | Atlanta | Audacy License, LLC | Sports (ISN/BetQL) |
| WZIQ | 106.5 FM | Smithville | Augusta Radio Fellowship Institute, Inc. | Christian (Good News Network) |
| WZOT | 1220 AM | Rockmart | Heirborn Broadcasting, LLC | Christian |
| WZQZ | 1180 AM | Trion | HS Productions, Inc. | Classic country |
| WZTG | 91.7 FM | Clayton | Solid Foundation Broadcasting Corporation | |
| WZTR | 104.3 FM | Dahlonega | Augusta Radio Fellowship Institute, Inc. | Christian (Good News Network) |
| WZYN | 810 AM | Hahira | Bemiss Road Baptist Church and Lowndes Cty Christian Academy | Southern Gospel |

== Defunct ==
- WACL (570 AM)
- WAYS
- WBHB
- WBKZ (880 AM, Athens, Georgia)
- WBMQ
- WBRQ
- WBUE-LP
- WCHZ-FM
- WCUG (Cuthbert, Georgia)
- WGAF (910 AM, Valdosta)
- WGHC (FM), Tallulah Falls
- WGHC (1400 AM), Clayton
- WGM (AM)
- WGMI
- WGML
- WGPC
- WHLE-LP
- WJGS
- WJLG
- WJTP
- WLVN-LP
- WMGA (1130 AM, Moultrie)
- WRFV
- WSEM (1500 AM, Donalsonville)
- WSYL
- WTRH
- WWGS (1430 AM, Tifton)

== See also ==
- Georgia media
  - List of newspapers in Georgia (U.S. state)
  - List of television stations in Georgia (U.S. state)
  - Media of cities in Georgia: Athens, Atlanta, Augusta, Columbus, Macon, Savannah
- Georgia Association of Broadcasters

== Bibliography ==
- Jack Alicoate, ed. (1939), "Georgia", Radio Annual, New York: Radio Daily, OCLC 2459636 – via Internet Archive
- Chas. A. Alicoate, ed. (1957), "Amplitude Modulation Stations - AM: Georgia", Radio Annual and Television Yearbook, New York: Radio Daily Corp., OCLC 10512206 – via Internet Archive
- "AM Stations in the U.S.: Georgia", Radio Annual Television Year Book, New York: Radio Television Daily, 1963, OCLC 10512375 – via Internet Archive

== Images ==
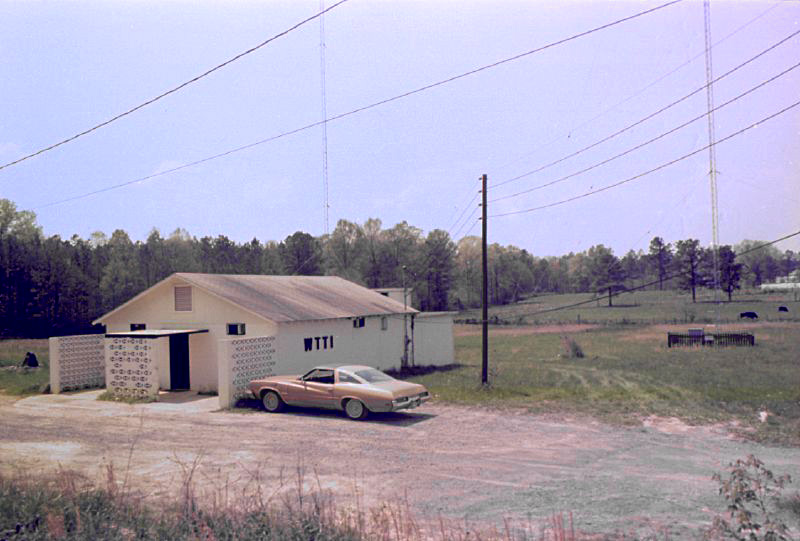
WTTI radio transmitter building near Westside, Georgia, circa 1970s

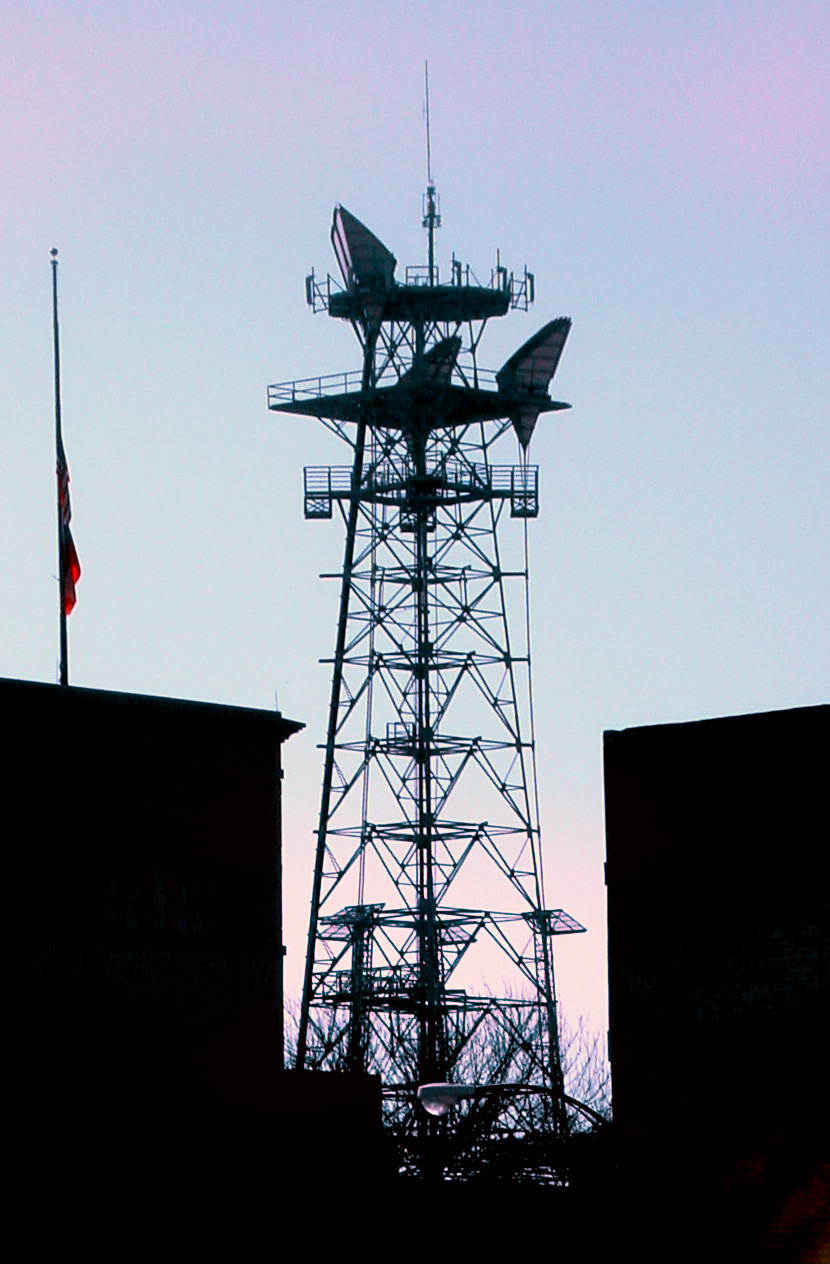
Radio tower, Augusta, 2006

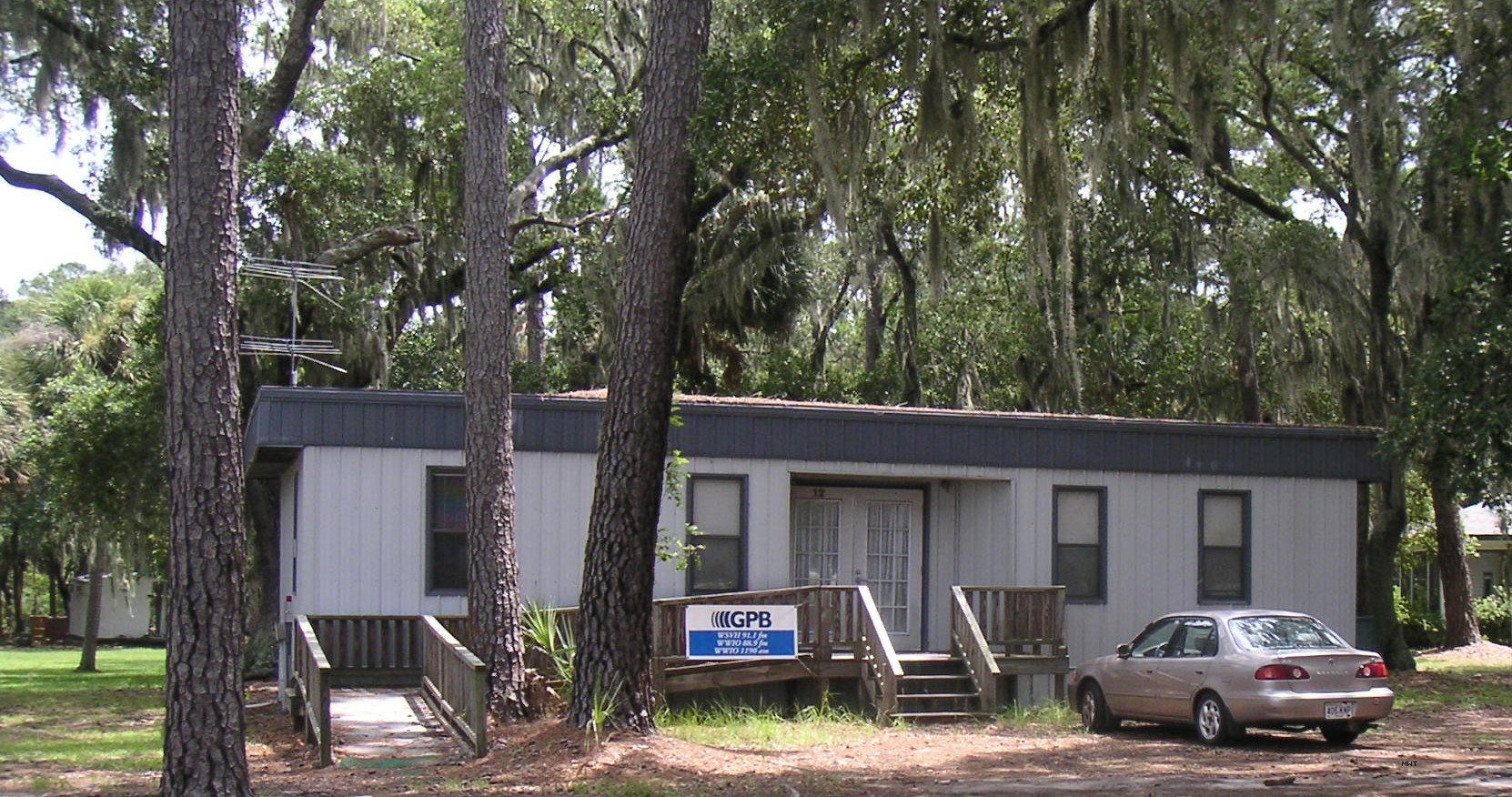
WSVH radio, Skidaway Island, Georgia, 2007

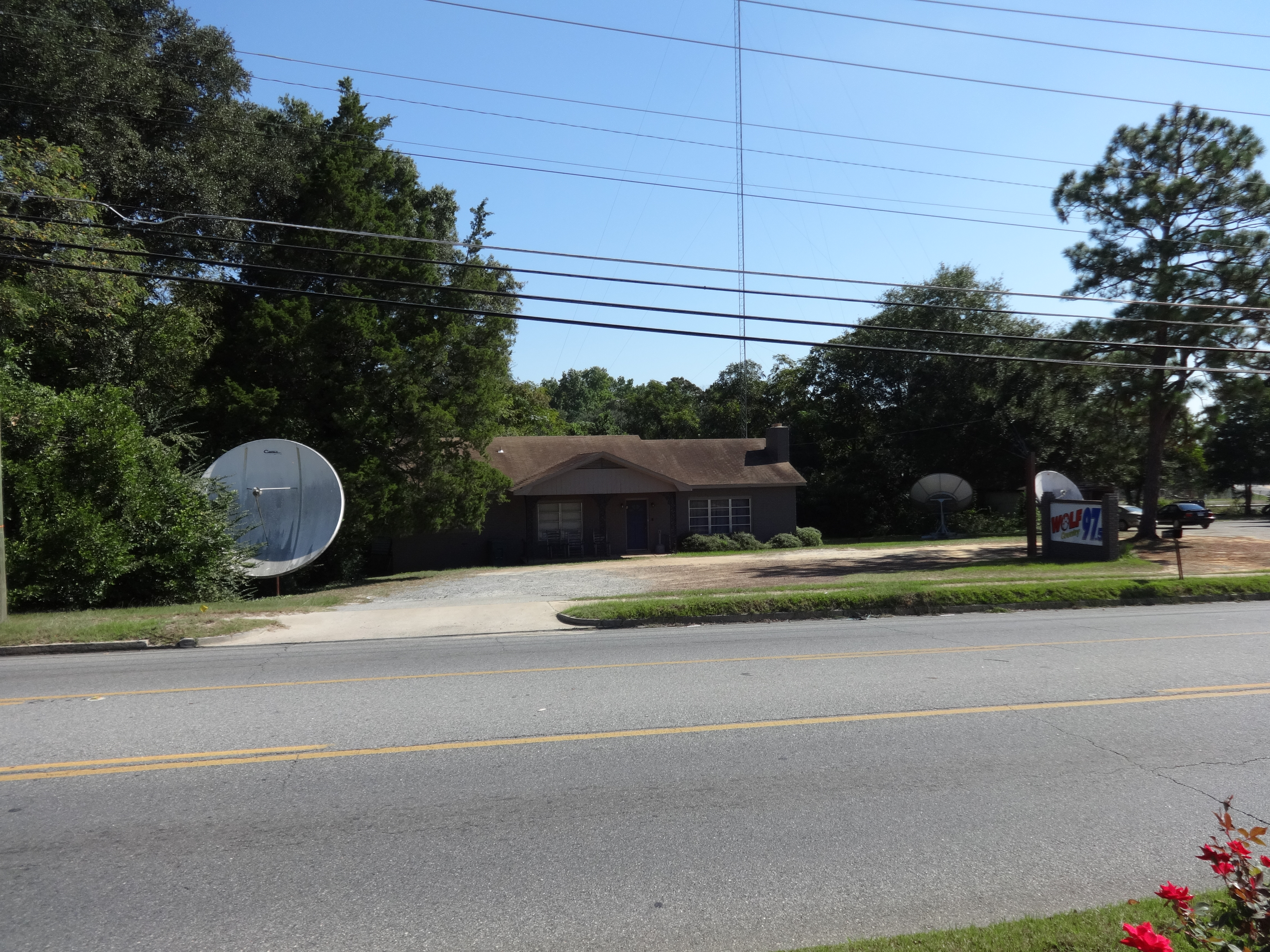
WOLF 97.5FM radio station, Eastman, Georgia, 2014
