= WSGA =

WSGA may refer to:

- WSGA (FM), a radio station (92.3 FM) licensed to Hinesville, Georgia, United States
- WSEG, a radio station (1400 AM) in Savannah, Georgia, United States, which held the call sign WSGA from 1956 to 1999
- WTHG, a radio station (104.7 FM) in Hinesville, Georgia, United States, which held the call sign WSGA from 2002 to 2006
- WXYY, a radio station (100.1 FM) in Rincon, Georgia, United States, which briefly held the call sign WSGA in 2006
- Washington State Golf Association
- Wyoming Stock Growers Association
