= WXGA =

WXGA may refer to:

- Wide Extended Graphics Array, a computer graphics display resolution
- WXGA-TV, a television station in the U.S. state of Georgia
