= WJYI =

WJYI may refer to:

- WJYI (FM), a radio station (103.1 FM) licensed to serve Tipton, Georgia, United States
- WJYI (AM), a defunct radio station (1230 AM) formerly licensed to serve Norfolk, Virginia, United States
