= WBLY =

WBLY may refer to:

- WBLY-LP, a low-power radio station (101.5 FM) licensed to serve Sycamore, Georgia, United States
- WULM, a radio station (1600 AM) licensed to serve Springfield, Ohio, United States, which held the call sign WBLY from 1954 to 2002
- WDHT, a radio station (102.9 FM) licensed to serve Urbana, Ohio, which held the call sign WBLY-FM from 1958 to 1979
