= WHCJ =

Savannah, Georgia; United States
- Broadcast area: Chatham County, Georgia, and Beaufort County, South Carolina
- Frequency: 90.3 MHz

Programming
- Format: variety

Ownership
- Owner: Savannah State University

History
- First air date: 1975

Technical information
- Licensing authority: FCC
- Facility ID: 59247
- Class: A
- ERP: 6,000 watts
- HAAT: 68 meters (223 ft)
- Transmitter coordinates: 32°01′28″N 81°03′23″W

Links
- Public license information: Public file; LMS
- Website: WHCJ Online

WHCJ, 90.3 FM, is a campus variety radio station in Savannah, Georgia, owned by Savannah State University. The station's studios are located on campus at Hodge Hall, with the transmitter located just next door.

WHCJ broadcasts 24 hours a day, with a signal covering Savannah, all of Chatham County, and can also be heard in Effingham, Bryan, Beaufort, and Liberty counties.

== History ==
WHCJ was established in 1975 as a non-commercial, educational public radio facility under the auspices of Savannah State.

== Format and playlist ==
The station's primary mission is to educate the listening audience through selective programming and to promote and enhance the image of Savannah State University. The goal of WHCJ, like other public radio stations is to present quality alternative programming that is not available on other outlets. Known as "the Voice of Savannah State University" the station plays jazz, reggae, gospel, blues, salsa, hip hop, and alternative soul music. Additionally the station broadcasts a lineup of talk shows, commentary, cultural enrichment and African-American educational programs.

As a public radio station located on the campus of an historically Black university, WHCJ has become the principal source of cultural programming for Savannah's African-American community, but the station's audience is considerable and diverse; not limited to any one ethnic group.

== See also ==
- Campus radio
- List of college radio stations in the United States
- List of historically black colleges of the United States
- List of radio stations in Georgia (U.S. state)
