= WPPR =

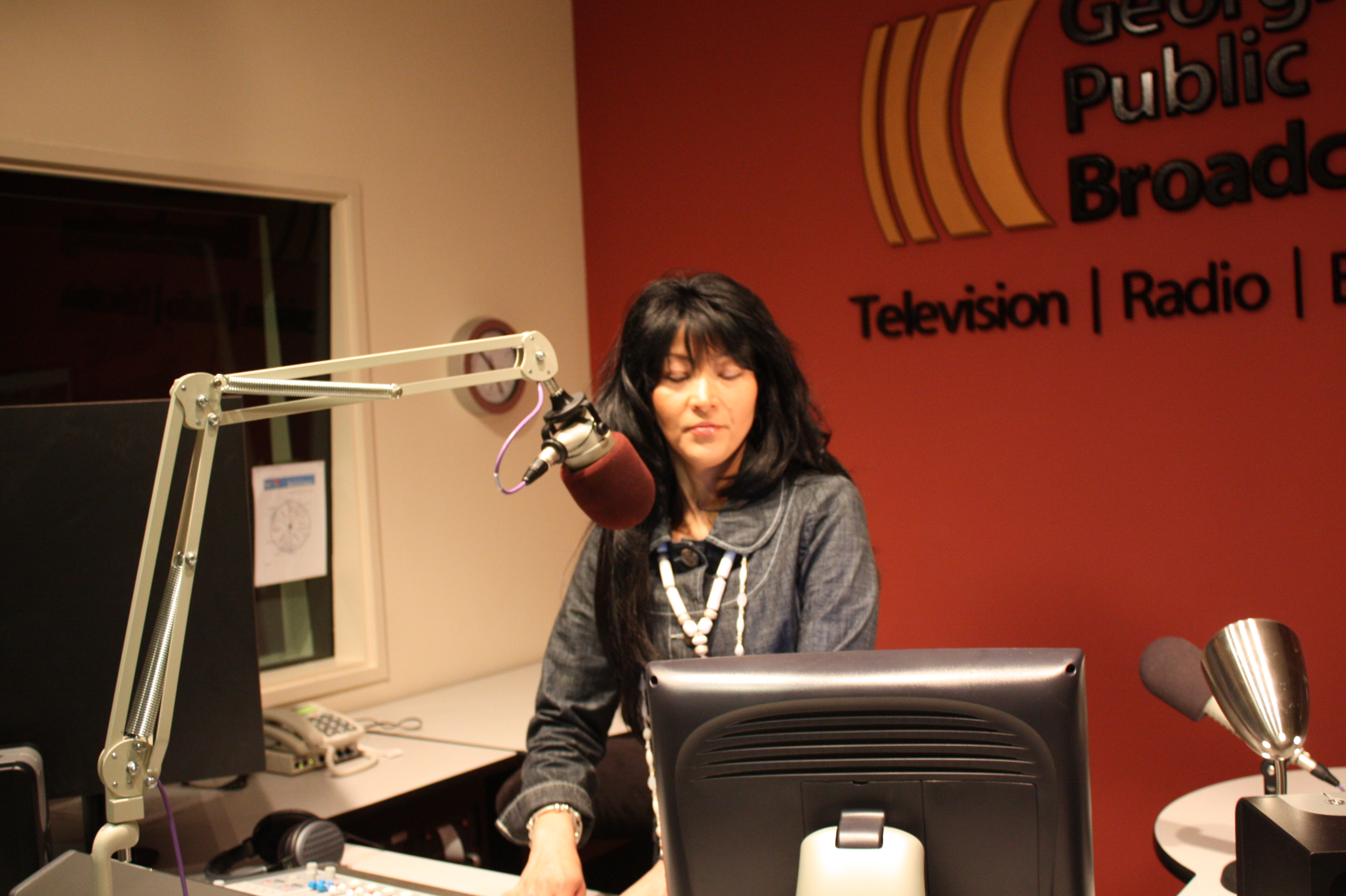
- Demorest, Georgia; United States
- Broadcast area: Northeast Georgia
- Frequency: 88.3 MHz
- Branding: Georgia Public Broadcasting

Programming
- Format: Public broadcasting
- Affiliations: NPR/PRI/American Public Media

Ownership
- Owner: Georgia Public Broadcasting

History
- Former call signs: WDEM (Radio Demorest)
- Call sign meaning: Piedmont Public Radio (named after Piedmont College)

Technical information
- Licensing authority: FCC
- Facility ID: 23949
- Class: C2
- ERP: 7,300 watts
- HAAT: 193.9 m (636.2 ft)
- Transmitter coordinates: 34°31′24.4″N 83°40′45.6″W

Links
- Public license information: Public file; LMS
- Website: www.GPB.org/WPPR

WPPR (88.3) is a public radio station in Demorest, Georgia. Originally, WPPR had the call letters WDEM (Radio Demorest), but changed to WPPR on August 19, 1996. It is part of the Georgia Public Broadcasting radio network, which in turn is a member of National Public Radio, Public Radio International, and American Public Media. Unlike many stations of the GPB network, WPPR does not only broadcast simulcasts from GPB. WPPR also produces its own programming about the local area including Habersham County. One of the community features, Community Life in Northeast Georgia, is an educational and informative program about an area that is not well known. WPPR's studios are located inside the Swanson Center for Communications and the Performing Arts on the Piedmont College campus on College Drive in Demorest. This allows for Piedmont Mass Communications students to work directly with WPPR as interns.

== See also ==
- List of radio stations in Georgia (U.S. state)
- Piedmont College
