= WRHQ =

- Richmond Hill, Georgia; United States
- Broadcast area: Savannah metropolitan area
- Frequency: 105.3 MHz
- Branding: Quality Rock Q105.3

Programming
- Format: Adult Album Alternative

Ownership
- Owner: Bradley Creek Communications (O.C. Welch III)

History
- First air date: May 13, 1991
- Call sign meaning: W Richmond Hill Quality Rock

Technical information
- Facility ID: 66974
- Class: C3
- ERP: 11,000 watts
- HAAT: 148 meters (486 ft)
- Transmitter coordinates: 32°02′52″N 81°07′20″W

Links
- Webcast: Listen Live
- Website: wrhq.com

WRHQ (105.3 MHz) is a commercial FM radio station licensed to Richmond Hill, Georgia and serving the Savannah metropolitan area. It is owned by Bradley Creek Communications and airs an adult album alternative radio format. WRHQ's studios are located in Midtown Savannah south of Daffin Park, and its transmitter site is southwest of historic downtown.

WRHQ calls its sound "Quality Rock," a mix of classic rock, alternative rock, adult contemporary, classic hits and other genres. It is the only station in the Savannah radio market that is locally owned and operated. WRHQ General Manager Jerry Rogers, a Savannah radio veteran for more than 50 years, owned the station until 2023. Ownership of the station was sold to local car dealership owner O.C. Welch III's company Bradley Creek Communications in 2023 for $1.7 million. The General Manager is Larry Silbermann and The Operations Manager / Program Director is Tripp Rogers.

== History ==
After WLOW-FM (now WRWN) moved to 107.9 from 105.5, a vacant allotment was created at 105.3 MHz for Richmond Hill, a suburban community about 15 miles southwest of Savannah. On May 13, 1991, WRHQ signed on the air. At first, it was powered at 3,000 watts, put on the air by its then-owner, Thoroughbred Broadcasting.

In the late 1990s, WRHQ's power was boosted to its current 11,000 watts. WRHQ has remained an adult album alternative/Rock AC hybrid for more than a quarter century.

== Current on-air staff ==
- 5:30 AM – 10 AM – Brady McGraw
- 10 AM – 3 PM – Lyndy Brannen
- 3 PM – 7 PM – Tripp Rogers

Weekends – Barri Marshall, Marguerite Springfield, Chris Sinclair, Sandy Anthony

== See also ==
- List of radio stations in Georgia (U.S. state)
- Georgia (U.S. state)
- Lists of radio stations in North and Central America
