= WUWG =

Radio station at the University of West Georgia

- Carrollton, Georgia; United States
- Broadcast area: Carroll County, Georgia
- Frequency: 90.7 MHz (HD Radio)
- Branding: WUWG FM 90.7

Programming
- Format: Public radio
- Affiliations: GPB

Ownership
- Owner: Georgia Public Broadcasting; (Georgia Public Telecommunications Commission)

History
- First air date: 1973
- Former call signs: WWGC (1973–2001)
- Call sign meaning: University of West Georgia, founder and former owner of the station

Technical information
- Licensing authority: FCC
- Facility ID: 71602
- Class: A
- ERP: 430 watts
- HAAT: 151 meters (495 ft)
- Transmitter coordinates: 33°33′50.4″N 85°1′3.8″W

Links
- Public license information: Public file; LMS

WUWG (90.7 FM) is the radio station that formerly broadcast at the University of West Georgia in Carrollton, Georgia, and is now a part of the Georgia Public Broadcasting radio state network. This station is one of several in the GPB system that also produces its own programming; however, the vast majority of the broadcast day is a simulcast of the statewide feed. That feed is also duplicated locally both by GPB's WJSP-FM in Warm Springs and WGPB-FM in Rome, with most NPR programming also carried by non-GPB station WABE from nearby Atlanta. Several programs are also duplicated on Atlanta's WRAS, most of whose broadcast day was involuntarily taken from Georgia State University students in June 2014, resulting in programs like Morning Edition and All Things Considered being aired in the Carrollton area on no fewer than five different frequencies at once for seven total hours every weekday. Originally licensed to the university and operated entirely by students, WUWG was transferred outright to GPB in 2004, though it is unclear under what circumstances. When GPB consolidated broadcasting operations in its Atlanta offices in 2008, Dr. Brad Yates, chair of the UWG Mass Communications department, made advances to start a new student-run radio station.

== History ==
It has been on the air since 1973, originally with the call sign WWGC, when the school was named West Georgia College. The station previously broadcast a very diverse college radio format, but now carries mostly the GPB radio feed from Atlanta. With an omnidirectional antenna, it covers Carroll County and somewhat beyond with 500 watts ERP.

In August 1994, WWGC became an affiliate of Public Radio International. This allowed the school to terminate most of the student-created programs, and rely mainly on satellite feeds instead. The station ran a ratio of 70% satellite/network programming to 30% student programming, resulting in content probably more suited to WGC faculty, broadcasting that was not necessarily in the interest of the community at large or in accord with student preferences. WUWG airs local news and features, as well as a few student-produced programs in the evenings, but they are only a fraction of those provided previously before WGC obtained access to the public radio system.

In 2001, the station changed call letters from WWGC to WUWG, which reflected the school's name change. The University of West Georgia assumed its present name in 1995.

== See also ==
- Campus radio
- List of college radio stations in the United States
