= WSVH =

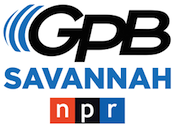

Savannah, Georgia; United States
- Broadcast area: Savannah/Brunswick, Georgia
- Frequency: 91.1 MHz (HD Radio)
- Branding: Georgia Public Radio

Programming
- Format: Public radio
- Subchannels: HD2: Classical music "GPB Classical"

Ownership
- Owner: Georgia Public Broadcasting; (Georgia Public Telecommunications Commission)

History
- First air date: April 20, 1981; 43 years ago
- Call sign meaning: Savannah

Technical information
- Licensing authority: FCC
- Facility ID: 23926
- Class: C0
- ERP: 96,000 watts
- HAAT: 430.9 meters (1,414 ft)
- Transmitter coordinates: 32°8′48.7″N 81°37′4.4″W
- Repeater(s): 88.9 WWIO-FM (Brunswick)

Links
- Public license information: Public file; LMS
- Webcast: Listen live
- Website: gpb.org/radio/stations/wsvh

WSVH (91.1 FM) is a 96,000-watt public radio station broadcasting from Savannah, Georgia, and transmitting from the WVAN-TV 9 (GPB TV) tower to the west in Pembroke, Georgia, north of Fort Stewart. It provides the radio service of Georgia Public Broadcasting (GPB) serves the upper Georgia coast and areas well inland, and adjacent areas of far southern South Carolina.

The station's signal is simulcast by GPB-owned WWIO-FM 88.9 in Brunswick, Georgia. Together, the two stations serve the entire Georgia coastline. Their signals can be heard from Beaufort, South Carolina to Fernandina Beach, Florida.

== History ==
One of the first unsolicited letters to the station came from the captain of a ship that sailed up and down the coast. He said, 'At last the void has been filled between Jacksonville and Charleston.'

— Aaron Buchsbaum, president of WSVH in 1987

Georgia Public Radio, Inc. (of no relation to GPB) was formed by local residents to build a public radio station for Savannah after locals had occasionally received public stations in Charleston, South Carolina, and Jacksonville, Florida. The station began broadcasting on April 20, 1981, with the first piece played on the station at 6 a.m. being Aaron Copland's Fanfare for the Common Man.

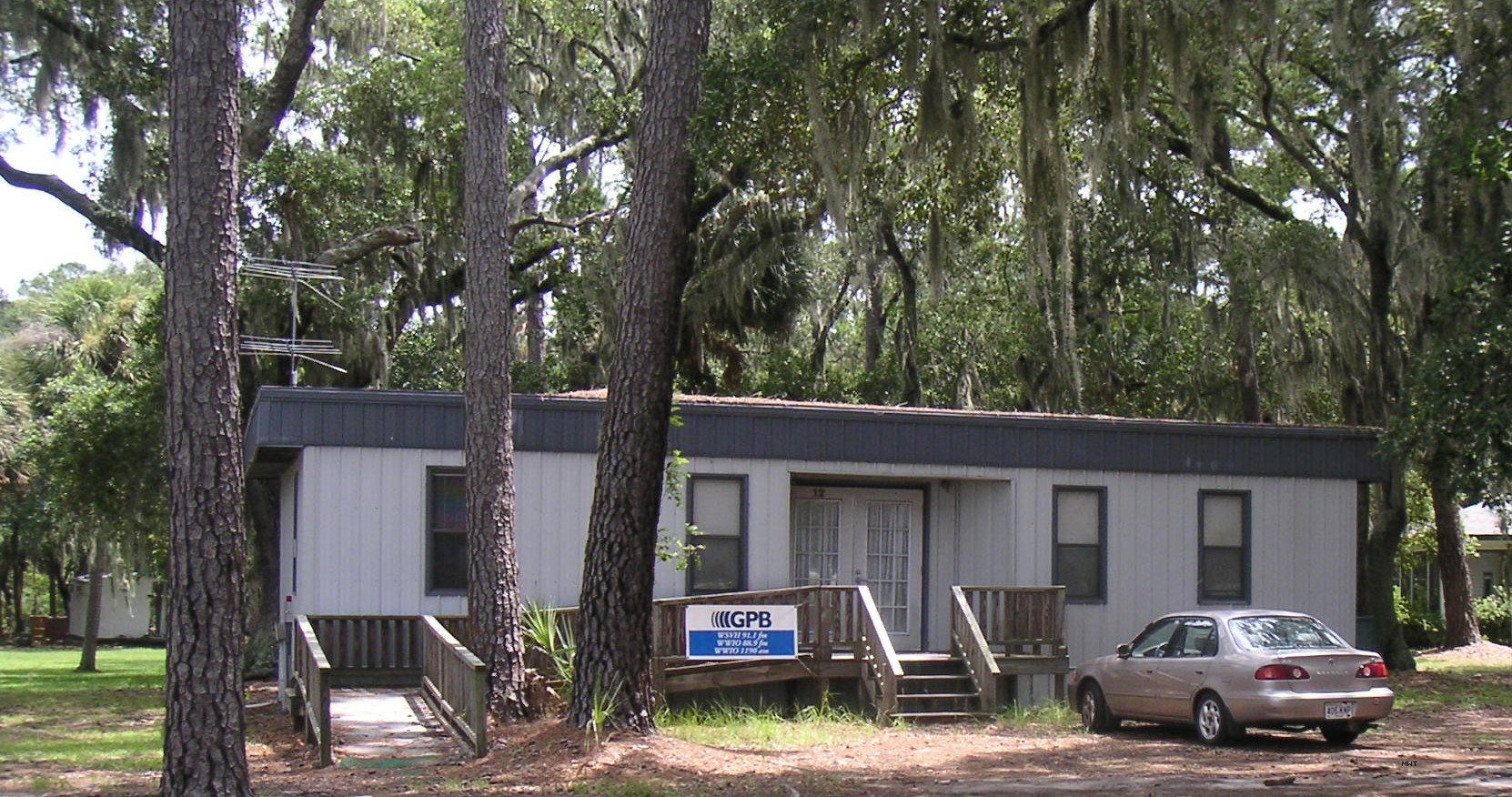
The trailer on the Skidaway Marine Science Campus, Skidaway Island, Georgia, from which WSVH operated until 2011.

In 1988, after surveying financial supporters, WSVH merged with Peach State Public Radio, the new state-owned service that had begun in 1985 to provide public radio to much of the unserved part of the state. In the early 1990s, the listening area was greatly improved with the addition of WWIO in extreme southeast Georgia; an overnight classical-music format was also added. In 1997, the station moved its studio from downtown Savannah to the Skidaway Institute of Oceanography on Skidaway Island, just south of Savannah. In August 2011, the WSVH/WWIO studios moved again to space at the Armstrong Center of Armstrong State University.

In past years, WSVH was one of two member stations of the GPB Radio network to have local announcers and underwriting during the day. WSVH produced four radio programs for the GPB network: Celtic program The Green Island Radio Show with Harry O'Donoghue, folk show Music Americana with Russell Wells, "Classical Tonight", also hosted by Russell Wells, and the overnight classical block Coastal Nocturne.

== See also ==
- List of radio stations in Georgia (U.S. state)
