= Non-commercial educational station =

Radio or TV station that does not accept on-air advertisements

A non-commercial educational station (NCE station) is a radio station or television station that does not accept on-air advertisements (TV ads or radio ads), as defined in the United States by the Federal Communications Commission (FCC) and was originally intended to offer educational programming as part, or whole, of its programming. NCE stations do not pay broadcast license fees for their non-profit uses of the radio spectrum. Stations which are almost always operated as NCE include public broadcasting, community radio, and college radio, as well as many religious broadcasting stations. Nearly all non-commercial radio stations derive their support from listener support, grants and endowments, such as the Corporation for Public Broadcasting (CPB) that distributed supporting funds provided by Congress to support public radio.

== Organization ==
Organized radio broadcasting was introduced in the United States in the early 1920s. Although from the start there were stations operated by educational institutions, initially, there was not a separate license classification or reserved frequencies for them.

By the 1930s, the Federal Communications Commission (FCC) began to issue licenses for higher transmitting frequencies between roughly 25 and 44 MHz. These stations were informally known as "Apex" stations, due to the height of their transmitter antennas, which were needed because coverage was primarily limited to local line-of-sight distances. Like standard broadcasting stations, Apex stations used amplitude modulation (AM) transmissions. In October 1937, the FCC announced a sweeping allocation of frequency assignments, that included a broadcast band consisting of 75 channels with 40 kHz separations, and spanning from 41.02 to 43.98 MHz. This was also the first allocation where the FCC formally designated non-commercial stations. In January 1938, the band's first 25 channels, from 41.02 to 41.98 MHz, were reserved for non-commercial educational stations. Three Apex educational stations were ultimately licensed: WBOE in Cleveland, Ohio, WBKY in Beattyville, Kentucky, and WCNY in Brooklyn, New York.

In 1941, the Apex stations were replaced by the establishment of the original FM band, which initially consisted of 40 channels spanning 42–50 MHz., with the first 5 channels reserved for educational stations. The current FM broadcast band was established in 1945 and it reserves the lowest 20 channels, 201–220 (88.1–91.9 MHz) for NCE stations only. This is known as the reserved band, sometimes known by the term "left of the dial" (taken from the Replacements' song of the same name), which refers to the college and other non-commercial stations that broadcast from those frequencies. It also includes channel 200 (87.9 MHz), but only for class D NCE stations unable to find another frequency. The frequency has been unused for its intended purpose in the United States since KSFH shut down in 2021.

Many of the reserved-band channels are used by stations bordering the United States, such as with broadcasting in the San Diego/Tijuana metropolitan area. Additionally, neither the Canadian Radio-television and Telecommunications Commission nor Mexico's Federal Telecommunications Institute have such a reserved band. (In Mexico, individual stations belonging to state and federal governments, educational institutions, and non-profit groups are licensed under permits or permisos, which are non-commercial, non-profit licenses that do not permit advertising. Canada, in practice, generally keeps most of the U.S. NCE band as noncommercial or with limited advertising based on each individual license, but there are exceptions, such as CIXL, a fully commercial station that operates on 91.7.)

NCE stations may also operate on a non-reserved channel. However this was rare in the United States due to the high cost of buying a commercial broadcasting station, and because for years, the FCC failed to maintain a process that would ensure that non-commercial applicants would have a chance against those who could afford to bid at spectrum auctions. Two such stations are WGPB FM in Rome, Georgia, and WNGH-FM in Chatsworth, Georgia, former commercial stations purchased in 2007 and 2008 and operated by Georgia Public Broadcasting (GPB), serving the mountains northwest of Atlanta which previously had no GPB radio service. In addition, there were at least four stations with commercial licenses that formerly operated as PBS member stations (WNYC-TV in New York City, WMHX in Albany, New York, KAUT-TV in Oklahoma City, and KCPQ-TV in Seattle are a few examples of this); most of those stations now broadcast as affiliates of commercially owned networks. This is also rare in Mexico, though XEIMT-TV, a cultural channel in Mexico City, and XEWH-TV, the main station of the state network of Sonora, operate under commercial concessions and not permits. A number of new low power FM (LPFM) NCE stations operating in the non-reserved part of the spectrum have been licensed by the FCC since the Local Community Radio Act was enacted in 2010.

== Definition of "commercial" ==
The FCC defines several different activities as being commercial in nature. Sponsorship of NCE stations is called underwriting, and stations may make announcements of these grants on-air. However, they may not accept money for such mentions, only goods and services, unless the sponsor itself is a non-profit, such as a charitable organization or public college. Money can be accepted if there is no on-air mention of the sponsor. NCE stations may also not mention prices or qualities of commercial products or services in any situation which would be construed as promoting or endorsing any company, regardless of whether it sponsors the station.

Underwriting spots are brief and to-the-point, as they must not be disruptive to programming. Additionally, underwriting spots on public TV are at the beginning or end of the TV show rather than in the middle, as they have increasingly become on commercial stations.

Retransmission consent has often been chosen over must-carry by the major commercial television networks. Under the present rules, a new agreement is negotiated every three years, and stations must choose must-carry or retransmission consent for each cable system they wish their signal to be carried on. Non-commercial stations (such as local PBS stations) may not seek retransmission consent and may only invoke must-carry status.

== Multichannel obligations ==
Like commercial stations, NCE stations are allowed to lease subcarriers in exchange for money, essentially making the station a common carrier. This may be for a commercial audio, video, or data service, or a non-commercial one like a radio reading service for the blind.

NCE stations broadcasting in digital TV or HD Radio may lease part of their throughput in a similar manner, however, the commercial use is limited. The main program must always be non-commercial, and must not have its quality diminished excessively by increased lossy compression done in order to fit the auxiliary service within the allowable bit rate. NCE digital television (DTV) stations do not pay the FCC a percentage of their revenue from these leases as commercial DTV stations do. No such datacasting fee is levied on any analog or FM/AM station, whether commercial or NCE.

== See also ==
- Educational television
