= WSEM =

Donalsonville, Georgia; United States
- Frequency: 1500 kHz

Programming
- Format: Defunct

Ownership
- Owner: Flint Media, Inc.

History
- First air date: 1963

Technical information
- Facility ID: 59662
- Class: D
- Power: 1,000 watts day
- Transmitter coordinates: 31°4′26.00″N 84°52′47.00″W

WSEM (1500 AM) was a radio station broadcasting a contemporary Christian format, simulcasting WMGR 930 AM Bainbridge, Georgia. It was licensed to Donalsonville, Georgia, United States. The station was last owned by Flint Media, Inc.

== History ==
On January 1, 2017, WSEM changed their format from classic hits to contemporary Christian. Flint Media turned in the station's license for cancellation on December 5, 2019, and the Federal Communications Commission cancelled WSEM's license on December 9, 2019.
