= WTHG =

Radio station in Georgia, United States

Coordinates: 31.855°N 81.741°W

Hinesville, Georgia; United States
- Broadcast area: Savannah metropolitan area
- Frequency: 104.7 MHz
- Branding: 104.7 The Hawk

Programming
- Format: Classic hits, classic and southern rock

Ownership
- Owner: WRGO-FM Radio, LLC

History
- First air date: July 1991
- Former call signs: WSEU (1991); WHVL (1991–2002); WSGA (2002–2006)
- Call sign meaning: A variation of its slogan, "The Hawk"

Technical information
- Licensing authority: FCC
- Facility ID: 7816
- Class: C3
- ERP: 12,000 watts
- HAAT: 143 meters (469 ft)

Links
- Public license information: Public file; LMS
- Webcast: Listen live
- Website: 1047thehawk.com

WTHG (104.7 FM) is a commercial radio station licensed to Hinesville, Georgia, United States, and serving the Savannah metropolitan area. It airs a classic hits format that includes classic rock and southern rock, branded "The Hawk". It is owned by WRGO-FM Radio, LLC, with studios on White Bluff Road in Savannah.

WTHG's transmitter is sited on County Line Road near Dawson Road in Hinesville.

== History ==
The station signed on the air in July 1991 as WSEU. In 1991, it switched to WHVL and in 2002, the call letters became WSGA. In 2006, the call sign changed to WTHG.

The station aired an adult hits format, known as "Freedom 104.7." The Freedom format moved to 92.3 WSGA, while 104.7 changed to a classic hits format known as "104.7 The Hawk" in late April 2006. In December 2008, the format changed to adult contemporary music with the slogan "The Greatest Hits of the 1960s, '70s, '80s and Today". Several years later, it transitioned back to classic hits with a classic rock and Southern rock lean.

FM 104.7 also spent time as a sports radio station as "104.7 The Fan." It also played urban contemporary music as "Phat 104.7".

On March 13, 2009, Tama Broadcasting sold WTHG to WRGO-FM Radio, LLC, doing business as Savannah Radio. WTHG is WRGO-FM Radio's first foray into the Savannah market.
