= WACG-FM =

- Augusta, Georgia; United States
- Frequency: 90.7 MHz (HD Radio)
- Branding: Georgia Public Broadcasting

Programming
- Format: Public radio
- Subchannels: HD2: Classical "GPB Classical"
- Affiliations: National Public Radio; American Public Media; Public Radio Exchange

Ownership
- Owner: Georgia Public Broadcasting; (Georgia Public Telecommunications Commission)

History
- First air date: June 2, 1970

Technical information
- Licensing authority: FCC
- Facility ID: 23922
- Class: C2
- ERP: 3,700 watts
- HAAT: 420.8 meters (1,380.6 ft)
- Transmitter coordinates: 33°24′18.5″N 81°50′14.4″W

Links
- Public license information: Public file; LMS
- Webcast: Stream
- Website: gpb.org

WACG-FM (90.7 FM) is a radio station licensed to Augusta, Georgia. The station is owned by Georgia Public Broadcasting, and is an affiliate of GPB's radio network. WACG-FM began broadcasting June 2, 1970, and was originally owned by Augusta College.
