= WJTP =

Lithia Springs, Georgia; United States
- Broadcast area: Atlanta metro area
- Frequency: 890 kHz (AM)

Programming
- Format: Defunct

Ownership
- Owner: James Su; (Major Radio, LLC)

History
- First air date: April 15, 1959; 66 years ago (as 1460 WGOG in Walhalla, South Carolina)
- Last air date: September 30, 2022; 3 years ago
- Former call signs: WGOG (1959–2002); WSSW (2002); WSMW (2002–2003); WWOF (2003–2008)
- Former frequencies: 1460 kHz (1959–1965); 1000 kHz (1965–2008)

Technical information
- Facility ID: 2464
- Class: D
- Power: 5,000 watts days only
- Transmitter coordinates: 33°45′39.00″N 84°28′42.00″W

WJTP (890 kHz) was an AM radio station licensed to Lithia Springs, Georgia, and served the Atlanta metropolitan area. The station was last owned by James Su.

WJTP shared the same frequency as Class A clear channel station WLS AM 890 in Chicago. WJTP was a daytimer and was required to be off the air at night when radio waves travel farther. The transmitter site, shared with AM 1380 WAOK, was on Chalmers Drive NW in Atlanta, near the Ralph David Abernathy Freeway (Interstate 20).

== History ==
=== Origins ===
On April 15, 1959, the station signed on as WGOG, broadcasting from Walhalla, South Carolina, on 1460 kHz. WGOG was owned by Oconee Broadcasting. On June 16, 1965, WGOG switched its frequency to 1000 kHz (a frequency used for clear channel radio). In 1984, Oconee Broadcasting sold WGOG to Luzanne Griffith, who was the station's Traffic Manager and Receptionist. Griffith established WGOG-FM in 1991.

On April 1, 2002, WGOG was sold to Georgia-Carolina Radiocasting, changing its call sign to WSSW. On April 18, 2002, the station changed its call sign to WSMW. Then, on September 25, 2003, it changed to WWOF.

=== Move to Atlanta ===
On June 26, 2008, Tugart Properties, LLC sold WWOF to New Life Broadcasting and was cleared to move into the Atlanta market area on its new frequency 890 kHz. On October 10, 2008, WWOF changed to WJTP. The station began broadcasting from its new facility in Lithia Springs, Georgia, on January 25, 2009, with a Spanish Christian format.

On June 30, 2012, the station's license was transferred from New Life Broadcasting to National Broadcasting, Inc. The two companies share common ownership. In October 2013, WJTP was sold to James Su's Major Radio, LLC for $2.1 million. The sale was consummated on December 23, 2013.

On September 30, 2022, Major Radio, LLC notified the Federal Communications Commission that it was surrendering the station's license. The station's license was cancelled on October 3, 2022.
