= WGTV =

Television station in Athens, Georgia, United States

- Athens–Atlanta, Georgia; United States
- City: Athens, Georgia
- Channels: Digital: 7 (VHF); Virtual: 8
- Branding: GPB PBS

Programming
- Network: Georgia Public Broadcasting
- Affiliations: 8.1: GPB/PBS; 8.2: Create; 8.3: GPB Knowledge; 8.4: PBS Kids

Ownership
- Owner: Georgia Public Broadcasting; (Georgia Public Telecommunications Commission)
- Sister stations: WABW-TV, WACS-TV, WCES-TV, WJSP-TV, WMUM-TV, WNGH-TV, WVAN-TV, WXGA-TV

History
- First air date: May 23, 1960
- Former call signs: WPBS (March 2–22, 1984)
- Former channel numbers: Analog: 8 (VHF, 1960–2009); Digital: 12 (VHF, 2007–2009); 8 (VHF, 2009–2020)
- Former affiliations: NET (1960–1970)
- Call sign meaning: Georgia Television

Technical information
- Licensing authority: FCC
- Facility ID: 23948
- ERP: 62 kW
- HAAT: 327.2 m (1,073 ft)
- Transmitter coordinates: 33°48′18″N 84°8′40″W
- Translator(s): W23EV-D 23 Carrollton; W28EW-D 28 Toccoa

Links
- Public license information: Public file; LMS
- Website: www.gpb.org

WGTV (channel 8) is a PBS member television station licensed to Athens, Georgia, United States, a legacy of the station's early years as a service of the University of Georgia (UGA). Owned by the Georgia Public Telecommunications Commission (technically under the Georgia Board of Regents, along with the University System of Georgia), it is the flagship station of the statewide Georgia Public Broadcasting (GPB) television network, serving the Atlanta metropolitan area from a transmitter atop Stone Mountain just east of Atlanta.

WGTV has been part of GPB proper since January 1, 1982, after the state government ordered the consolidation of the two broadcasting entities. It was a separate entity owned by UGA for its first 22 years, though it supplied much of the non-instructional programming seen on the state's educational network.

== History ==
WGTV began broadcasting on May 23, 1960. It was licensed to the University of Georgia and operated out of the Georgia Center for Continuing Education. Channel 8 had been placed in Athens by the 1952 Sixth Report and Order, which ended the TV freeze of 1948 and revised the table of television station allotments nationally; it had previously been in Atlanta, used by WSB-TV on channel 8 and then by its facility successor WLTV, which moved to channel 11 as a result of the order in 1953.

While WGTV was a separate station from the Atlanta-based Georgia Educational TV Network, which had transmitters in the rest of the state, WGTV provided all of the non-instructional evening programming that aired on its transmitters. WGTV moved its transmitter to Stone Mountain in 1969, adding Atlanta to its coverage area; the university had desired for channel 8 to be receivable in the state capital since 1958.

In November 1980, Governor George Busbee proposed the consolidation of WGTV with the state's network of transmitters into a new Georgia Public Telecommunications Council and also called for said body to negotiate to buy Atlanta's public television station, WETV, from the Atlanta Board of Education. The Georgia state senate approved the bill, but it stalled in the House of Representatives due to the objections of Athens-area members and those involved with the UGA station. After the legislative session ended, Governor Busbee revived the proposal by executive order. On January 1, 1982, the new council took operational control of WGTV, and the combined service rebranded as Georgia Public Television; by June 1982, after the expiration of remaining program contracts, WGTV was fully incorporated into the network, and UGA's role was reduced to program supplier.

== Technical information ==
=== Analog-to-digital conversion ===
WGTV shut down its analog signal, over VHF channel 8, on February 17, 2009, at 11:59 p.m., to conclude the federally mandated transition from analog to digital television. The station's digital signal relocated from its pre-transition VHF channel 12 to channel 8. The station played the original sign-off video with outdoor scenes around Georgia set to the tune of "Georgia On My Mind" before permanently ceasing transmission. A final message at the end of the video read "Presented in fond remembrance of the analog broadcast era on Georgia Public Broadcasting." The transition to digital ended nearly 49 years of analog broadcasting by WGTV.

WGTV's analog signal was the strongest of the GPB TV network, covering most of the northern part of Georgia, extending in about a 75-mile (121 km) radius from the transmitter site. WGTV's digital/HDTV facility began broadcasting on December 20, 2007, on channel 12. However, it was at very low power, unable to be received through much (if not most) of metro Atlanta. It moved from channel 12 to full power on channel 8 after the analog shutdown in February 2009, using the same digital transmitter re-tuned to use the channel 8 antenna. This selection, made without conflict in the first-round digital channel election, is due to WDEF-TV in Chattanooga opting to stay digital on channel 12. WGTV was originally assigned channel 22 for DTV operations, but requested the frequency allotment change to channel 12 by the FCC.

The analog station had an effective radiated power (ERP) of 316 kilowatts (the maximum for high VHF), at 326 meters (1,070 ft) height above average terrain (HAAT). The temporary digital station had an ERP of only 16 kW at 304 meters (997 ft). The previous 21 kW and current 17.3 kW are still well below the limit of 63 kW for digital stations on high VHF (channels 7 to 13), which would also be legally equivalent to what it had on analog. Because of this, reception is still difficult in much of metro Atlanta. This was expected to improve once the station changed to physical channel 7 in 2020, after May 1 (when other stations in phase 9 finish) but no later than July 3 (the end of phase 10, the final phase of the national repacking of all stations to below channel 37). The omnidirectional signal will increase to 62 kW toward the north-northwest with a directional antenna, but areas south and southeast of a line from Carrollton to Athens will not see an improvement in signal strength. The lowest signal strengths (18 kW) will be in slight nulls toward the southwest (to protect Alabama Public Television station WCIQ TV 7) and toward the east. Despite the channel change at noon on July 3, the station is still difficult to receive, as it has actually dropped to 17.3 kW under special temporary authority (STA), which expires at the end of 2020. The temporary antenna model listed is different from both the old channel 8 antenna and the channel 7 model listed in its permit, but all are at the same height, indicating that the old antenna must be removed before the new permanent one can be installed, tested, and switched over to for full-power operation.

=== Translator ===
- W28EW-D Toccoa
