= WJYI (FM) =

WPLH
- Tifton, Georgia; United States
- Frequency: 88.3 MHz

Programming
- Format: Variety

Ownership
- Owner: Abraham Baldwin Agricultural College

History
- First air date: August 2022
- Former call signs: WABR-FM (1974–1988); WPLH (1988–2022)
- Former frequencies: 90.5 MHz & 103.1 MHz

Technical information
- Licensing authority: FCC
- Facility ID: 317
- Class: D
- ERP: 265 watts
- HAAT: 70.0 meters
- Transmitter coordinates: 31°28′51.00″N 83°31′38.00″W

Links
- Public license information: Public file; LMS

WPLH (88.3 FM) is a college radio station broadcasting a Variety format. Licensed to Tifton, Georgia, United States, the station is owned by Abraham Baldwin Agricultural College (ABAC). It is funded, managed and operated by students with the assistance of a faculty advisor.

== History ==
The station went on the air as WABR-FM in 1974. On June 1, 1988, the station changed its call sign to WPLH. The WABR call letters were transferred to a new Peach State Radio transmitter at 91.1 MHz. The tower for the new, higher-power public radio station was intended to be built on University of Georgia property, but a surveying error placed the site on an ABAC pasture and, with FCC and FAA approval already secured, it had to be built on college property.

In the FCC non-commercial stations filing window of 2021, ABAC received a construction permit for a new 265-watt station at 88.3 MHz. The WJYI call sign was temporarily assigned to the construction permit and then switched to WPLH on August 3, 2022, as WPLH's programming moved to the higher-power facility.
