= WSYL =

Sylvania, Georgia; United States
- Frequency: 1490 kHz

Programming
- Format: Defunct
- Affiliations: Jones Radio Network, Motor Racing Network

Ownership
- Owner: Neal Ardman; (NIA Broadcasting, Inc.)

History
- First air date: 1955
- Call sign meaning: W SYLvania, Georgia (city of license)

Technical information
- Licensing authority: FCC
- Facility ID: 58752
- Class: C
- Power: 1,000 watts unlimited
- Transmitter coordinates: 32°43′51.00″N 81°37′4.00″W

Links
- Public license information: Public file; LMS

WSYL (1490 AM) was a radio station owned by Neal Ardman, through licensee NIA Broadcasting, Inc.

== License renewal hearing and cancellation ==
On March 9, 2021, the Federal Communications Commission designated the station's license renewal for hearing due to being silent for 73 percent of the last three years, including 270 days in 2019 during which the station operated at reduced power without FCC approval. On March 29, 2021, the FCC released a statement saying the hearing would be terminated with prejudice because of NIA Broadcasting's decision to cancel the license for WSYL.
