= WUFF-FM =

Radio station in Eastman, Georgia

WUFF-FM and WUFF

Eastman, Georgia; United States
- Frequencies: WUFF-FM: 97.5 MHz; WUFF: 710 kHz
- Branding: Wolf Country 97.5

Programming
- Format: Country music
- Affiliations: Westwood One

Ownership
- Owner: Dodge Broadcasting, Inc.

History
- First air date: WUFF-FM: January 25, 1978; WUFF: February 14, 1962
- Former call signs: WUFF: WPFE (1961–1970s)
- Former frequencies: WUFF-FM: 92.1 MHz (1978–1992)

Technical information
- Licensing authority: FCC
- Facility ID: WUFF-FM: 21211; WUFF: 21212
- Class: WUFF-FM: A; WUFF: D
- Power: WUFF: 2,500 watts (day)
- ERP: WUFF-FM: 4,620 watts
- HAAT: WUFF-FM: 113 m (371 ft)
- Transmitter coordinates: WUFF-FM: 32°13′18.6″N 83°13′3.6″W; WUFF: 32°13′18″N 83°13′4″W

Links
- Public license information: WUFF-FM: Public file; LMS; WUFF: Public file; LMS
- Website: wolfcountry975.com

WUFF-FM (97.5 MHz) and WUFF (710 AM) are simulcast commercial radio stations in Eastman, Georgia, United States. Big WUFF's studios are located at 731 College Street in Eastman.

== History ==
The first commercial radio station in Eastman, Georgia was licensed to O'Quinn Broadcasting and hit the airwaves in September 1961. The frequency was 1580 AM, and the callsign was WPFE, or "We Pull For Eastman".

Broadcasting power and coverage area were expanded in the 1970s. The call letters were changed to WUFF (Wake Up For Fun), and the company became known as Big WUFF Radio. WUFF began AM/FM simulcasting. The AM frequency changed to 710, and the FM frequency 92.1 was added. For many years, Big WUFF Radio was primarily a pop/rock station, but there was something for everyone. Country and especially gospel music were driving forces in the market.

=== 1992–present ===
In 1992, WUFF-FM changed frequencies from 92.1 to 97.5 MHz and increased its broadcasting power and coverage area.

In late 1997, Big WUFF began broadcasting 24 hours a day. Previously, the stations went off the air between the hours of 11 p.m. and 6 a.m.

In 2004, Steve Sellars purchased WUFF-AM-FM from Farnell O'Quinn for $450,000. In 2006, the station increased its broadcasting power and coverage area once again and began broadcasting in stereo.

In May 2007, long time morning show host Buddy Leach left WUFF radio. Greg Grantham stepped in as morning man and Stephen B as afternoon host. Chris Screws worked the evening shift. In September 2010, Screws debuted a new two-hour segment called Hometown Howling that features local, independent artists and bands.

In October 2010, Grantham took over the duties of station manager in addition to his other jobs as programming director, morning show host, and host of the Saturday Night Country Club.

On October 7, 2018, WUFF-FM began broadcasting Good News Gospel Music hosted by Al and Joann Dube from 3 to 7 p.m. on Sundays.

== Format and programming ==
Country music is currently the dominant musical format, except on Sunday mornings when WUFF-FM airs religious programming and gospel music.

WUFF is a supporter of high school athletics. Wolf Country 97.5 is the official home of Dodge County Indian sports. The Dodge County Indians football games are called by Dr. Clark Carroll and Dr. Emory Peacock. The station has been broadcasting the football games since the 1970s. WUFF also carries the broadcasts of boys and girls basketball games once the playoffs begin each season. Dodge County Indians baseball games have been broadcast exclusively on WUFF since the 2009 season by Quint Bush. In the Fall of 2010, WUFF began broadcasting Lady Indians softball games with broadcasting duties shared by Susan Peacock Southerland, Quint Bush, and Steve Harrison.
