= WGPB =

- Rome, Georgia; United States
- Broadcast area: Northwest Georgia
- Frequency: 97.7 MHz

Programming
- Format: Public broadcasting
- Affiliations: NPR/PRX/American Public Media

Ownership
- Owner: Georgia Public Broadcasting; (Georgia Public Telecommunications Commission)
- Sister stations: WGTV

History
- First air date: May 22, 1965 (as WROM-FM)
- Call sign meaning: Georgia Public Broadcasting

Technical information
- Licensing authority: FCC
- Facility ID: 6797
- Class: C3
- ERP: 4,200 watts
- HAAT: 241 meters (791 ft)
- Transmitter coordinates: 34°14′5.3″N 85°13′47.8″W
- Translator: 92.1 W221CG (Kennesaw)

Links
- Public license information: Public file; LMS
- Webcast: Listen Live
- Website: www.GPB.org

WGPB FM 97.7 is a public radio station in Rome, Georgia. It is part of the Georgia Public Broadcasting radio network, a state network which in turn is a member of National Public Radio, Public Radio Exchange, and American Public Media. Unlike most stations on the GPB network, WGPB does not completely simulcast with the network. WGPB also produces its own programs. The studios are located at the James D. Maddox Heritage Hall on Georgia Highlands College's Heritage Hall campus on East 3rd Avenue in downtown Rome, from which locally produced programming originates. The station began broadcasting as WGPB at 5 AM on June 30, 2006.

== History ==
The station began broadcasting May 22, 1965 as WROM-FM, sister station to WROM AM 710. It had that callsign until November 1979 when it became WKCX, known as "K98", most recently with a hot adult contemporary format. A satellite-delivered format was used during most of the broadcast day, except for mornings and afternoons. The station was previously owned by Mills Fitzner, who owned WKCX for 20 years under the name Briar Creek Broadcasting Corp.

=== Format and callsign change ===
In 2006, WKCX was sold to Georgia Public Broadcasting, with the format changed from hot adult contemporary, to public broadcasting. The deal was announced in March 2006, and was finalized after a 45-day waiting period on June 29, one day before GPB began broadcasting on the frequency. Most of WKCX's staff left the station on May 31 in preparation for the changeover. The station began broadcasting as WGPB at 5 AM on June 30, 2006.

=== Coverage ===
WGPB is the first GPB or NPR radio station in northwest Georgia, and covers all of Floyd and about half of each neighboring county reliably. The only other NPR/PRI stations available are WABE FM 90.1 from Atlanta, and WUTC FM 88.1 and WSMC-FM 90.5 from Chattanooga, both of which have marginal to poor reception in the Rome area. GPB Radio is also usually available on the second audio program of GPB TV station WNGH-TV 18, from near Chatsworth, except for when WNGH is using the SAP channel for other uses.

The station broadcasts with a power of 4,200 watts at 241 meters (791 ft) HAAT, and is class C3. Despite what seems like a low effective radiated power, its height makes it approximately equivalent to the class C3 maximum of 25,000 watts at 100 meters, which gives a reference distance of nearly 40 km or 25 miles from the radio antenna site. This is the first GPB station, and one of the few non-commercial educational stations in the country, that use a channel outside of the 88-92 MHz reserved band. WQMT FM 98.9 in Chatsworth was purchased under similar circumstances for $3.2 million and switched to GPB programming on January 2, 2008 as WNGH-FM. Both stations have a single station ID done together each hour and heard on both stations, indicating they use the same feed.

In early February 2013, GPB applied to the FCC to move the station eastward, which would reduce coverage in northeast Alabama and increase it in northwestern metro Atlanta, bringing Cartersville and Acworth within its protected signal contour. This would increase power from 4.2 to 17.5 kW, but decrease HAAT from 241 to 120 meters (394 ft), leaving the station with approximately the same or slightly greater coverage area, and with greater population within its broadcast range. This radio tower, just west-northwest of Kingston (34°15′3″N 84°59′5″W), has been used by WTSH-FM 107.1, which is moving south-southwest to a higher tower located west-northwest of Euharlee according to that station's construction permit. WGPB's application references two other stations in Alabama which would also be moving as the result of its signal being pulled away from that state.

== Broadcast translator ==
The station was also assigned broadcast translator W221CG FM 92.1 MHz, licensed to, but not reaching any part of, Kennesaw with 55 watts at 19 meters HAAT. It was located along Cobb Parkway (U.S. Route 41) on the north-northeast corner of Awtrey Church Road (34°3′57″N 84°43′24″W), west of Acworth and just north of SR 92, and reached as far north as the southern parts of Emerson according to FCC maps.

It was owned by Radio Assist Ministry, not GPB/GPTC, and may not have actually been airing WGPB. It has since been reassigned to relay commercial station WWWQ FM 99.7 MHz, and was sold by RAM to Cumulus Licensing, owner of WWWQ. The station was moved west-southwest in 2009 to the far exurbs between Dallas and Hiram, and had a construction permit to move between Powder Springs and Austell to serve Lithia Springs on 92.5 MHz, where it became W223BP in early 2012.
