= WMGR =

- Bainbridge, Georgia; United States
- Broadcast area: Tallahassee area
- Frequency: 930 kHz
- Branding: 99.3 Contemporary Christian Favorites

Programming
- Format: Christian Adult Contemporary
- Affiliations: Westwood One

Ownership
- Owner: Kevin Dowdy; (Flint Media Inc.)

History
- First air date: 1946
- Call sign meaning: W Marvin Griffin Radio

Technical information
- Licensing authority: FCC
- Facility ID: 52401
- Class: D
- Power: 5,000 watts day
- Transmitter coordinates: 30°54′25.00″N 84°33′0.00″W
- Translator: 99.3 W257BS (Bainbridge)

Links
- Public license information: Public file; LMS
- Website: sowegalive.com

WMGR (930 AM) is a Christian radio station broadcasting a Christian Adult Contemporary format. Licensed to Bainbridge, Georgia, United States, the station serves the Tallahassee area. The station was owned by Kevin Dowdy, through licensee Flint Media Inc. prior to purchase by Clear Channel Communications.

== History ==
WMGR was established in the late 1940s by Marvin Griffin, who later became the 72nd Governor of Georgia. The call sign was for Marvin Griffin Radio.

On January 1, 2017, WMGR changed their format from classic hits to contemporary Christian.
