= WBLY-LP =

- Sycamore, Georgia; United States
- Frequency: 101.5 MHz
- Branding: WBLY-LP

Programming
- Format: Southern Gospel/Religious

Ownership
- Owner: Bethel Baptist Church of Sycamore, Georgia, Inc.

Technical information
- Licensing authority: FCC
- Facility ID: 123596
- Class: L1
- ERP: 45 watts
- HAAT: 49 metres (161 ft)
- Transmitter coordinates: 31°39′28″N 83°34′1″W

Links
- Public license information: LMS

WBLY-LP (101.5 FM) is a Christian radio station licensed to serve the community of Sycamore, Georgia. The station is owned by Bethel Baptist Church of Sycamore, Georgia, Inc. It airs a Southern Gospel/religious format.

The station was assigned the WBLY-LP call letters by the Federal Communications Commission on June 12, 2003.
