= WSGA (FM) =

Coordinates: 31.6938°N 81.3907°W

- Hinesville, Georgia; United States
- Broadcast area: Savannah, Georgia
- Frequency: 92.3 MHz
- Branding: 92.3 Thunder Country

Programming
- Format: Country

Ownership
- Owner: Richard Pope; (WRGO-FM Radio LLC)

History
- First air date: 1982 (on 92.1)
- Former call signs: WBLU (1982–1989); WXLQ (1989–1991); WSKX (1991–2003); WSSJ (2003–2006)
- Former frequencies: 92.1 MHz (1982–1991)
- Call sign meaning: W Savannah GeorgiA

Technical information
- Facility ID: 64428
- Class: C2
- ERP: 50,000 watts
- HAAT: 147 meters (482 ft)

Links
- Webcast: Listen Live
- Website: 923thundercountry.com

WSGA (92.3 FM), known as "92.3 Thunder Country", is a country music radio station targeted towards Savannah, Georgia. It is owned by Richard Pope, through licensee WRGO-FM Radio LLC. The call sign and format were on its sister station WTHG, which flipped to a classic rock format in late April 2006. On March 31, 2008, 92.3 flipped from "Freedom 92-3".

WSGA is unique because it was the first station in the Savannah market to flip to the expanding variety-hits format. Within a couple of months, competitor "Oldies 98.3" was changed to a variety-hits format as "98.3 Jack FM". WGCO has a much better signal towards Savannah, so there had been little enthusiasm for WSGA. On March 16, 2007, WGCO reverted to its previous incarnation as "Oldies 98.3" (like WCBS-FM did that same year). On September 24, 2007, WGCO again changed formats to a mostly 1970s song mix as "BIG 98".

In March 2006, FM station 104.7 changed its calls to WTHG and its format to classic rock as 104.7 The Hawk, with the WSGA calls moving to the 92.3 frequency. This meant a move of the current format to 92.3, with 92.3's current smooth jazz format moving to "100.1, WSSJ-FM". FM 100.1 was formerly a Statesboro Hot Adult Contemporary station known as "FM 100, WMCD".

On September 4, 2010, WSGA dropped its 1980s-1990s format for an Adult Top 40 format with emphasis on currents.

On October 10, 2011, WSGA changed their format to classic country, branded as "Classic Country 92.3".

On January 25, 2014, WSGA shifted their format to country, branded as "92.3 Thunder Country".

== History ==
The station originally signed on in 1982 as a 3 kW class A station on 92.1 with the call sign WBLU (known as Blu 92). In late 1988 the station became urban as WSKQ (Q-92.1). The station upgraded to 50 kW and moved to 92.3 in 1991. After the power upgrade, the station was sold and renamed Power 92. The station became Hot AC as WSKX-FM (Xtra 92.3) in the mid-1990s.

== See also ==
- List of radio stations in Georgia (U.S. state)
- Georgia (U.S. state)
- Lists of radio stations in North and Central America
