= Georgia Public Broadcasting =

PBS/NPR member network in Georgia, United States

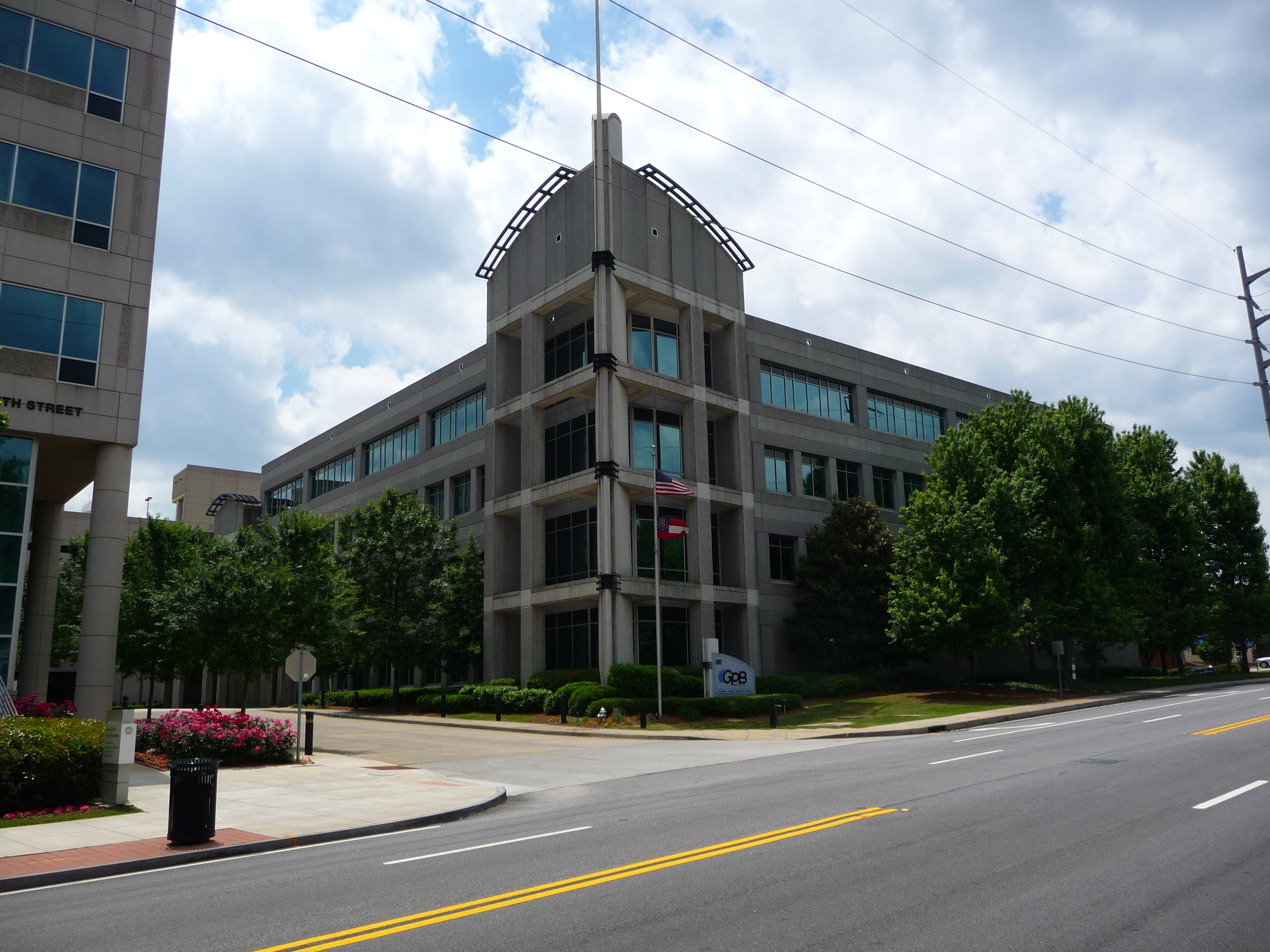
- GPB offices in midtown Atlanta
- Type: Non-commercial educational broadcast television and radio network
- Branding: GPB
- Country: United States
- Availability: Georgia (statewide); northern Florida; eastern Alabama; southeast Tennessee; southwestern North Carolina; northern and western South Carolina
- Founded: 1960 (66 years ago) by the University of Georgia
- TV stations: See § Television stations
- TV transmitters: 9
- Radio stations: See § Radio stations
- Headquarters: 260 14th Street NW; Atlanta, Georgia; 30318
- Owner: Georgia Public Telecommunications Commission
- Parent: State of Georgia
- Key people: Bert Wesley Huffman (CEO)
- Launch date: May 23, 1960 (66 years ago)
- Picture format: 480i (SDTV) (1960–2008); 1080i (HDTV) (2008–present)
- Affiliations: TV: PBS, APT; Radio: NPR, APM, PRX
- Former affiliations: TV: NET (1960–1970)
- Official website: www.gpb.org
- Notes

Georgia Public Broadcasting (GPB) is a state network of PBS member television stations and NPR member radio stations serving the U.S. state of Georgia. It is operated by the Georgia Public Telecommunications Commission, an agency of the Georgia state government which holds the licenses for most of the PBS and NPR member stations licensed in the state. The broadcast signals of the nine television stations and 19 radio stations cover almost all of the state, as well as parts of Alabama, Florida, North Carolina, South Carolina and Tennessee.

The network's headquarters and primary radio and television production facilities are located on 14th Street in Midtown Atlanta, just west of the Downtown Connector in the Home Park neighborhood. The facility and GPB are also a major part of Georgia's film and television industry, and in addition to commercial production occurring at the GPB facilities, some production companies also rent production offices from GPB.

== History ==
=== Establishing the network ===
On May 23, 1960, the University of Georgia signed on WGTV, the second educational television station in Georgia (after Atlanta's WETV, later WPBA, now WABE-TV). From 1960 to 1964, in a separate initiative, the Georgia Board of Education launched four educational television stations across the state, aimed at providing in-school instruction. This evolved into the Georgia Educational Television Network, which aired Board of Education-produced classes for schools and evening programming from WGTV. WGTV moved its transmitter to Stone Mountain in 1969, adding Atlanta to its coverage area.

In November 1980, Governor George Busbee proposed the consolidation of WGTV with the state's network of transmitters into a new Georgia Public Telecommunications Council and also called for said body to negotiate to buy WETV from the Atlanta Board of Education. The Georgia state senate approved the bill, but it stalled in the House of Representatives due to the objections of Athens-area members and those involved with the UGA station. After the legislative session ended, Governor Busbee revived the proposal by executive order. On January 1, 1982, the new council took operational control of WGTV, and the combined service rebranded as Georgia Public Television; by June 1982, after the expiration of remaining program contracts, WGTV was fully incorporated into the network, and UGA's role was reduced to program supplier.

=== Growth into radio ===
In February 1985, the GPTC entered into public radio, launching stations serving Macon, Columbus and Valdosta in the first year. These formed the nuclei of Peach State Public Radio, which provided the first public radio services to much of Georgia; previously, only Atlanta and Savannah had public stations. During the 1980s and 1990s, stations that had been operated by other educational institutions and community groups became affiliated with the network. The service was renamed Georgia Public Radio in 2001.

In 1995, the GPTC began using "Georgia Public Broadcasting" as its corporate name. This would eventually become the umbrella title for all GPB operations in January 2004, when GPTV and Georgia Public Radio simultaneously rebranded under the Georgia Public Broadcasting name.

=== New studios and new scandals ===
The late 1990s were a time of political scandal for GPB. In 1997, the agency used Georgia Lottery funds earmarked for technology to build its present facility in Midtown, later cited as one of several unnecessary projects using lottery monies. Financial mismanagement led Governor Roy Barnes in 1999 to oust the executive director, Vernon Rogers, and board of directors, appointing longtime state auditor Claude Vickers to turn around a three-year deficit nearing $7 million. The ouster of Rogers came after an audit revealed that the agency had a stack of accounts receivable, the oldest of them 12 years old; a bank loan that the Georgia legislature never approved; and had misplaced $1 million in equipment. Under Vickers, GPB cut expenses by $5.2 million without cutting radio or television program production and had its first positive audit in six years.

As the audiovisual industry has grown in Georgia, GPB studios have been used for the production of commercial television programming. The studio facilities were used for the production of the first season of the CBS Television Distribution-syndicated program Swift Justice with Nancy Grace; production of that series was moved to Los Angeles for its second and final season, with a new judge under the new name Swift Justice with Jackie Glass. In 2014, another syndicated court show, Lauren Lake's Paternity Court, began using the GPB facilities under the same arrangement; in 2017, it was joined by Couples Court with the Cutlers.

GPB is an agency under the oversight of the governor, which has led to concerns of political connections in the broadcasting operation. In 2012, the director of the agency hired state senator Chip Rogers to host a program on a direct recommendation from Nathan Deal; the arrangement was panned by former NPR president Vivian Schiller and seen as a way to land the politician in a favorable position. Rogers was let go from GPB in 2014.

== GPB Television ==
GPB Television broadcasts PBS programming and statewide programs produced specifically for the GPB network 24 hours a day on a network of nine full-power stations as well as numerous low-power translator stations (especially in the state's mountainous northeastern counties). Certain programs broadcast by GPB Television (mainly those provided by PBS) feature a Descriptive Video Service track that is audible over the second audio program (SAP) channel of each station; GPB Radio feeds could previously be heard during times when DVS-transcribed programs were not airing, prior to the 2009 digital television transition. All stations within the GPB Television network act as rebroadcasters, simulcasting the network's programming at all times. GPB-produced programs include Gardening in Georgia, Georgia Backroads, Georgia's Business, Georgia Outdoors and Georgia Traveler, as well as annual coverage of the Georgia General Assembly when it is in legislative session early in the year. Live coverage of the football and basketball championship games from the Georgia High School Association is broadcast at the end of their respective seasons.

GPB Television also operates four digital subchannels that are carried on most of its stations: GPB Knowledge debuted in September 2008, but officially launched on October 1 of that year. GPB Knowledge carries programming from the World network during prime time hours, and GPB documentary and news programming (including BBC World News) at other times. It replaced GPB Education, which is still available to schools statewide on demand over the Internet. GPB Kids, launched in January 2009 as the second digital subchannel of the GPBTV stations, replacing the standard-definition feed (which mirrored each station's analog feed) of GPB's main channel. GPB Kids aired 24/7 with content from PBS Kids. During December 2008, the subchannel carried only a static station identification for all nine stations (including the GPB/PBS Kids logo), and the electronic program guide for the channel continued to show main channel information for the GPBTV stations. In March 2015, GPB Kids was replaced with Create. In January 2017, PBS Kids 24/7 was launched, being the fourth digital subchannel of the GPB TV stations.

=== Television stations ===
Each of GPB's television stations identify themselves with two locations—usually, the smaller community where the station is licensed by the Federal Communications Commission (almost always the station's transmitter location) and the larger city that it serves. The exceptions are WVAN-TV and WJSP-TV, which are actually licensed in major Georgia cities: WVAN-TV is licensed to Savannah, while WJSP-TV is licensed to Columbus. However, in order to conform to the pattern, GPB lists the locations for the stations' transmitters as the second city.

This rule only applies to the television stations, not to those on radio, which, except for two, bear only the city of license.

The GPB television stations are:

Call sign	Channel; TV (RF)	City of license (Other cities served)	FID	ERP	HAAT	Transmitter coordinates	Founded	FCC info	Call letter meaning
WABW-TV	14 (6)	Pelham (Albany)	23917	10.5 kW	378 m (1,240 ft)	31°8′8.7″N 84°6′15.7″W	January 2, 1967	Public file; LMS	Bob Wright, vice chair of the State Board of Education
WACS-TV (Note: WACS-TV was off-air from March 1, 2007 to April or May 2008, due to a radio tower collapse caused by a tornado.)	25 (7)	Dawson (Americus)	23930	26.3 kW	336.2 m (1,103.0 ft)	31°56′12.4″N 84°33′12.8″W	March 6, 1967	Public file; LMS	Americus
WCES-TV	20 (6)	Wrens (Augusta)	23937	7.9 kW	426 m (1,398 ft)	33°15′33″N 82°17′7.4″W	September 12, 1966	Public file; LMS	Then-Governor Carl E. Sanders
WGTV (Note: WGTV changed its call sign to WPBS on March 2, 1984, then reverted it back to WGTV 20 days later.)	8 (7)	Athens (Atlanta)	23948	62 kW	327.2 m (1,073.5 ft)	33°48′18″N 84°8′40″W	May 23, 1960	Public file; LMS	"Georgia Television"
WJSP-TV	28 (5)	Columbus (Warm Springs)	23918	21.4 kW	431.5 m (1,415.7 ft)	32°51′6.8″N 84°42′5.5″W	August 10, 1964	Public file; LMS	James S. Peters, then-president of the Georgia State Board of Education
WMUM-TV (Note: At the time of its sign-on in 1968, WMUM-TV was known as WDCO-TV and broadcast on UHF channel 15; the call letters honored M. D. Collins, a former state superintendent of schools. WDCO-TV moved to channel 29 in 1990, a change paid for by the United States Air Force to avoid radar interference to the PAVE PAWS site at Robins Air Force Base, and adopted its current call letters in 2006.)	29 (9)	Cochran (Macon)	23935	126 kW	329.7 m (1,081.7 ft)	32°28′12.2″N 83°15′18″W	January 1, 1968	Public file; LMS	Mercer University Macon
WNGH-TV (Note: WNGH-TV was known as WCLP-TV from 1967 until 2008. The call letters honored Dr. Claude Lamar Purcell, who was the state superintendent of schools.)	18 (4)	Chatsworth (Dalton)	23942	11.2 kW	573.8 m (1,882.5 ft)	34°45′2.3″N 84°42′52.7″W	January 30, 1967	Public file; LMS	"North Georgia Highlands"
WVAN-TV	9 (8)	Savannah (Pembroke)	23947	36.5 kW	388.5 m (1,274.6 ft)	32°8′49″N 81°37′4″W	September 16, 1963	Public file; LMS	Former Governor Ernest Vandiver
WXGA-TV	8 (7)	Waycross (Valdosta)	23929	35.3 kW	315.1 m (1,033.8 ft)	31°13′22.8″N 82°34′40.5″W	December 4, 1961	Public file; LMS	"Waycross, Georgia" (the "X" referring to "cross")

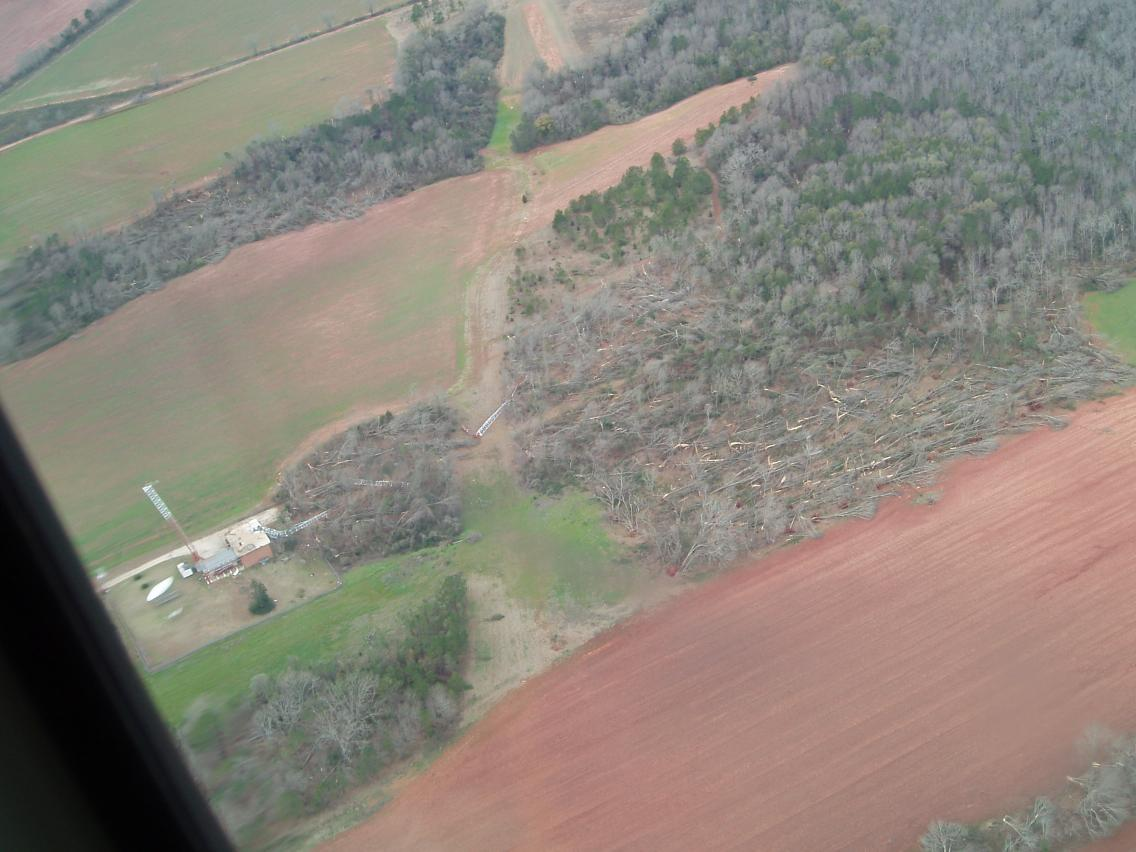
The WACS tower, seen after it was blown down in a tornado in 2007

=== Broadcast translators ===
GPB Television operates several low-power translator stations located in the hilly terrain of the north Georgia mountains. These include:

City of license	Call sign	Channel	Translating	FID	ERP	HAAT	Transmitter coordinates
Carrollton	W23EV-D	23	WJSP 28	167054	8.1 kW	152.5 m (500.3 ft)	33°33′51.6″N 85°01′03.9″W
Young Harris	W25FP-D	25	WNGH 18	23945	5 kW	687.7 m (2,256.2 ft)	34°52′27.3″N 83°48′37.6″W
Toccoa	W28EW-D	28	WGTV 7	23924	15 kW	121.5 m (398.6 ft)	34°36′32.7″N 83°21′51.2″W
Hartwell & Royston	W32FE-D	32	WCES-TV 20	23928	15 kW	134.9 m (442.6 ft)	34°18′45″N 82°56′15″W

==== Former translators ====
The following translators were abandoned by GPB, which had their licenses (and in some cases, digital applications and permits) cancelled by the FCC, apparently at GPB's request, possibly due to the expense of running and upgrading them.

City of license	Channel #	Notes
Carnesville	52 (UHF)	Signal reached parts of Franklin County in northeastern Georgia; directly repeated WGTV
Cedartown	65 (UHF)	Signal reached parts of Polk and Floyd counties in northwestern Georgia; directly repeated WNGH
Draketown	27 (UHF)	Signal reached parts of Haralson and Paulding counties in northwestern Georgia; directly repeated WNGH
Elberton	60 (UHF)	Signal reached parts of Elbert County in northeastern Georgia; directly repeated WGTV
Flintstone	51 (UHF)	Signal reached parts of Walker, Dade, and Catoosa counties in Northwestern Georgia, as well as parts of Hamilton County and Chattanooga, Tennessee; directly repeated WNGH
LaFayette	35 (UHF)	Signal reached parts of Walker and Dade counties in northwestern Georgia; directly repeated WNGH
Hiawassee	50 (UHF)	Signal reached parts of Towns and Rabun counties in northeastern Georgia, digital coverage provided by W04BJ's replacement

=== WUGA-TV ===
On December 23, 2010, the University of Georgia announced that it would enter into a programming partnership with GPB, which would provide all programming for the university-owned WNEG-TV (channel 32) in Toccoa, with most of the content coming from its GPB Knowledge subchannel. The station filed with the FCC to convert WNEG's station license to non-commercial status. The partnership between UGA and GPB was due to a reduction of advertising dollars, resulting from an economic downturn and the loss of WNEG's CBS affiliation (the station had been with CBS since August 1995, receiving affiliation as a by-product of the CBS programming moving in the adjacent Atlanta market from WAGA-TV [channel 5] to WGCL-TV [channel 46] in December 1994). At 5:30 am on May 1, 2011, the station began carrying GPB Knowledge programming; the following day, its call letters were changed to WUGA-TV. UGA sold WUGA-TV to Marquee Broadcasting in 2015; at 12:01 am on July 1, 2015, the new owners dropped all GPB Knowledge programming, changed the station's call letters to WGTA, and returned the station to commercial operation with programming from the MeTV, Heroes & Icons, Decades, and Movies! networks.

=== Digital television ===
WGTV, WXGA-TV, and WVAN-TV were the first GPB stations to begin operating their own digital television signals. The other six stations signed on their digital signals in July 2008. The ERP/HAAT figures listed within the table for those stations are based on those listed in the stations' individual FCC queries, though some of the stations were operating at low power, and only upgraded to full-power when the digital transition occurred.

=== Subchannels ===
The digital signals of GPB's TV stations are multiplexed:

GPB multiplex
Subchannel	Res.	Short name	Programming
xx.1	1080i	(call sign)	PBS
xx.2	480i	Create	Create
xx.3	480i	Knowled	GPB Knowledge
xx.4	480i	Kids	PBS Kids

All nine stations carry the same programming from each of the four channels, but channel labels differ somewhat between the stations.

==== Analog-to-digital conversion ====
The GPB Television stations shut down their analog signals on February 17, 2009, as part of the federally mandated transition from analog to digital television (which Congress had moved the previous month to June 12).

Each stations' post-transition digital allocations are as follows:

- WABW-TV shut down its analog signal, over UHF channel 14; the station's digital signal moved from its pre-transition VHF channel 5 to channel 6, using virtual channel 14.
- WACS-TV shut down its analog signal, over UHF channel 25; the station's digital signal remained on its pre-transition VHF channel 8, using virtual channel 25.
- WCES-TV shut down its analog signal, over UHF channel 20; the station's digital signal moved from its pre-transition VHF channel 2 to channel 6, using virtual channel 20.
- WGTV shut down its analog signal, over VHF channel 8; the station's digital signal relocated from its pre-transition VHF channel 12 to channel 8.
- WJSP-TV shut down its analog signal, over UHF channel 28; the station's digital signal remained on its pre-transition UHF channel 23, using virtual channel 28. The station was licensed to move its digital signal to VHF channel 5 effective April 5, 2019.
- WMUM-TV shut down its analog signal, over UHF channel 29; the station's digital signal remained on its pre-transition VHF channel 7, using virtual channel 29.
- WNGH-TV shut down its analog signal, over UHF channel 18; the station's digital signal remained on its pre-transition UHF channel 33, using virtual channel 18.
- WVAN-TV shut down its analog signal, over VHF channel 9; the station's digital signal relocated from its pre-transition VHF channel 13 to channel 9.
- WXGA-TV shut down its analog signal, over VHF channel 8; the station's digital signal relocated from its pre-transition VHF channel 9 to channel 8.

GPB has placed most of its stations on VHF due to the lower effective radiated power requirements (20 or 32 kW instead of 1000 kW), which in turn reduces the cost of purchasing the transmitter and using the electrical power for it. For WABW and WCES, this makes them one of the few television stations in the country to operate on low-band VHF channels (2 to 6), which require larger receiving antennas, are prone to tropospheric ducting (weather) and impulse noise, make mobile TV (ATSC-M/H) difficult, and for 5 and 6 are also an obstacle to expanding the FM broadcast band. The high-band VHF channels also have these problems, but not to a major extent.

== Cable and satellite availability ==
GPB Television's various stations are carried on all cable providers in Georgia (the station that is available on a given provider varies on the jurisdiction). Additionally, Savannah's WVAN is carried on cable systems on Hilton Head Island, South Carolina; Columbus' WJSP is carried on cable systems in Phenix City and Auburn, Alabama; and Augusta's WCES is carried on most cable systems in Aiken and Edgefield, South Carolina. WABW is carried on Comcast's system in Tallahassee, Florida.

On satellite, WGTV, WVAN, WCES, WJSP, WNUM, WABW, WNGH, and WXGA are carried on the Atlanta, Savannah, Augusta, Columbus, Macon, Albany, Chattanooga, and Jacksonville DirecTV and Dish Network feeds, respectively.

=== Television programs ===
==== Series ====
- Gardening in Georgia
- Georgia Outdoors
- Georgia Traveler
- Georgia's Backroads and More Georgia Backroads
- Georgia's Business
- Lawmakers
- On the Story
- Salsa

==== Specials ====
- The Day Atlanta Stood Still
- Georgia Aquarium: Keepers of the Deep
- Georgia Gazette
- Georgia Graduation Stories
- The Georgia Meth Invasion
- Georgia On My Mind
- Georgia Quilts: Stitches And Stories
- Georgia Read More
- Georgia Serenade
- Georgia Valor
- Georgia Weekly
- Georgia's Civil War
- Georgia's Historic Inns
- Historic Houses of Georgia: The Antebellum Years
- Lost Atlanta: The Way We Were
- Main Street Georgia
- Secret Seashore: Georgia's Barrier Islands (see The Golden Isles of Georgia)
- Sites to Behold: The History of Georgia's State Parks
- The South Takes Flight: 100 Years of Aviation in Georgia
- Sustainable Georgia
- The Thomas B. Murphy Story (see Tom Murphy)
- Vanishing Georgia

== GPB Radio ==
GPB Radio broadcasts 24 hours a day on several FM radio stations across the state, except in the Atlanta metropolitan area. The network had previously operated a translator station in Atlanta, W264AE (100.7 FM), which broadcast from a transmission tower located in the city's downtown district. However, it (and WGHR) was forced to go silent when full-power station WWWQ (100.5 FM, now WNNX) moved from Anniston, Alabama (where it operated under the WHMA-FM call letters) into the Atlanta market on an adjacent channel. Despite having almost no presence in metropolitan Atlanta prior to 2014, the network reaches nearly all the rest of Georgia, plus parts of Alabama, Florida, South Carolina and Tennessee. Atlanta-area listeners heard NPR programming on locally licensed stations WABE and WCLK instead.

=== WRAS-Atlanta controversy ===
On May 6, 2014, Georgia State University announced an arrangement allowing Georgia Public Broadcasting to program the university's station WRAS ("Album 88") from 5 a.m. to 7 p.m. daily, leaving 7 p.m. to 5 a.m. as the only remaining student airtime. This took effect on June 29. In exchange, GPB promised to provide internships at GPB for GSU students and other media collaborations between the two institutions, with WRAS broadcasting a separate feed from the main statewide network. The announcement immediately prompted intense opposition and denunciations from WRAS listeners, staffers, and GSU alumni, going so far as evoking a protest at GSU's commencement ceremony, a social media campaign with the tag #savewras, and a petition with more than 10,000 signatories on Change.org. Some of them have made accusations of secrecy and even illegality surrounding the transaction as they protested that the alternative rock format was unique to the Atlanta market (despite the presence of another college station in the area, WREK, licensed to the Georgia Institute of Technology) and that it was being displaced by programming that largely duplicated offerings on WABE. This has led to a public effort to boycott GPB and its underwriters.

Despite these protests, the network announced plans to increase news and talk programming later in 2014 to cater to WRAS listeners.

=== Programming ===
Most of the stations presently air a mix of classical music, and news and talk programming sourced from NPR; however, some stations carry select locally produced programming. WRAS airs NPR news and talk programming during the hours that GPB programs it.

Previously, GPB Radio was transmitted over the second audio program feed of GPB's television stations at most times prior to the 2009 digital television transition. GPB Radio is still audible through this function on DirecTV, but not GPB's digital television stations or on cable for unknown reasons.

GPB Radio stations in southern and southeastern Georgia also relay hurricane evacuation information for listeners approaching or leaving Georgia's Atlantic Coast or the Florida Panhandle. Signs along interstate and other major highways in the region direct the evacuee to the nearest GPB Radio station carrying the emergency information.

=== Radio stations ===
Call sign	Frequency	City of license	FID	ERP (W)	HAAT	Class	Transmitter coordinates	FCC info
WABR	91.1 FM	Tifton, Georgia	23925	30,000	76 m (249 ft)	C2	31°29′31″N 83°31′49″W	LMS
WACG-FM	90.7 FM	Augusta, Georgia	23922	3,700	420.8 m (1,381 ft)	C2	33°24′19″N 81°50′14″W	LMS
WGPB	97.7 FM	Rome, Georgia	6797	4,200	241 m (791 ft)	C3	34°14′5″N 85°13′48″W	LMS
WJSP-FM	88.1 FM	Warm Springs, Georgia	23927	100,000	461.2 m (1,513 ft)	C	32°51′08″N 84°42′04″W	LMS
WJWV	90.9 FM	Fort Gaines, Georgia	23946	20,500 horiz. 81,000 vert.	78.9 m (259 ft)	C1	31°36′18″N 85°01′42″W	LMS
WMUM-FM (Note: WMUM-FM also airs some local programming from Mercer University.)	89.7 FM	Cochran, Georgia	23939	43,000 horiz. 100,000 vert.	304.1 m (998 ft)	C0	32°28′12″N 83°15′17″W	LMS
WNGH-FM	98.9 FM	Chatsworth, Georgia	2309	420	541.8 m (1,778 ft)	C3	34°45′2″N 84°42′52.9″W	LMS
WNGU	89.5 FM	Dahlonega, Georgia	76477	750	140 m (459 ft)	A	34°31′29″N 83°59′50″W	LMS
WPPR	88.3 FM	Demorest, Georgia	23949	7,300	193.9 m (636 ft)	C2	34°31′24″N 83°40′46″W	LMS
WRAS (Note: Separate feed from other GPB stations; GPB portion of station schedule from 5 a.m. to 7 p.m. Monday–Friday, 8 a.m. to 6 p.m. Saturday and Sunday.)	88.5 FM	Atlanta, Georgia	23959	50,000	318 m (1,043 ft)	C1	33°44′41″N 84°21′36″W	LMS
WSVH	91.1 FM	Savannah, Georgia	23926	96,000	430.9 m (1,414 ft)	C0	32°08′49″N 81°37′04″W	LMS
WUGA	91.7 FM	Athens, Georgia	22982	6,000	99 m (325 ft)	A	33°55′13″N 83°14′46″W	LMS
WUNV	91.7 FM	Albany, Georgia	23919	3000	100 m (328 ft)	A	31°40′21″N 84°03′27″W	LMS
WUWG (Note: Simulcasts WRAS (FM) from 5 a.m. to 7 p.m. daily. Carries regular Network feed 7 p.m. – 5 a.m.)	90.7 FM	Carrollton, Georgia	71602	430	151 m (495 ft)	A	33°33′50″N 85°01′04″W	LMS
WWET	91.7 FM	Valdosta, Georgia	23923	430	26 m (85 ft)	A	30°49′36″N 83°16′40″W	LMS
WWIO-FM (Note: WWIO-FM acts as a full-power relay of WSVH.)	88.9 FM	Brunswick, Georgia	23944	11,500	46 m (151 ft)	C3	31°11′21″N 81°29′04″W	LMS
WXVS	90.1 FM	Waycross, Georgia	23923	79,000 horiz. 77,600 vert.	280 m (919 ft)	C1	31°13′18″N 82°34′24″W	LMS

=== Notes ===
WGPB and WNGH were commercial radio stations purchased by a GPB foundation in the late 2000s, hence their location outside of the 88-92 MHz reserved band.

GPB/GPTC also owns translator station W233CA in Athens, which repeats WUGA.

== GPB Education ==
GPB Education (formerly known as Peachstar) serves state agencies and the Georgia learning community through the use of telecommunications technology. GPB delivers educational programming that reflects state standards to Georgia classrooms using the GPB satellite network, open-air television, and the GPB video streaming portal. GPB provides professional development to Georgia educators through face-to-face trainings, satellite-delivered programs, and interactive webcasts. GPB also meets the training needs of state agencies through its video production, satellite broadcast, and interactive webcasting services, as well as through its extensive digital library.

GPB is currently transitioning its GPB Education programming from direct broadcast satellite to digital terrestrial television, through its GPB Knowledge subchannel.

== Departments ==
=== GPB News ===
GPB News is the news department of Georgia Public Broadcasting. It is responsible for providing news updates to both GPB Radio and GPB Television, and collaborates with the Atlanta Business Chronicle to produce the program Georgia Business News. The legislative discussion program Prime Time Lawmakers (formerly known as Lawmakers) provided coverage and commentary on the Georgia General Assembly throughout each session; it aired from 1971 to 2014, when it was replaced by On the Story.

=== GPB Sports ===
GPB Sports produces news coverage and commentary on sports throughout the state, with an emphasis on high school football. It produces the programs GPB SportsCentral, PrepSports and Road to the Dome.
