= WGPC =

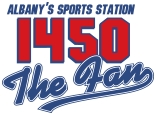
- Albany, Georgia; United States
- Broadcast area: Albany, Georgia
- Frequency: 1450 kHz
- Branding: 1450 The Fan

Programming
- Format: Sports
- Affiliations: CBS Sports Radio; The Weather Channel

Ownership
- Owner: Cumulus Media; (Cumulus Licensing LLC)
- Sister stations: WALG; WNOU; WJAD; WKAK; WQVE

History
- First air date: 1932
- Last air date: January 2, 2017
- Former call signs: WENC (1932–1934)
- Former frequencies: 1420 kHz (1932–1941)

Technical information
- Facility ID: 830
- Class: C
- Power: 1,000 watts
- Transmitter coordinates: 31°34′55″N 84°11′58″W

WGPC (branded as "1450 The Fan") was a radio station serving Albany, Georgia, United States and surrounding cities with sports radio programming from CBS Sports Radio. This station broadcast on AM frequency 1450 kHz and was under ownership of Cumulus Media.

The station was first licensed in 1932 as WENC on 1420 kHz, operating from Americus. In 1934, the station moved to Albany and changed its call letters to WGPC, becoming the first station in the city. In 1941, the North American Regional Broadcasting Agreement moved the station to 1450.

WGPC went dark after its tower, which had been used since 1940, was cut in half during a storm on January 2, 2017. On March 22, 2017, Cumulus told WALB that the WGPC license had been surrendered to the Federal Communications Commission (FCC); the FCC canceled the license on March 24, 2017.
