= Brady Keys =

American football player (1936–2017)

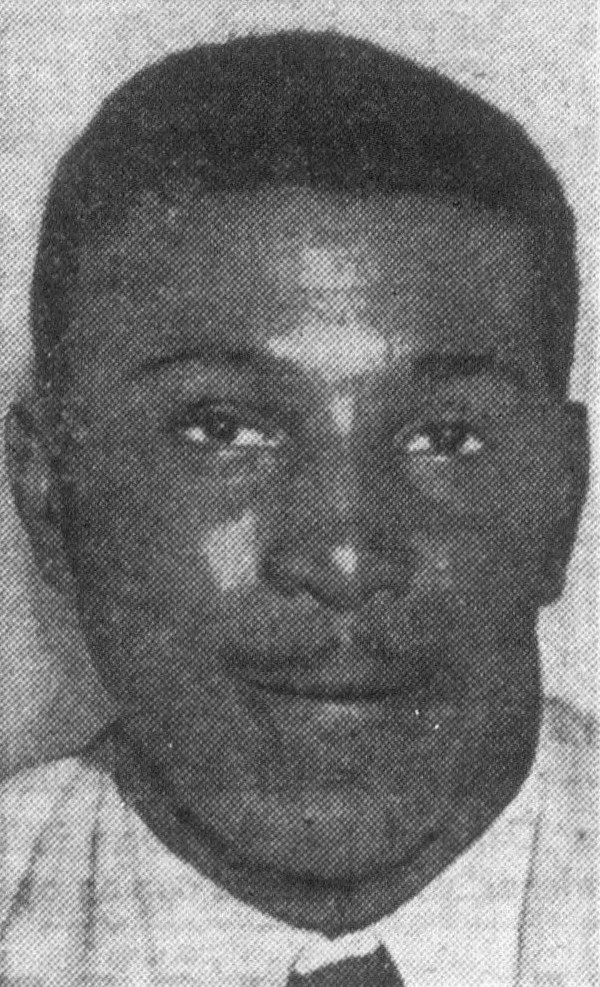
- Keys, circa 1953

No. 26, 24, 29
- Positions: Cornerback, safety, halfback

Personal information
- Born: May 19, 1937; Austin, Texas, U.S.
- Died: October 24, 2017 (aged 80); New York City, New York, U.S.
- Listed height: 6 ft 0 in (1.83 m)
- Listed weight: 185 lb (84 kg)

Career information
- High school: Anderson (Austin); Polytechnic (Los Angeles, California)
- College: Colorado State
- NFL draft: 1960: 14th round, 162nd overall pick

Career history
- Pittsburgh Steelers (1961–1967); Minnesota Vikings (1967); St. Louis Cardinals (1968); New Orleans Saints (1969)*
- * Offseason or practice squad member only

Awards and highlights
- Pro Bowl (1966)

Career NFL statistics
- Interceptions: 16
- Fumble recoveries: 5
- Rushing yards: 14
- Rushing average: 2.3
- Stats at Pro Football Reference

Brady Keys (May 19, 1936 – October 24, 2017 or May 19, 1937 – October 24, 2017) was an American professional football player. He played as a defensive back for eight seasons in the National Football League (NFL), playing for the Pittsburgh Steelers, Minnesota Vikings, and St. Louis Cardinals. He was also a kickoff and punt returner, and holds the Steelers' record for longest punt return in a game (90 yards). Keys played college football at Colorado State as a halfback as well as a defensive back. Keys led the 1960 Colorado State team in rushing yards and total offense.

Keys was America's first Black owner of a national fast-food franchise. His business interests were diverse, and not limited solely to restaurant franchises. Keys had an over 50-year entrepreneurial career that began while he was playing professional football. He also promoted social causes to improve education and safety, and charitable works, during his business career.

== Early life ==
Keys was born on May 19, 1936, or May 19, 1937, in Austin, Texas. He grew up in poverty, living in a shack with his mother, A. C. Franklin, who taught him how to use a sewing machine, iron, and cook from a young age. He attended Anderson High School in Austin, and then later moved to Los Angeles with his mother when he was 14, where he attended Polytechnic High School (Poly). In 1952, the 155 lb (70.3 kg) Keys was a running back on Poly's football team. In 1953, as a junior, Poly was the Eastern League champion, and Keys was named player of the year by the Helms Hall All-Southern California Board of Football, and was also named to its first team at running back. He was used as a tailback in the T formation that season. He was named All-City as both a junior and senior at Poly.

== College career ==
Keys originally attended East Los Angeles Junior College, where he played quarterback on the school's football team in 1955, as well as playing on defense. He was also a member of the track and field team, participating in the broad jump. He left school in 1956, without graduating.

Keys worked from 1956 to 1959, and played semipro football for the Eagle Rock Athletic Club in California. Keys was scouted by Pittsburgh Steelers' scout Fido Murphy, who offered Keys a place on the Steelers' practice squad. After Keys declined that offer, Murphy guided Keys to attend Colorado State University. Keys was not paid to play in games as a semipro player, with only his expenses covered by the Eagle Rock team. Colorado State determined that this did not prohibit him from playing college football under applicable National Collegiate Athletic Association (NCAA) rules, and that he sufficiently retained his amateur status (even though he may not have been considered an amateur under Amateur Athletic Union rules).

He attended Colorado State from 1959 to 1961, majoring in business administration with a focus on accounting. Keys played halfback on offense at Colorado State, and has been described as a sophomore in 1959. Keys missed most of the 1959 season with a broken foot. He rushed 13 times for 100 yards (7.7 yards per carry). His first highlight that season came in a November 14, 1959 game against the University of Utah (the season's penultimate game), when Keys returned a kickoff 85 yards for a touchdown with less than two minutes to play, to win the game for Colorado State. In Colorado State's last game of the season against Brigham Young University the following week, Keys had a 77-yard touchdown run on a rushing play, and passed for a 52-yard touchdown.

In 1960, he rushed for 368 yards in 103 attempts, leading the team in total rushing yards, and had six receptions for 46 yards. He also passed for 63 yards, completing four passes on 16 attempts, with three interceptions. He was second on the team in yards from scrimmage as a rusher and receiver and first in combined yards on offense, as a passer, runner, and receiver. He was a member of Colorado State's track and field team, participating in the 50-yard dash, the 50-yard low hurdles, the broad jump, the mile run and the 880-yard run. In 1996, Keys was inducted into the Colorado State Athletics Hall of Fame.

== Professional football career ==
=== Pittsburgh Steelers ===
The Pittsburgh Steelers selected Keys in the 14th round of the 1960 NFL draft, 162nd overall. The draft took place in late 1959, when Keys was a junior at Colorado State, though 1959 has also been described as his sophomore season. He played one more year with Colorado State, and began his rookie season in 1961 with the Steelers. He suffered a fracture beneath his right eye during a kickoff return in a mid-August 1961 exhibition game, and was inactive until after the season's first game in September. He started eight of the 12 games in which he appeared that season. He played both offense (halfback) and defense (strong safety and cornerback), with two interceptions that season and six rushing attempts. He returned nine punts for 135 yards, including a 66-yard return. He also returned two kickoffs.

In 1962, Keys played both right and left cornerback, starting all 14 games for the Steelers. He had three interceptions that season; and returned 28 kickoffs for 667 yards (23.8 yards per return) and seven punt returns for 46 yards. During his third season with the Steelers (1963), he started nine of the 11 games in which he played, playing right cornerback. Keys has stated that he did not give up a touchdown pass that entire season. He returned 13 punts for 198 yards, and nine kickoffs for 219 yards. On September 15, 1963, Keys returned a punt 76 yards, breaking the Steelers' team record of 70 yards set in 1952 by Ray Mathews. He broke the record again the following week with an 82-yard punt return in a September 22 game against the New York Giants.

Keys broke his own punt return record again the following season in a September 20, 1964 game against the New York Giants, with a 90-yard return, that remains the Steelers' team record (through the 2025 season). It was also the longest punt return in the NFL that season. Keys was tackled on the one-yard line by Joe Morrison. Keys said at the time "'I should have made a fair catch because they were so close to me . . . but I gambled I could get away'". He started all 14 games at left cornerback that season, with two interceptions. He returned 14 punts for 172 yards, and seven kickoffs for 168 yards.

In 1965, he started all 14 games, again playing both cornerback positions. He had one interception, and returned 10 punts for 77 yards. Keys started all 14 games for the Steelers in 1966, and went to the Pro Bowl for the only time in his career; the Newspaper Enterprise Association naming him second-team All-Pro. He had a career best four interceptions that season, but did not consider this his best season. He stated that defensive backs get attention based on the number of interceptions they make, but that the quality of a season as a defensive back also involves whether or not the defender gets beaten for touchdown passes; expressing pride in the fact he did not allow any touchdown receptions in his third season.

The Steelers traded Keys to the Minnesota Vikings for two draft picks in late October the following season (1967), after Steelers' coach Bill Austin believed Keys' coverage failures during the preceding two games led to Steelers' losses. Keys himself rejected Austin's assertion that Keys was the cause of the Steelers losing those two games, and reporting at the time indicated broader issues with the Steelers' defense in those games. Austin believed Keys' play had fallen off from the prior season and that Keys was not playing within the Steelers' defensive system, and while Keys recognized he had played poorly in his final two Steelers' game, he believed he had played well before that, not yielding any touchdown passes. Keys decided not to make the parting acrimonious, and Austin even stated that Keys made the parting "very pleasant", and thought Keys might be able to help the Vikings.

During his seven years with the Steelers, Keys started 79 games and had 14 interceptions. He returned 60 punts for 644 yards (10.7 yards per return), and 47 kickoffs for 1,113 yards.

=== Minnesota Vikings and St. Louis Cardinals ===
While Keys started all six games he had played with the Steelers in 1967, with two interceptions and one fumble recovery, he did not start in any of his eight games with the Vikings; though he did have one interception that he returned for 30 yards. His one interception came against the Steelers in late November 1967, in a 41–27 Vikings' win (one of only three wins on the season). Keys played most of the second half of that game at cornerback and was calling out the Steelers' offensive play before they happened; giving the Vikings an advantage. After the game, Keys and his former Steelers teammates expressed friendship toward each other.

In July 1968, the Vikings traded Keys to the St. Louis Cardinals for an originally unidentified player, who later turned out to be Jerry Hillebrand. After failing a physical, Hillebrand returned to the Cardinals, but Keys also stayed with the Cardinals. He began the season as one of the Cardinals' starting cornerbacks. Keys started five of the seven games in which he appeared for the Cardinals, with one interception. This was the last season of his NFL career.

In February 1969, the Cardinals traded Keys to the New Orleans Saints, along with Dave Long, Dick Kasperek, and a second round draft choice (Richard Neal) for John Gilliam. Keys announced his retirement in early July 1969, further stating his business would donate at least $15,000 to the National Football League's Players Pension Fund. Overall during his eight season career, Keys played in 100 games, started 84, and had 16 interceptions.

== Restaurant and business career ==
While with the Steelers, Keys had an interest in developing his own business. He had studied business administration, participated in Jim Brown's Black Investment Group, started his own real estate business, and worked as a personnel executive for Douglas Aircraft Company. In 1965, Keys concluded that "southern friend chicken" restaurants presented a popular business opportunity, and studied how to develop such a business for himself. In January 1967, Keys opened Brady Keys All Pro Chicken (or Brady Keys All Pro Chicken Supreme) restaurant in San Diego. The restaurant served chicken made in a flour-based spicy batter that Keys himself had formulated. He had a second franchise by August 1967, and planned more. He stated "These franchises are for the low-income person who wants a business . . . It's take-out and delivery. One man can run it with a delivery person". The franchise came to be known as All Pro Fried Chicken. His restaurant menu was written in the language of football. For example, a first down meant a two-piece chicken order and a touchdown meant a 21-piece order.

After being turned down for loans by a variety of banks he was loaned his seed money by Dan Rooney, then president of the Pittsburgh Steelers and son of team owner Art Rooney, to establish All Pro Fried Chicken, through which he became America's first black franchisor. Keys considered Dan Rooney as not only part of the team ownership, but a friend, who loaned him the money without question. After opening his first store in January 1967, at its peak All Pro Fried Chicken had 150 franchises and was run by Keys as a family business. It has also been reported that he had 40 franchise restaurants, or 50 restaurants, before selling the business. The business was centered in Pittsburgh, and the majority of the franchises were in inner-city locations. Keys was president, and considered the business itself multiracial, including board chairman Walter E. Gregg.

Some of Keys early franchise investors included, among others, fellow athletes Jim Brown, Lou Brock, Matt Snell, Ernie Ladd, Otis Taylor, and Buck Buchanan. He obtained a $250,000 loan from a subsidiary of First National City Bank of New York (now Citibank), headed by Philip C. Smith, who Keys stated was willing to take a chance on a business headed by an African American when other lenders were not. Keys observed that the other lenders lacked sufficient precedent to look past race and solely at his business model, and stated "'I intend to give American bankers the model of the company with successful black leadership'".

In 1969 he decided he needed to diversify and following a meeting with James McLamore he agreed to take on a struggling Burger King franchise in Detroit, which he turned around using a series of innovative approaches, being credited by some for coming up with Burger King's famous saying 'Have it your way'. By 1988 he owned 13 restaurants in Detroit. It is also reported that in 1989, he owned 13 Burger King restaurants in Detroit.

In September 1970 he entered into a joint venture with Kentucky Fried Chicken (KFC) to take a 50 percent stake in six stores in the Detroit area, as a condition to this agreement he was required to liquidate all of his All Pro Fried Chicken restaurants, most of which were sold to the franchisees. By 1972 he owned these six restaurants outright.

In 1982 due to increased competition the stores had run into trouble and to secure their long-term future KFC offered him to swap these six restaurants for four anywhere else in the country under the normal terms of a franchisee to which he agreed choosing four restaurants based in Albany, Georgia. By 2002, when he exited the business, he owned 11 KFC franchises.

== Legacy ==
Throughout his pioneering business career Keys consistently advocated for black-owned businesses, including founding both Burger King's and KFC's Minority Franchise Associations. He was the first black board member of the International Franchise Association. In 1971 he successfully lobbied Burger King to award the contract for its first inner city restaurant construction to a Black-owned business. In 1973 he testified in front of Congress about his work in franchising and opportunities for minorities. In 1986 whilst on the executive board of the Burger King/PUSH Economic Development Covenant he was instrumental on securing an agreement with Burger King to funnel $750,000 into the black community, which at the time was the largest commitment made by any fast-food company. In 1970, he was appointed to President Nixon's Minority Business Advisory Board.

Pittsburgh Steelers publicity director Joe Gordon said of Keys, "'He was basically the kind of guy you want on a sports team because he gets involved in the community and is very visible . . . He's the type of guy you could always rely on'". Keys philosophy was "'Number 1, I don't worry about nothing I can't change and don't want to change. Number 2, I surround myself with good people, we develop and plan and we work with our plan'". Keys was known for being blunt and direct. He believed that lack of business ownership by African Americans was due to lack of access to capital; that it was essential to have money to support a politician to have any actual influence in politics; that the only alternatives to unionized employees was to treat employees well in all aspects of their work lives; and in 1983 was quoted as saying regarding his business life "'I have no permanent enemies and no permanent friends, only permanent interests'".

== Personal life and death ==
In addition to restaurant related businesses, Keys owned two radio stations in Albany, Georgia (WJIZ-FM and WJYZ-AM) and airport gift shops in Orlando, Florida. Under the umbrella of the Keys Group Company, in the early 1980s, he owned six Burger King restaurants in Detroit, six KFC restaurants in Georgia, a coal brokerage, an oil well company, and video games interests. At the time, the Keys Group was the 87th largest Black-owned business (based on income) and eighth largest employer.

In 1982, he created the Brady Keys Athletic Foundation that provided scholarships to Albany State University students. In 1983, he began the Albany High KFC Christmas high school basketball tournament. In 1990, Keys helped form the KEYS (Kids Enjoy Yourself Without Drugs) Kids, aimed at elementary school children as a drug prevention program. In 1994, he sponsored gun buy-back programs, and in 2002, formed a program to help students and their parents use computer technology to improve communications with schools. Among his other charitable works and financially supportive efforts in the Black community, Keys helped some of his employees start businesses, provided college scholarships beyond Albany, was active in the Detroit community, and was a sponsor for Grand Prix racer Leavy Morgan.

Keys headed the Keys Group in Albany, until relocating to Orlando in 2002, where he had opened the airport gift shops in 1992. Keys and his wife Anna Marie had six children. He died on October 24, 2017, after complications from a stroke. He was buried at Inglewood Park Cemetery.
