= B100 =

B100 may refer to:

== Radio stations ==
- KBEA-FM (99.7 FM, "B100"), a radio station in Muscatine, Iowa, US
- WBYT (100.7 FM. "B100"), a radio station in South Bend, Indiana, US
- KFMB-FM (100.7 FM, "B-100"), a radio station in San Diego, California, US, now known as KFBG
- CKBZ-FM (100.3 FM, "B-100"), a radio station in Kamloops, British Columbia, Canada
- WKXB (99.9 FM, "B-100"), a radio station in Wilmington, North Carolina, US, formerly known as WVBS-FM
- WOBB (100.3 FM, "B-100"), a radio station in Tifton, Georgia, US

== Technology ==
- Nvidia B100, a GPU
- B100, a 100% biodiesel
- 100 amp, type B, a standard circuit breaker current rating

== Transportation ==
- B100 road (Great Britain)
- B100 (New York City bus), US
- Great Ocean Road (route number B100), Victoria, Australia
