= WRAK =

WRAK can refer to:

- WRAK (AM), a radio station (1400 AM) licensed to Williamsport, Pennsylvania, United States
- WRAK-FM, a radio station (97.3 FM) licensed to Bainbridge, Georgia, United States, part of the Tallahassee, Florida market
