= WMRZ =

Radio station in Dawson–Albany, Georgia

- Dawson, Georgia; United States
- Broadcast area: Albany, Georgia
- Frequency: 98.1 MHz
- Branding: 98.1 Kiss FM

Programming
- Format: Urban adult contemporary
- Affiliations: Premiere Networks

Ownership
- Owner: iHeartMedia, Inc.; (iHM Licenses, LLC)
- Sister stations: WJYZ, WGEX, WJIZ-FM, WOBB

History
- First air date: June 2005; 20 years ago

Technical information
- Licensing authority: FCC
- Facility ID: 88542
- Class: C3
- ERP: 25,000 watts
- HAAT: 79.9 meters (262 ft)
- Transmitter coordinates: 31°37′29.00″N 84°19′20.00″W

Links
- Public license information: Public file; LMS
- Webcast: Listen Live
- Website: kissalbany.iheart.com

WMRZ (98.1 FM) is a radio station broadcasting an urban adult contemporary format. Licensed to Dawson, Georgia, United States, the station serves the Albany area. The station is owned by iHeartMedia, Inc. Its studios are on Westover Boulevard in Albany, and the transmitter is located northwest of Albany.

== History ==
The station was assigned call sign WMRZ on May 5, 2003; it signed on in June 2005. The station's logo is similar to the one used by San Francisco sister station KISQ when it had an urban adult contemporary format.
