= Old St. Teresa Catholic Church =

Historic church in Georgia, United States

- Old St. Teresa's Catholic Church
- U.S. National Register of Historic Places
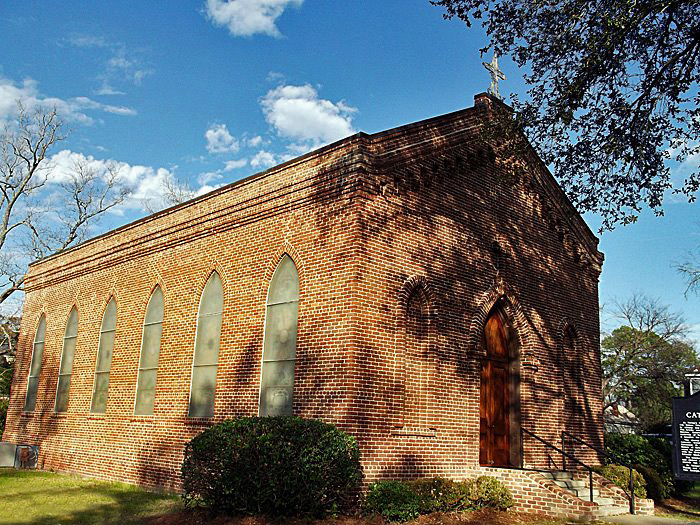

- Location within Georgia Location within the United States
- Location: 313 Residence Avenue; Albany, Georgia
- Coordinates: 31°34′59″N 84°9′17″W
- Area: 1 acre (0.40 ha)
- Built: 1859
- Architect: Father Thomas O'Reilly
- NRHP reference No.: 75000589
- Added to NRHP: April 1, 1975

Old St. Teresa Church is located in downtown Albany, Georgia, on Residence Avenue. It is the oldest church building in Albany. The name Old St. Teresa Catholic Church was given, because it changed to a new location in Albany. The church was kept in use and at least one Mass is a held every week.

== History ==
Construction on the church began in 1859, on land that was given by Colonel Nelson Tift, the founder of Albany. The bricks that make up the building were handmade by enslaved workers on a plantation near Newton, Georgia. Due to the Civil War, construction of the church was halted until the interior was completed. It was then used as a hospital for wounded Confederate soldiers. After the war, the building was completed and dedicated under the patronage of St. Teresa of Ávila on November 19, 1882, by William Hickley Gross, who was the Bishop of Savannah at the time. The church was added to the National Register of Historic Places in 1975.

== Currently ==
A new larger parish church was dedicated in 1958, but the downtown location was kept as a second church. A Mass is conducted every Wednesday at noon at the Residence Avenue address.
