= Nelson Tift Building =

- Albany Housefurnishing Company
- U.S. National Register of Historic Places
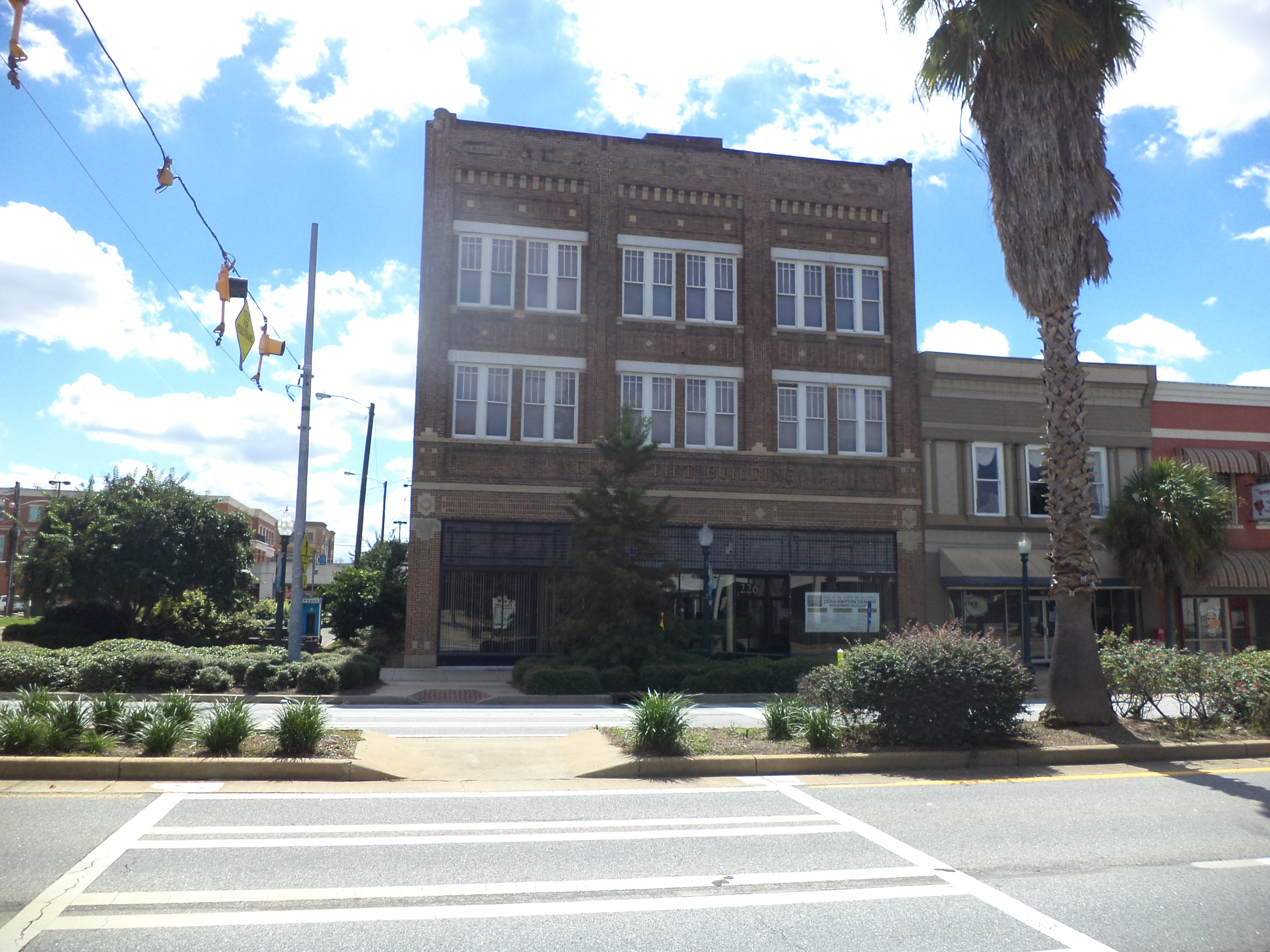

- Location within Georgia
- Location: 226 W. Broad Ave., Albany, Georgia
- Coordinates: 31°34′35″N 84°9′9″W
- Area: Less than 1 acre (0.40 ha)
- Built: 1922
- Built by: J. C. Hind
- Architect: J. T. Murphey
- NRHP reference No.: 82002402
- Added to NRHP: June 17, 1982

The Nelson Tift Building, also known as the Goodwill Building or Albany Housefurnishing Company, is a historic four-story commercial building in Albany, Georgia, United States. It was built in 1922 specifically to display furniture.

Located at 226 West Broad Avenue, it was added to the National Register of Historic Places on June 17, 1982.(wrong link)

It is named for the founder of Albany, Nelson Tift.
