= WJYZ =

Radio station in Albany, Georgia

Albany, Georgia; United States
- Broadcast area: Albany, Georgia
- Frequency: 960 kHz
- Branding: 960 WJYZ The Light

Programming
- Format: Gospel

Ownership
- Owner: iHeartMedia, Inc.; (iHM Licenses, LLC)
- Sister stations: WGEX, WJIZ-FM, WMRZ, WOBB

History
- First air date: February 6, 1987 (as WGOP)
- Former call signs: WGOP (1987–1988); WJIZ (1988)

Technical information
- Licensing authority: FCC
- Facility ID: 6617
- Class: B
- Power: 5,000 watts day 390 watts night
- Transmitter coordinates: 31°37′5.00″N 84°10′31.00″W

Links
- Public license information: Public file; LMS
- Webcast: Listen Live
- Website: wjyz.iheart.com

WJYZ (960 AM) is a Christian radio station broadcasting a gospel format. Licensed to Albany, Georgia, United States, the station serves the Albany area. The station is owned by iHeartMedia, Inc. Its studios are on Westover Boulevard in Albany, and the transmitter is located near the interchange of Slappney Boulevard at U.S. Highway 82 in north Albany.

== History ==
The station went on the air as WGOP on February 6, 1987. On March 11, 1988, the station changed its call sign to WJIZ; and on December 22, 1988, to the current WJYZ.
