= WNOU (FM) =

Radio station in Sasser-Albany, Georgia

- Sasser, Georgia; United States
- Broadcast area: Albany, Georgia
- Frequency: 107.7 MHz
- Branding: 107.7 Now FM

Programming
- Format: Hot adult contemporary
- Affiliations: Compass Media Networks

Ownership
- Owner: Rick Lambert and Bob Spencer; (First Media Services, LLC)
- Sister stations: WALG, WJAD, WKAK, WQVE

History
- First air date: 1995
- Former call signs: WEGC (1995–2023)
- Call sign meaning: similar to "now"

Technical information
- Licensing authority: FCC
- Facility ID: 40463
- Class: C3
- ERP: 11,500 watts
- HAAT: 95 meters (312 ft)
- Transmitter coordinates: 31°38′42.60″N 84°21′14.60″W

Links
- Public license information: Public file; LMS
- Webcast: Listen live
- Website: 107.7 Now FM Online

WNOU (107.7 FM, "107.7 Now FM") is a radio station serving Albany, Georgia, and surrounding cities with a hot adult contemporary format. This station is under ownership of Rick Lambert and Bob Spencer, through licensee First Media Services, LLC. Its studios are on Broad Avenue just west of downtown Albany, and the transmitter is located west of Albany.

== History ==
On April 30, 2020, Cumulus Media sold its entire Albany cluster for First Media Services for $450,000. The sale was consummated on December 15, 2020.

Former logo

On March 17, 2023, at 1:07 p.m., WEGC changed formats from adult contemporary (as "Mix 107.7") to hot adult contemporary, branded as "107.7 Now FM". The station changed its call sign to WNOU on March 27, 2023.
