= WJIZ-FM =

Radio station in Albany, Georgia

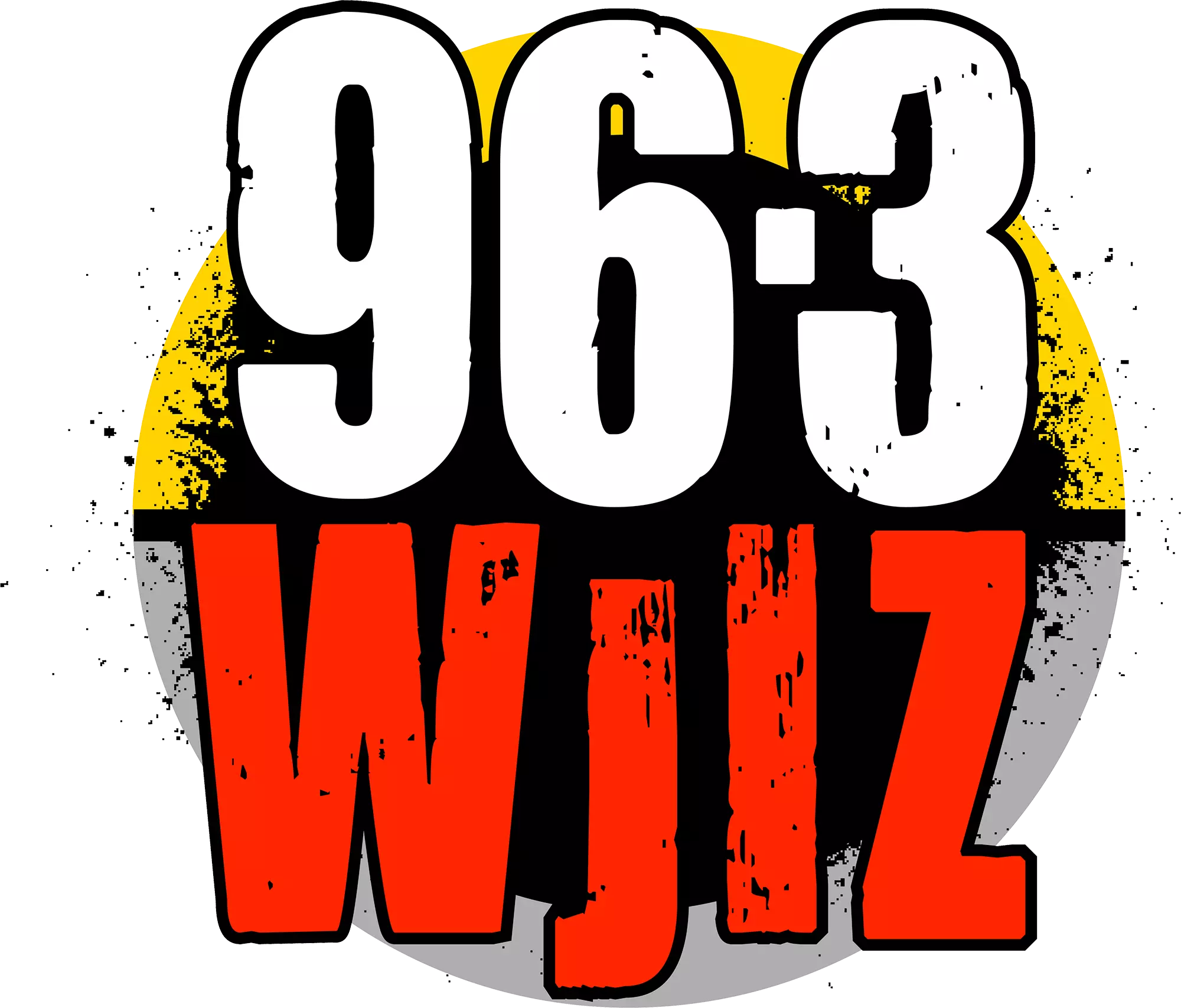

Albany, Georgia; United States
- Frequency: 96.3 MHz
- Branding: 96.3 WJIZ

Programming
- Format: Mainstream urban
- Affiliations: Premiere Networks

Ownership
- Owner: iHeartMedia; (iHM Licenses, LLC)
- Sister stations: WJYZ, WGEX, WMRZ, WOBB

History
- Founded: 1962

Technical information
- Licensing authority: FCC
- Facility ID: 6616
- Class: C1
- ERP: 79,000 watts
- HAAT: 248.0 meters
- Transmitter coordinates: 31°32′58.00″N 84°00′19.00″W

Links
- Public license information: Public file; LMS
- Webcast: Listen Live
- Website: wjiz.iheart.com

WJIZ-FM (96.3 MHz) is a radio station broadcasting a mainstream urban format. Licensed to Albany, Georgia, United States, the station is currently owned by iHeartMedia and features programming from Premiere Networks. Its studios are on Westover Boulevard in Albany, and the transmitter is located east of Albany.

Former logo
