= WKAK =

Radio station in Albany, Georgia

- Albany, Georgia; United States
- Broadcast area: Albany, Georgia
- Frequency: 104.5 MHz
- Branding: Georgia 104.5

Programming
- Format: Country

Ownership
- Owner: Rick Lambert and Bob Spencer; (First Media Services, LLC)
- Sister stations: WALG; WNOU; WJAD; WQVE

History
- First air date: 1963 (as WGPC-FM)
- Former call signs: WGPC-FM (1963–1999)

Technical information
- Licensing authority: FCC
- Facility ID: 831
- Class: C1
- ERP: 98,000 watts 100,000 watts with beam tilt
- HAAT: 299 meters (981 ft)
- Transmitter coordinates: 31°32′57.6″N 84°0′18.7″W

Links
- Public license information: Public file; LMS

WKAK (branded as "Georgia 104.5") is a radio station serving Albany, Georgia, and surrounding cities with a country music format. This station broadcasts on FM frequency 104.5 MHz and is under ownership of Rick Lambert and Bob Spencer, through licensee First Media Services, LLC. Its studios are on Broad Avenue just west of downtown Albany, and the transmitter is located east of Albany.

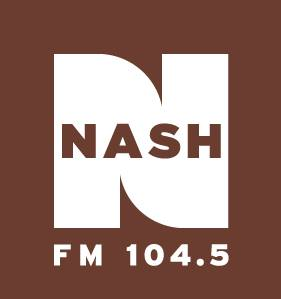
Logo as "Nash FM 104.5"

On April 30, 2020, Cumulus Media sold its entire Albany cluster for First Media Services for $450,000. The sale was consummated on December 15, 2020. On April 7, 2021, WKAK dropped Cumulus' Nash FM branding and rebranded as "Georgia 104.5".
