= WJAD =

Radio station in Leesburg-Albany, Georgia

Leesburg, Georgia; United States
- Broadcast area: Albany, Georgia
- Frequency: 103.5 MHz
- Branding: Rock 103

Programming
- Format: Mainstream rock

Ownership
- Owner: Rick Lambert and Bob Spencer; (First Media Services, LLC)
- Sister stations: WALG, WNOU, WKAK, WQVE

History
- First air date: 1979; 47 years ago

Technical information
- Licensing authority: FCC
- Facility ID: 57782
- Class: C3
- ERP: 12,500 watts
- HAAT: 141 meters (463 ft)
- Transmitter coordinates: 31°40′18.60″N 84°03′31.60″W

Links
- Public license information: Public file; LMS
- Webcast: Listen live
- Website: www.georgialistens.com/stations/rock103albany/

WJAD (branded as "Rock 103") is a radio station serving Albany, Georgia and surrounding cities with a mainstream rock format. This station broadcasts on FM frequency 103.5 MHz and is under ownership of Rick Lambert and Bob Spencer, through licensee First Media Services, LLC. Its studios are on Broad Avenue just west of downtown Albany, and the transmitter is located northeast of Albany.

Programming includes, John Boy and Billy in the mornings, Nikki Miller in middays, Steve Thomas afternoons and Mud weeknights. Rock 103 is also the southwest Georgia home for Georgia Bulldogs football. The station airs Flashback with MTV's Mat Pinfield on Sundays.

On April 30, 2020, Cumulus Media sold its entire Albany cluster for First Media Services for $450,000. The sale was consummated on December 15, 2020.
