= WOBB =

Radio station in Tifton-Albany, Georgia

- Tifton, Georgia; United States
- Broadcast area: Albany, Georgia
- Frequency: 100.3 MHz
- Branding: B100

Programming
- Format: Country
- Affiliations: Premiere Radio Networks

Ownership
- Owner: iHeartMedia, Inc.; (iHM Licenses, LLC)
- Sister stations: WJYZ, WGEX, WJIZ-FM, WMRZ

History
- First air date: 1975 (as WCUP)
- Former call signs: WCUP (1975–1985); WSGY (1985–1994)

Technical information
- Licensing authority: FCC
- Facility ID: 74182
- Class: C0
- ERP: 100,000 watts
- HAAT: 304 meters (997 ft)
- Transmitter coordinates: 31°25′51.00″N 83°45′10.00″W

Links
- Public license information: Public file; LMS
- Webcast: listen live
- Website: https://b100wobb.iheart.com/

WOBB (100.3 FM) is a radio station broadcasting a country music format. Licensed to Tifton, Georgia, United States, the station serves the Albany, Georgia area. The station is owned by iHeartMedia, Inc. and features programming from Premiere Radio Networks. Its studios are on Westover Boulevard in Albany, and the transmitter is located southeast of Sylvester, Georgia.

== History ==
The station signed on the air with the assigned call sign WCUP in 1975, and first picked up a beautiful music format. In 1983, WCUP flipped its format to Top 40/CHR after former Top 40 station WWGS-AM dropped its format. On August 1, 1985, the station changed its call sign to WSGY, and became known as "Y-100" ("South Georgia's Power Station"). When 1989 rolled along, the station downgraded its Top 40 format to an adult contemporary format. This lasted until mid-1993 when the station dropped the format and flipped to its current country format, and on March 18, 1994, the station changed its call letters to WOBB.
