= WALG =

News/talk radio station in Albany, Georgia, United States

- Albany, Georgia; United States
- Broadcast area: Albany, Georgia
- Frequency: 1590 kHz
- Branding: WALG News/Talk 1590

Programming
- Format: News/talk
- Affiliations: Fox News Radio; Compass Media Networks; Premiere Networks; Westwood One; Georgia Tech Yellow Jackets

Ownership
- Owner: Rick Lambert and Bob Spencer; (First Media Services, LLC)
- Sister stations: WNOU, WJAD, WKAK, WQVE

History
- First air date: May 1941
- Former call signs: WALB (1941–1960)
- Call sign meaning: Albany, Georgia

Technical information
- Licensing authority: FCC
- Facility ID: 54703
- Class: B
- Power: 3,300 watts day; 40 watts night
- Transmitter coordinates: 31°37′15.6″N 84°9′10.7″W
- Translator: 99.3 W257ED (Albany)

Links
- Public license information: Public file; LMS
- Webcast: Listen live
- Website: 1590walg.com

WALG (1590 AM, "News/Talk 1590") is a radio station serving Albany, Georgia, and surrounding cities with a news/talk format. This station is under ownership of Rick Lambert and Bob Spencer, through licensee First Media Services, LLC. Its studios are on Broad Avenue just west of downtown Albany, and the transmitter is located north of Albany.

== Programming ==
=== Former programming ===
As of July 2014, weekday syndicated programming included shows by John Batchelor, Rush Limbaugh, Mark Levin, and Michael Savage plus Red Eye Radio and America's Morning News. Weekend programming included the syndicated The Kim Komando Show hosted by Kim Komando, Smoke This! hosted by Cigar Dave, and Sporting News Radio, and talk shows hosted by Clark Howard, Larry Kudlow, and Gary Sullivan.

Local programming included news and interview program "Wake Up Albany" hosted by Matt Patrick from June 2007 until February 2009.

On-air disc-jockeys included Brother Dave Miller, Bill Young, Steve Preston, Ron Mani, Lil' Country Joe, Ranger Rick Stewart a.k.a. Ricky Horror, Ken Ayers, Tim Rainey, Lisa Lee, and Skip Eliot.

WALG is a former Albany dominant station for Rick Dees Weekly Top 40 in the 1980s.

== History ==
This station was launched as WALB in May 1941 by The Albany Herald. In 1954, the Herald signed on a TV station with the callsign WALB-TV. The AM radio station has been assigned the "WALG" call letters by the Federal Communications Commission (FCC) since it was sold by the Herald to Allen Woodall, Sr., in 1960.

From 1959 till about 1970, the station was known as "Johnny Reb Radio". The rock and roll station was a reporting station for the Gavin Report during those years and therefore had much influence in the southeast U.S.

The studios were located in an area north of the city of Albany near a swamp. The area surrounding the station was low country and covered with water most of the time. A raised walkway led from the small parking lot to the studio. Many deejays were delayed in their air shifts because a fat cottonmouth snake would be sunning themselves on the walkway.

WALG was the 'white' pop/rock station in Albany for decades, and was on the cutting edge of the ever-changing pop music scene for most of that period. There were radio alternatives in Albany such as WGPC, Albany's first station which signed on in 1933. It played beautiful music, and was a charter station for the Atlanta Braves when they moved to Georgia in 1966. For country fans, there was WJAZ at 960 AM, and WLYB went on the air in the 1960s, at 1250AM. Its studio was off Old Leesburg Road, near WALG's transmitter. The 'black' station was WJIZ-FM. Its 100,000–watt transmitter put a listenable signal into Panama City, Florida.

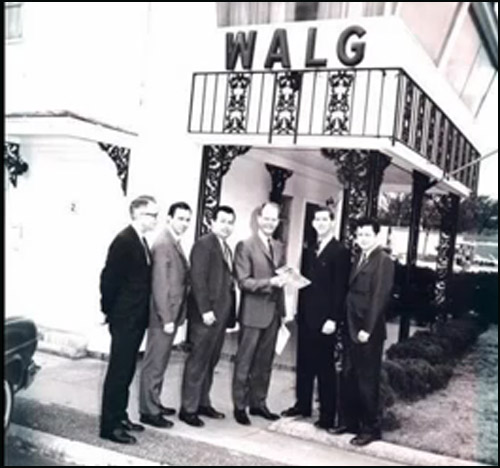
At the Holiday Inn Studio in the 1960s

At one time, WALG even featured traffic reports from an airplane flying over the city, broadcast via 2-way radio piped through the radio console. WALG was also a social innovator. At a time when black voices were only heard on black radio stations, WALG News featured Eddie Grissom, the first black news voice on a 'white' Albany station. It began as a 1,000-watt station, omnidirectional, and then went to 5 kW day, and 1 kW night, with a southerly directional signal that protected WTGA, also at 1590, in Thomaston, Georgia. A "First Phone" license was required to operate the station until more modern equipment was installed in the 1970s, because at power change, the 'Phase Angle' of the signal had to be changed as part of the FCC requirements.

The transmitter was and is located off Old Leesburg Road, at the end of Dunbar Lane, but the studio was for many years located in the Holiday Inn, downtown. This was set to music in some WALG jingles that sang: "We're in a Holiday Inn!"

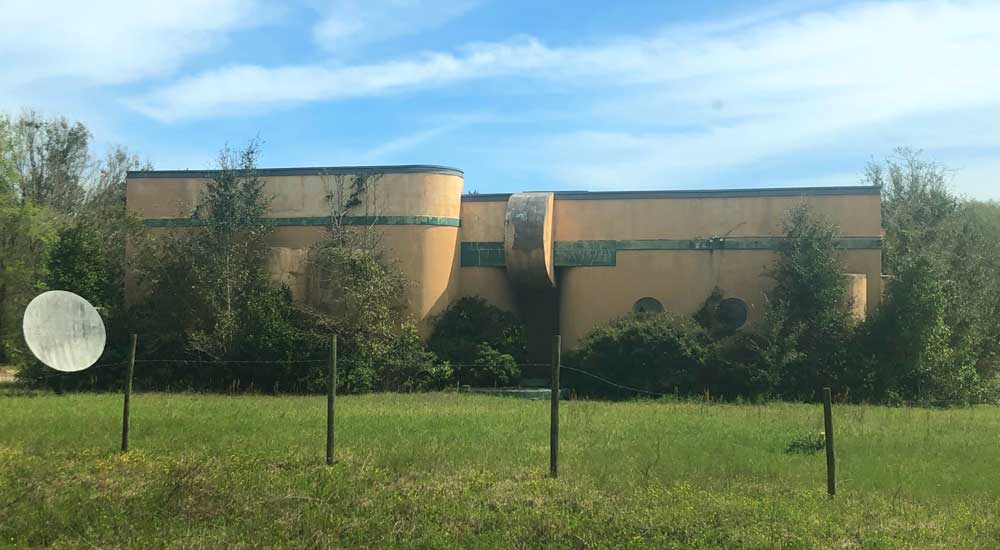
The former studio on Dunbar Lane.

Cumulus moved the WALG studio to the old First State Bank building on the corner of South Slappey Blvd. and Broad Avenue in the 1990s, and the old studio building on Dunbar is boarded up today. For a time that building was leased to a small FM station licensed to Camilla.

On-air personalities from the 1970s included Ron Mani, "Jimmy J." (Jim Janulis), "Buzz One" (Ron Brown), J.J. Stone (Billy Thorman) Christopher Hayes, Rick Ledbetter, Jim King, Sonny Lofton, "Jane", Bill Young, Skip Eliot, Kris Van Dyke, Dave Miller, Jack O'Brien, Mike Speers, Carol Ward, 'Spanky', Rick Stewart, Hal Edwards, Otis Ulm, John Dark, Jack Daniels and Steve Preston. Rockin Rodney did over nights in the early 1970s and later returned as Jaxon Riley in the mid–seventies. The name Jaxon was given to him by Howard Toole aka Howard J Clark.

WALG was managed by many different people through the years, but perhaps its most memorable GM was Mark Shor. Mark was a New Yorker who sold radio ads in deepest South Georgia. Under Shor, WALG, and later with WKAK in the mix, the station saw it highest billing. At its apogee, WALG & WKAK employed thirty people, was live 24/7. Shor mostly worked for the Woodalls, first Whitfield, then Alan. There was a period when Shor parted way with the Woodalls, circa 1973-1975.

John Long was General Manager under owner Ilene Berns, who also owned Bang Records.

Former logo

On April 30, 2020, Cumulus Media sold its entire Albany cluster for First Media Services for $450,000. The sale was consummated on December 15, 2020.
