= WQVE =

Radio station in Albany, Georgia

Albany, Georgia; United States
- Broadcast area: Albany, Georgia
- Frequency: 101.7 MHz
- Branding: V 101.7

Programming
- Format: Urban adult contemporary
- Affiliations: The Touch

Ownership
- Owner: Rick Lambert and Bob Spencer; (First Media Services, LLC)
- Sister stations: WALG, WNOU, WJAD, WKAK

History
- First air date: 1972 (as WWCW)
- Former call signs: WWCW (1972–1978); WWCW-FM (1978–1982); WKAK (1982–1999); WNUQ (1999–2006)

Technical information
- Licensing authority: FCC
- Facility ID: 54704
- Class: A
- ERP: 6,000 watts
- HAAT: 91 meters (299 ft)
- Transmitter coordinates: 31°37′15.6″N 84°9′10.7″W

Links
- Public license information: Public file; LMS
- Webcast: Listen live
- Website: wqvealbany.com

WQVE (101.7 FM, "V 101.7") is a radio station serving Albany, Georgia, United States, and surrounding cities with an urban adult contemporary music format. This station is under ownership of Rick Lambert and Bob Spencer, through licensee First Media Services, LLC. Its studios are on Broad Avenue just west of downtown Albany, and the transmitter is located north of Albany.

On April 30, 2020, Cumulus Media sold its entire Albany cluster for First Media Services for $450,000. The sale was consummated on December 15, 2020.
