= WGEX =

Radio station in Bainbridge–Albany, Georgia

- Bainbridge, Georgia; United States
- Broadcast area: Albany, Georgia; Tallahassee, Florida; Dothan, Alabama
- Frequency: 97.3 MHz
- Branding: Power 97.3

Programming
- Format: Top 40 (CHR)
- Affiliations: Premiere Networks

Ownership
- Owner: iHeartMedia; (iHM Licenses, LLC)
- Sister stations: WJYZ, WJIZ-FM, WMRZ, WOBB

History
- First air date: December 20, 1967 (as WMGR-FM)
- Former call signs: WMGR-FM (1967–1971); WJAD (1971–1994); WMGR-FM (1994–2001); WFXF (2001–2003); WLCL (2003); WMXV (2003); WKGL (2003); WRAK-FM (2003–2010)
- Call sign meaning: W GEneration X (former format)

Technical information
- Licensing authority: FCC
- Facility ID: 52402
- Class: C0
- ERP: 100,000 watts
- HAAT: 304 meters (997 ft)
- Transmitter coordinates: 31°09′12″N 84°32′38″W

Links
- Public license information: Public file; LMS
- Webcast: Listen Live
- Website: power973.iheart.com

WGEX (97.3 FM, "Power 97.3") is a Top 40 (CHR) formatted radio station licensed to Bainbridge, Georgia and serving the Albany, Georgia, Tallahassee, Florida and Dothan, Alabama markets. The station is owned by iHeartMedia. Its studios are on Westover Boulevard in Albany, and the transmitter is located east of Colquitt, Georgia.

== History ==
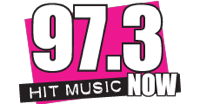
Former logo for WGEX.

Since it signed onto the air on December 20, 1967, WGEX has broadcast numerous music formats including classic rock, modern rock, adult contemporary, and CHR, under numerous callsigns, including WMGR-FM, WJAD-FM, WFXF, WLCL, WMXV, WKGL, and WRAK-FM. Although the station considers numerous music formats throughout the years, WGEX as WJAD-FM formerly was the Albany market's CHR station throughout the 1980s and parts of the early 1990s. In the early-1980s, it was known as "97 Rock", but became known as "97 JAD" later on.

The station previously carried an all 1990s music format as "97.3 Gen X Radio" prior to 2011.

On December 26, 2011, at Midnight, after stunting with Christmas Music for the holidays, WGEX returned to CHR as "97.3 Hit Music Now". On February 18, 2013, WGEX began airing Elvis Duran and the Morning Show. On June 15, 2016, WGEX dropped the "Hit Music Now" branding and switched to "Power 97.3".
