= Albany, Georgia =

Albany
- City
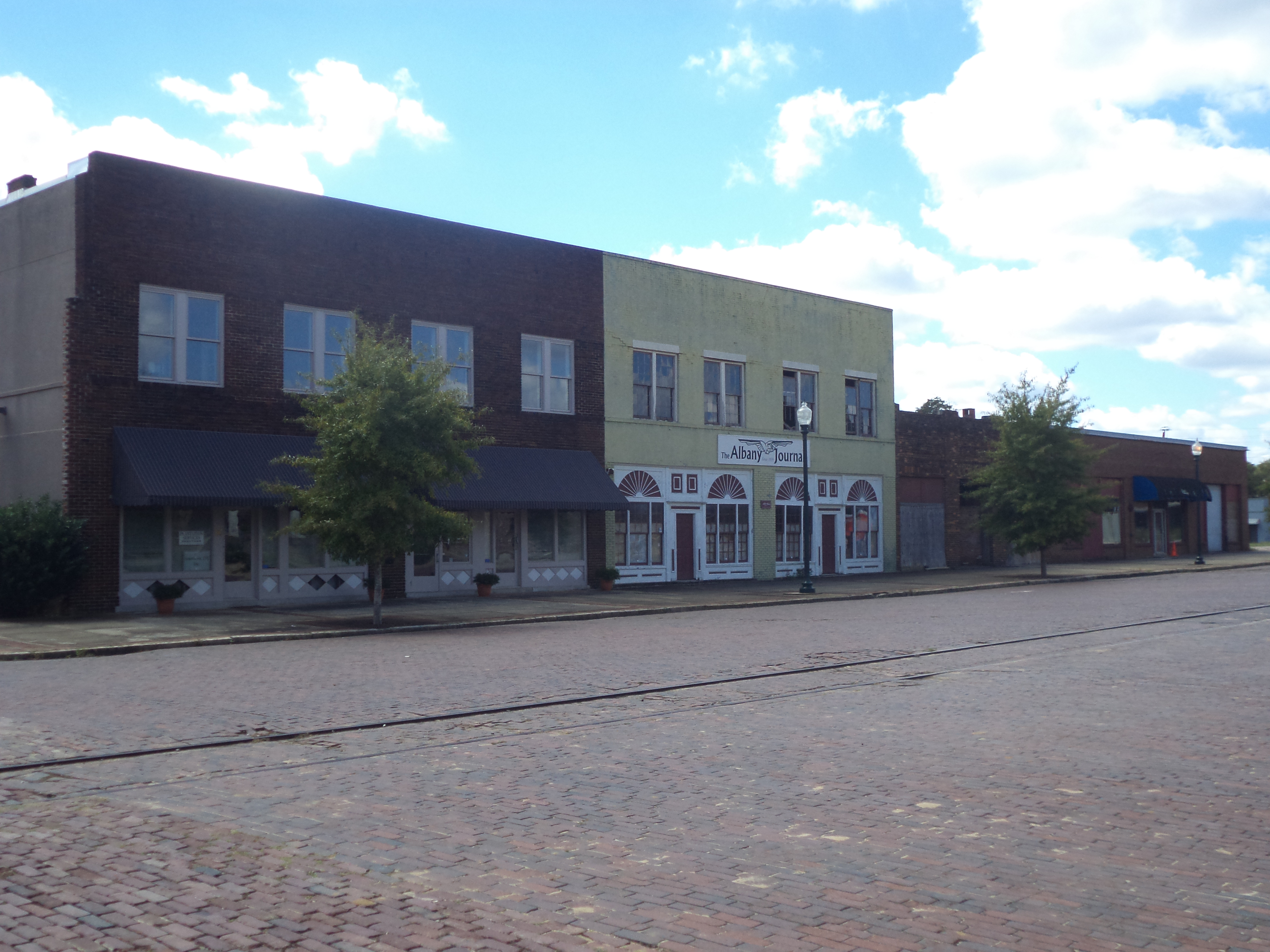
- Albany Railroad Historic District

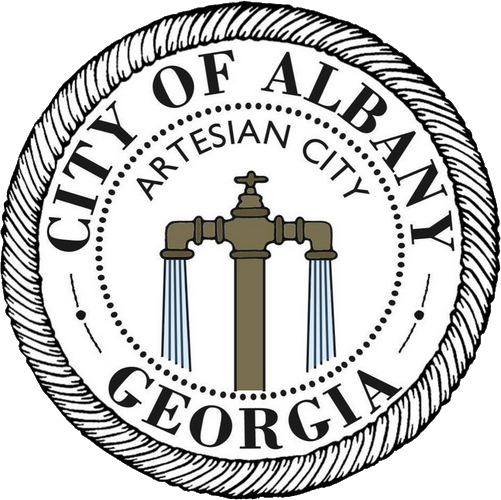
- Flag Seal Logo
- Nicknames: The Good Life City, The Artesian City, Egypt of America
- Motto: "There's only one Albany, Georgia"
- Location in Dougherty County and Georgia

- Location within Georgia Location within the United States Location within North America
- Coordinates: 31°34′56″N 84°9′56″W
- Country: United States
- State: Georgia
- County: Dougherty
- Incorporated (city): December 27, 1838

Government
  - Mayor: Bo Dorough

Area
  - City: 55.83 sq mi (144.59 km^{2})
  - Land: 55.07 sq mi (142.62 km^{2})
  - Water: 0.76 sq mi (1.98 km^{2})
- Elevation: 203 ft (62 m)

Population (2020)
  - City: 69,647
  - Density: 1,264.8/sq mi (488.35/km^{2})
  - Urban: 76,434
  - Metro: 146,961 (US:289 List of Metropolitan Statistical Areas)
- Demonym: Albanian
- Time zone: UTC−5 (EST)
  - Summer (DST): UTC−4 (EDT)
- ZIP code(s): 31701, 31705, 31707, 31721, 31763
- Area code: 229
- FIPS code: 13-01052
- GNIS feature ID: 0310424
- Website: www.albanyga.gov

Albany (/ɔːlˈbɪni/ awl-BIN-ee) is a city in the U.S. state of Georgia. Located on the Flint River, it is the county seat of Dougherty County, and is the sole incorporated city in that county. Located in Southwest Georgia, it is the principal city of the Albany metropolitan area. The city's population was 68,089 in 2020.

It became prominent in the nineteenth century as a shipping and market center, first served by riverboats. Scheduled steamboats connected Albany with the busy port of Apalachicola, Florida. They were replaced by railroads. Seven lines met in Albany, and it was a center of trade in the Southeast.

Albany is part of the Black Belt, a geological formation of soil conducive to cotton growth. An extensive area in the Southern geographical area of the United States. From the mid-20th century, it received military investment during World War II and after that helped develop the region. Albany and this area were prominent during the civil rights era, particularly during the early 1960s as activists worked to regain voting and other civil rights. Railroad restructuring and reduction in the military caused job losses, but the city has developed new businesses. The historically black Albany State University enrolls more than 6,500 students annually.

== History ==
Albany is located in a region which was long inhabited by the Creek Indians, who called it Thronateeska after their word for "flint", the valuable mineral found in beds near the Flint River. They used it for making arrowheads and other tools. In 1830, U.S. Congress passed the Indian Removal Act, and the United States made treaties to extinguish Creek and other Native American land claims in the Southeast. The U.S. Army forcibly removed most of the native peoples to Indian Territory, lands west of the Mississippi River.

=== Nelson Tift ===
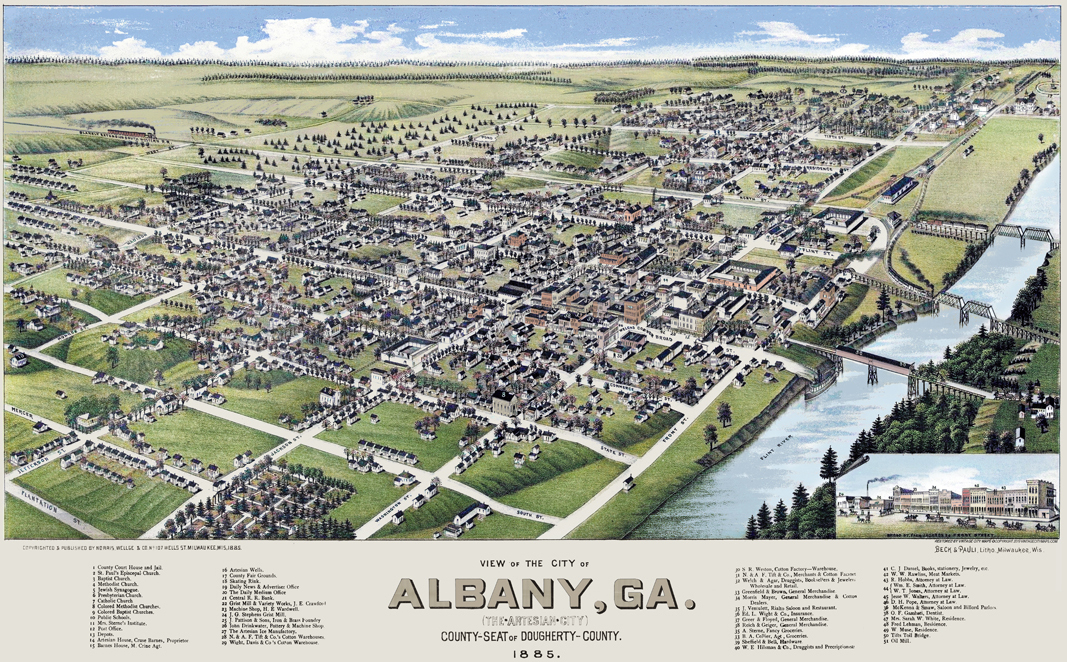
Albany in 1885

Nelson Tift (1810–1891), the founder of Albany

European-American settlement began with Nelson Tift of Groton, Connecticut, who took land along the Flint River in October 1836 after Indian removal. Tift and his colleagues named the new town Albany after the capital of New York; noting that New York's Albany was a commercial center located at the headwaters of the Hudson River, they hoped that their town near the headwaters of the Flint would prove to be just as successful. It proved to be nowhere near as prosperous. Alexander Shotwell laid out the town in 1836, and it was incorporated as a city by an act of the General Assembly of Georgia on December 27, 1838.

Tift was the city's leading entrepreneur for decades. An ardent booster, he promoted education, business, and railroad construction. During the Civil War he provided naval supplies and helped build two ships. He opposed Radical Reconstruction inside the state and in Congress, and was scornful of the Yankee carpetbaggers who came in. Historian John Fair concludes that Tift became "more Southern than many natives." His pro-slavery attitudes before the war and his support for segregation afterward made him compatible with Georgia's white elite.

This area was developed for cotton cultivation by planters, who used numerous enslaved African Americans to clear lands and process the cotton. As a result of the planters' acquisition of slave workers, by 1840 Dougherty County's majority population was black, composed overwhelmingly of slaves. The market center for cotton plantations, Albany was in a prime location for shipping cotton to other markets by steamboats.

In 1858, Tift hired Horace King, a native of the Deep South and a former slave—and a well-respected bridge builder and engineer—to construct a toll bridge over the Flint River. King's bridge toll house still stands.

Already important as a shipping port, Albany later became an important railroad hub in southwestern Georgia. Seven lines were constructed to the town. An exhibit on trains is located at the Thronateeska Heritage Center in the former railroad station.

=== Carey Wentworth Styles ===
After the war, Carey Wentworth Styles moved to Albany and founded the newspaper Albany News. In the early years following the war, Styles, like Tift, took great exception to the Radical Reconstruction program then in force, and advocated for a more moderate response based on his interpretation of Georgia's rights under the Constitution. Styles backed "constitutional reconstruction" advanced by Benjamin H. Hill and sought support for the idea from the national Democratic party. While on a trip to Atlanta in May 1868, to meet with Democratic party leaders, Styles took measure of the contemporary Atlanta newspapers, and found them lacking.

Styles believed them to be little more than organs for the Radical Republican reconstruction agenda. He resolved to bring a paper aligned with the Democratic party viewpoint to the Atlanta market, one supporting his constitutional reconstruction ideals. Styles moved from Albany to Atlanta, and on May 9 he announced that he had obtained the necessary financial backing to purchase the Daily Opinion.

On June 16, 1868, the new Democratic daily (as he described it) printed its first edition, under the name The Constitution. Styles' tenure at the Atlanta Constitution would be brief. Unable to pay for his portion of the purchase, when the sale of his Albany News fell through, Styles was forced to surrender his interest in the paper to his joint venture partners. Styles returned to Albany as editor of the News. In 1872, he was elected to the Georgia Senate, representing Augusta and surrounding communities, in an ironic turn of events, having killed a member of the Georgia House of Representatives in his earlier years. After his legislative service, Styles sold the Albany newspaper in 1876 and returned to Atlanta.

=== 20th century to present ===
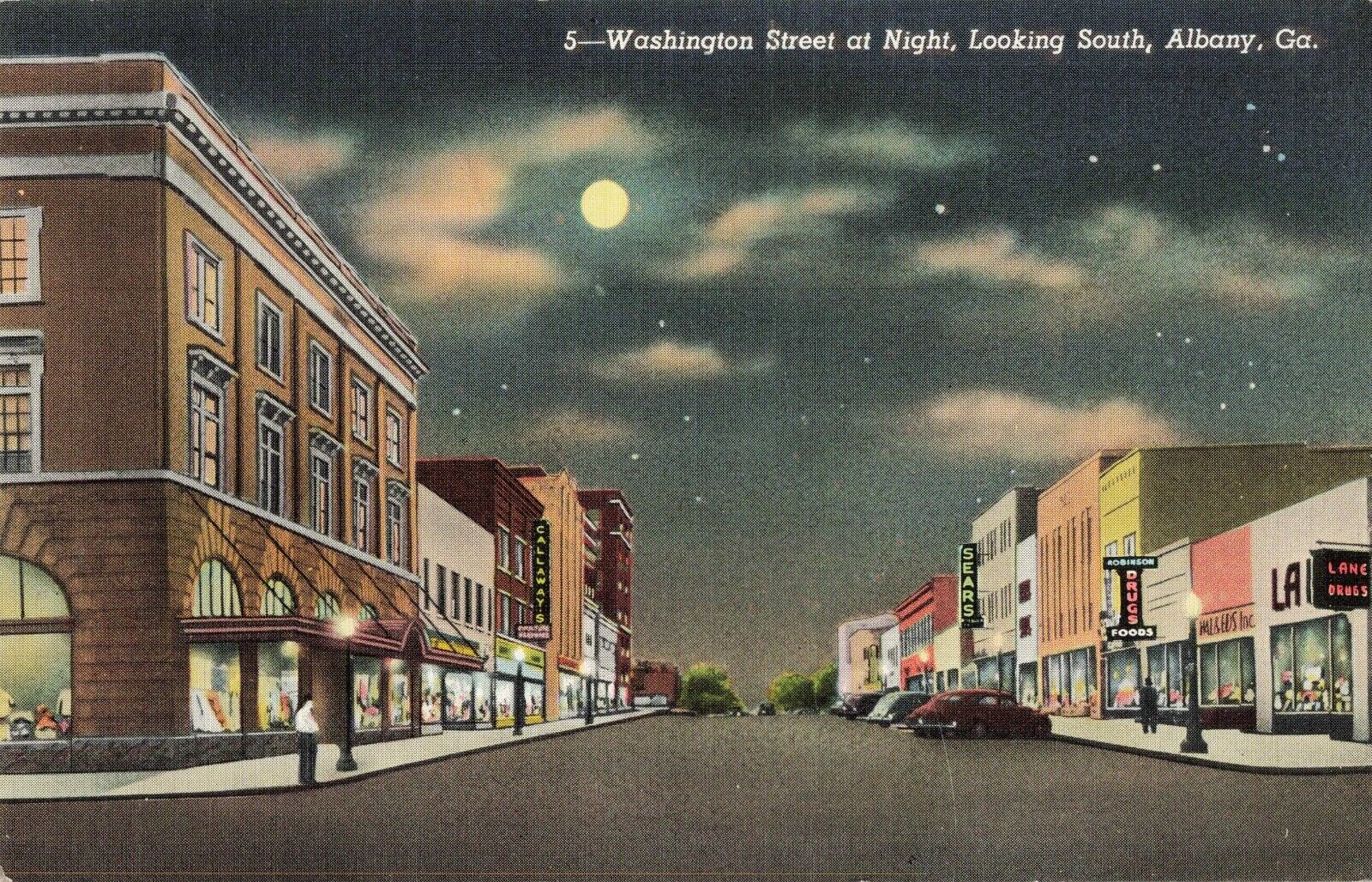
Albany in 1936

While integral to the economic life of the town, the Flint River has flooded regularly. It caused extensive property damage in 1841 and 1925. The city has also been subject to tornadoes. On February 10, 1940, a severe tornado hit Albany, killing eighteen people and causing large-scale damage.

==== 1940 tornado gallery ====
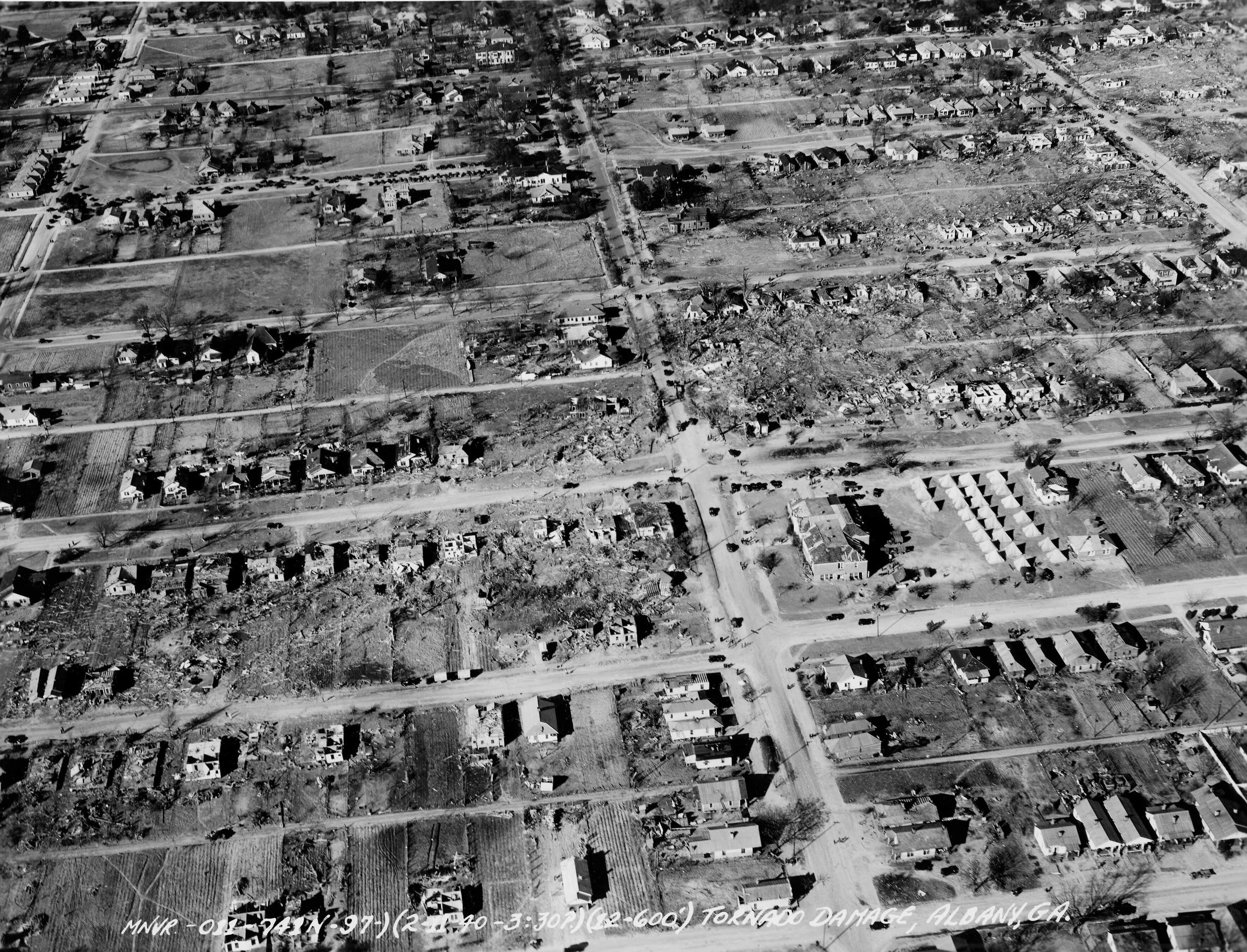

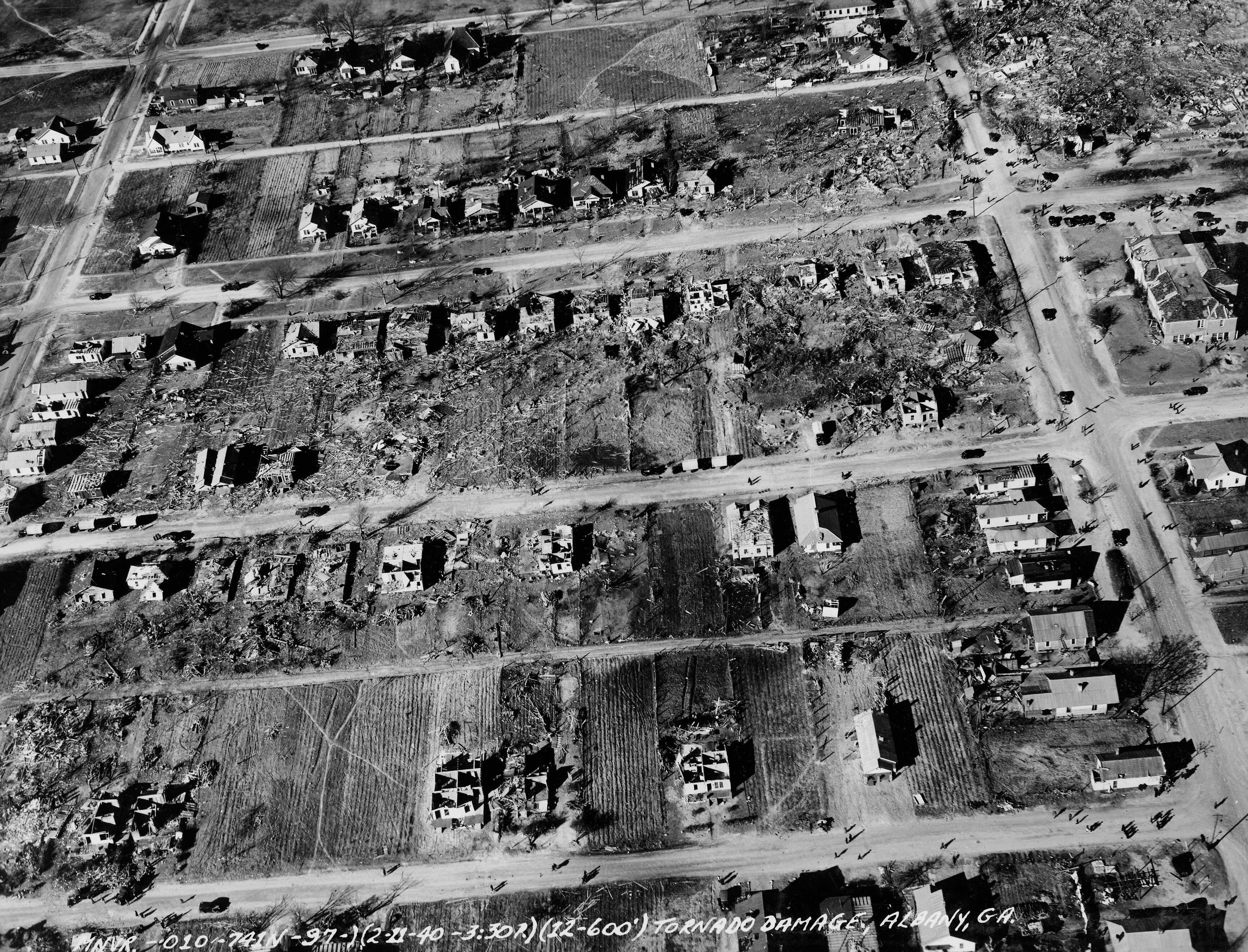

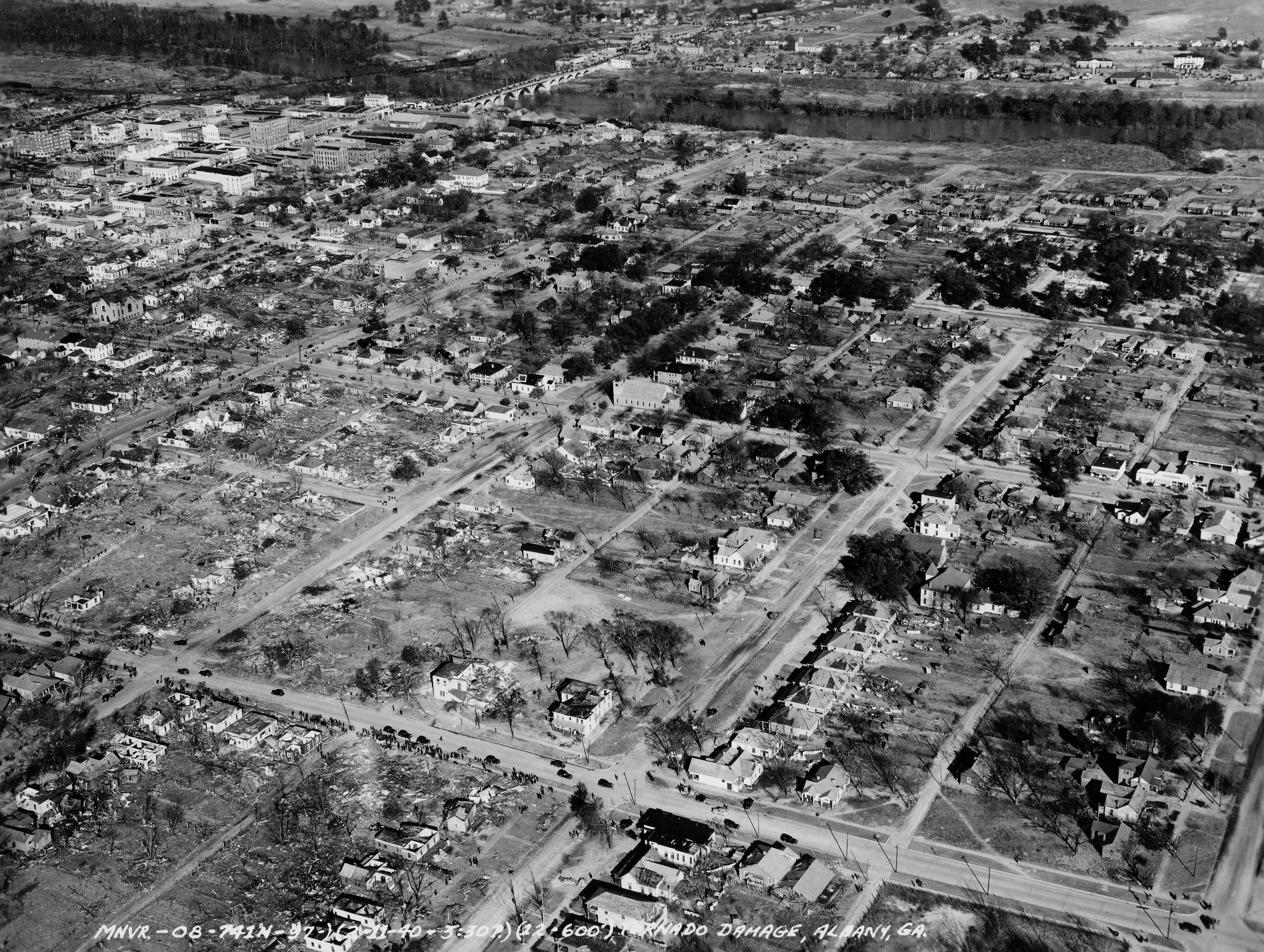

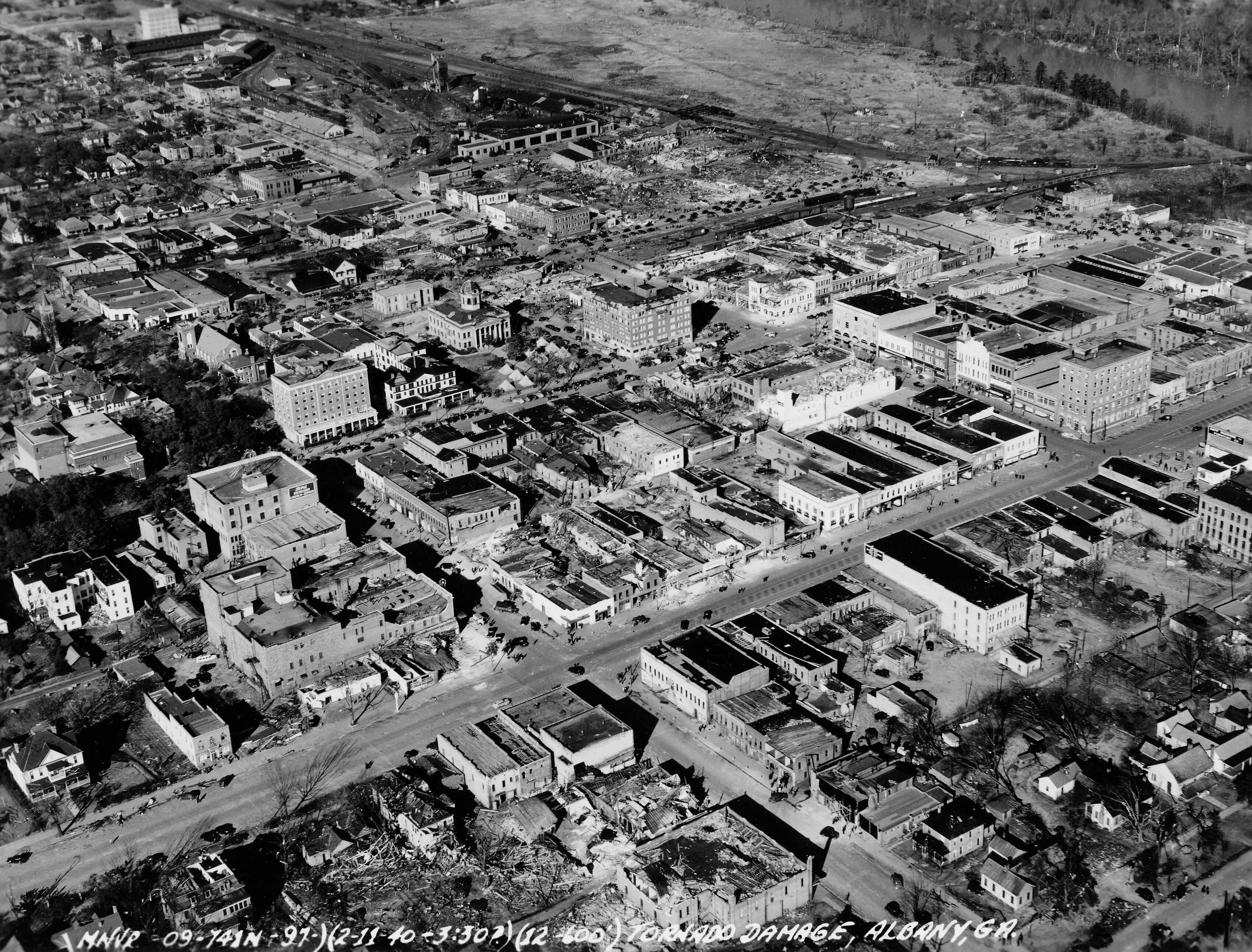

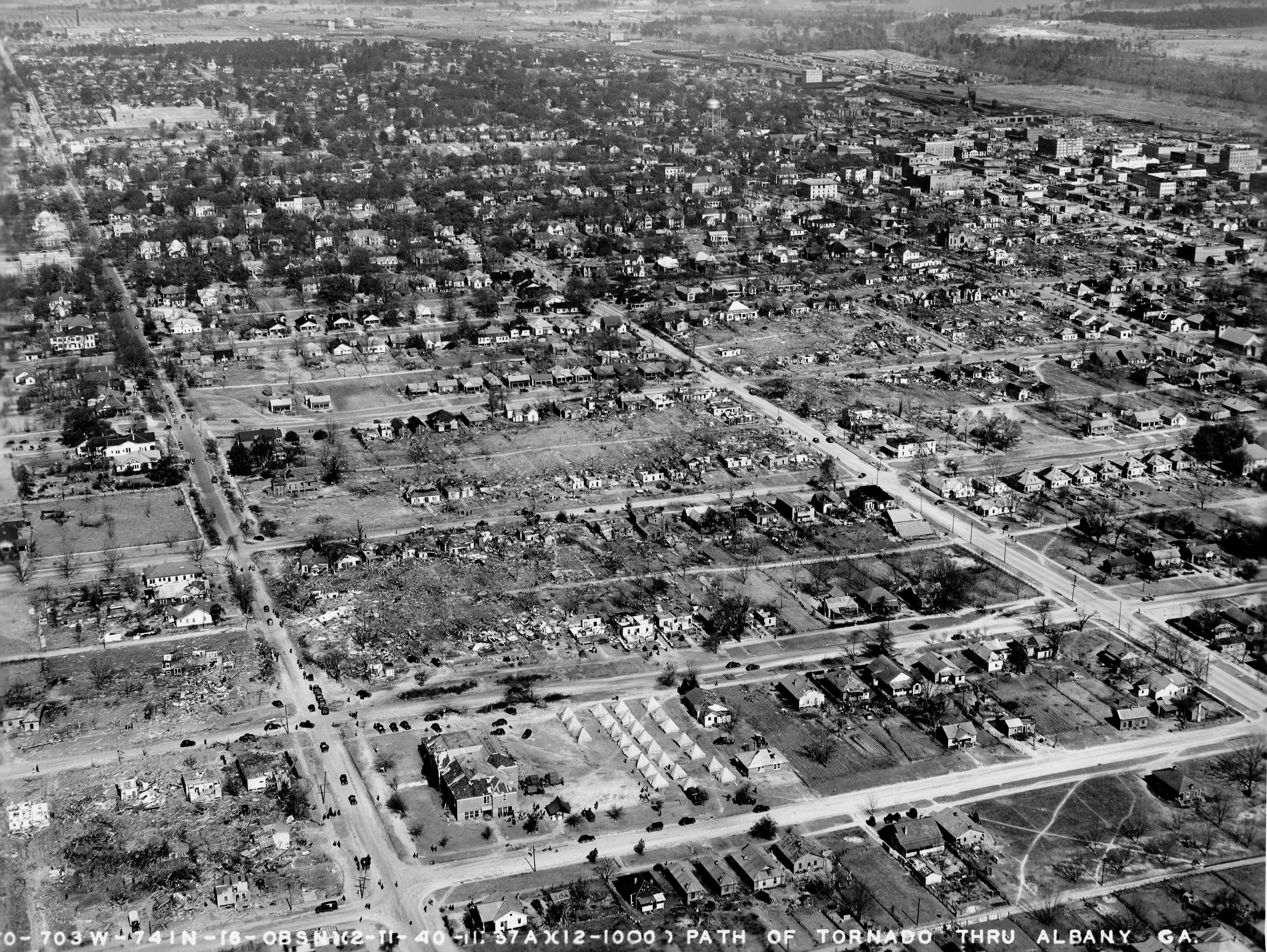

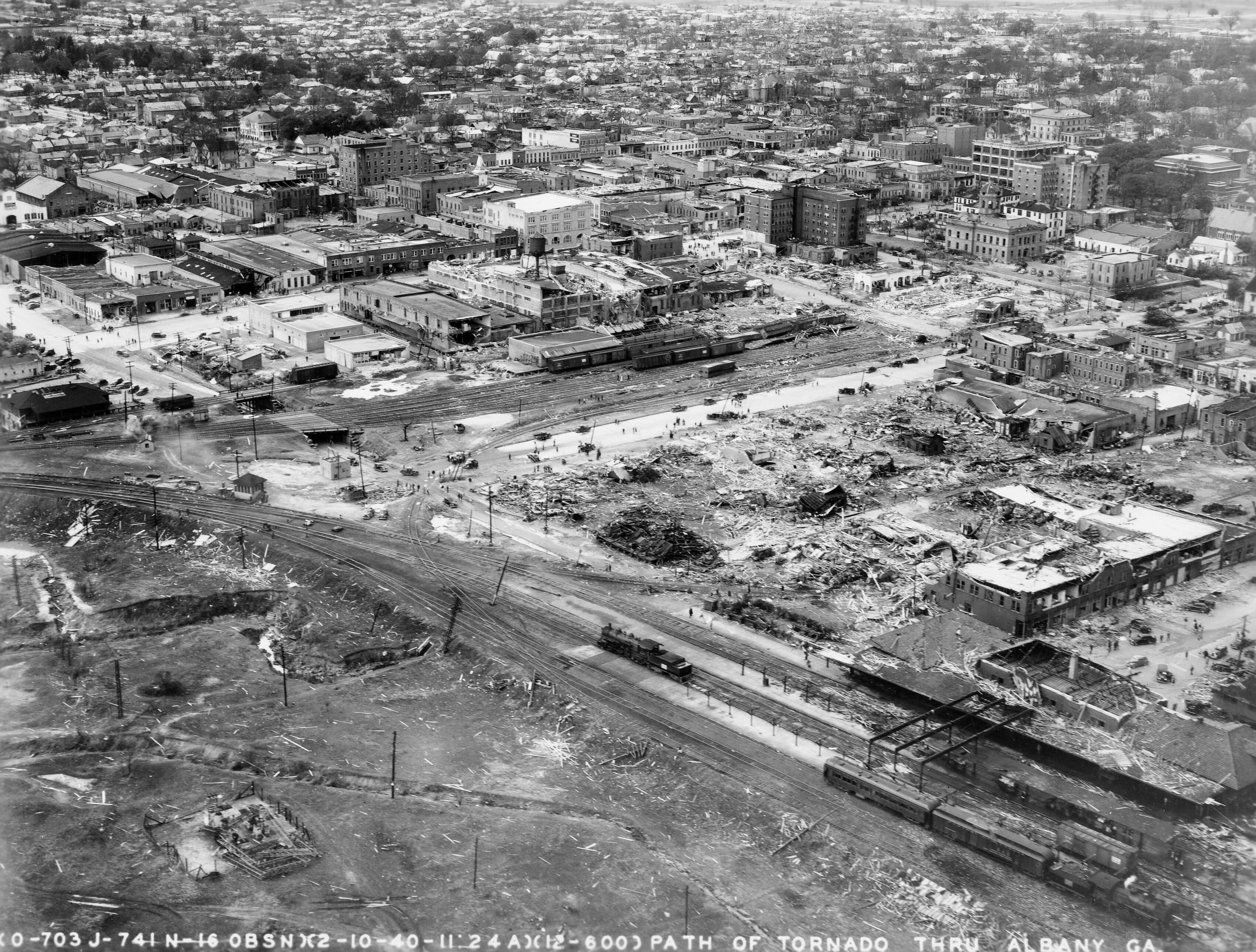

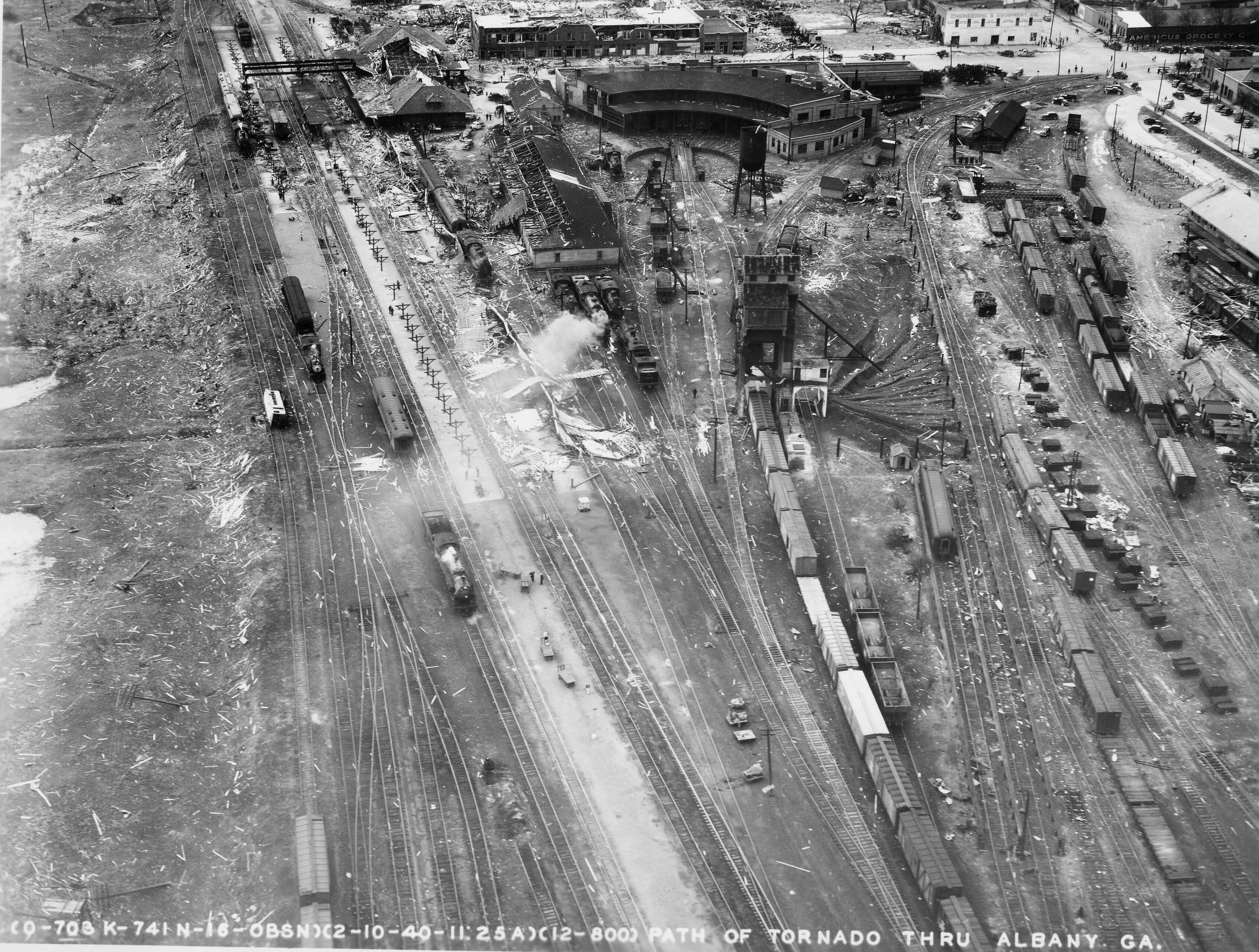

On April 11, 1906, the Carnegie Library, created by matching funds from the philanthropist Andrew Carnegie, was opened downtown. Originally a segregated facility under Jim Crow laws, it was not open to African Americans until after the passage of the Civil Rights Act of 1964. It functioned as a library through 1985. In 1992, after renovation, the building was reopened as the headquarters of the Albany Area Arts Council.

In 1912, the downtown U.S. Post Office and courthouse building opened. Other federal projects have been important to the city and region. In 1937, Chehaw Park was constructed as a part of a New Deal program under the administration of President Franklin D. Roosevelt during the Great Depression.

Major changes came with the expansion of military facilities in the city, secured by the powerful Southern Block in Congress. A U.S. Army Air Corps training base was built near Albany on land owned by the city and leased to the Air Corps for $1 a year. Construction of the base and airfield by the Army Corps of Engineers began on March 25, 1941. After being used during World War II, the airfield was temporarily deactivated between August 15, 1946, and September 1, 1947.

After the beginning of the Cold War and the founding of the U.S. Air Force in late 1947, the airfield was reactivated and upgraded with runways for a U.S. Air Force base. It was named Turner Air Force Base. The Air Force used this base for heavy bomber jets, such as the B-52 Stratofortress. A number of other Air Force units were also housed at this base. Among them were the 1370th Photomapping Group, and refueling and maintenance functions.

In 1951, the U.S. Marine Corps established a logistics base on the eastern outskirts of Albany. During the 1950s and 1960s, so many white servicemen and associated workers arrived that the city briefly became majority white for the first time since 1870.

In 1960, the population of Albany reached 50,000 people. During 1961–1962, African Americans in Albany played a prominent role in the Civil Rights Movement (see the Albany Movement). They led protests and non-violent demonstrations to end segregation of public facilities, gain the right to vote, and advance social justice. Assisted by activists from SCLC, CORE, SNCC, and the NAACP, African Americans and supporters took a stand to fight segregation through nonviolence. The city repealed its Jim Crow laws in 1963, but African Americans did not recover the ability to exercise their voting rights until Congress passed enforcement authority with the Voting Rights Act of 1965.

In 1967, the Air Force closed all its operations at the base, which was transferred to the U.S. Navy and renamed Naval Air Station Albany. NAS Albany was used as the shore base of nearly all the Navy's RA-5C Vigilante twin-jet, carrier-based reconnaissance aircraft. In 1974, the base was closed and the property was returned to the city.

In 1979, the Miller Brewing Company purchased part of the old naval base's property to build a new brewery.

The decline in military bases and railroad restructuring nationwide both led to job losses in the Albany area. Much of the remaining white population moved to suburbs and newer housing out of the city, which became majority African American in the 1970s. Struggling with a poor economy, in 1988 Albany made national headlines as the "Murder Capital of America", with the highest murder rate per capita in the United States. Other cities have since taken that title.

Some late twentieth-century floods have been extreme. In 1994, a severe flood was caused by rainfall from Tropical Storm Alberto; it killed 14 people and displaced 22,000. The state supported a $150 million renovation of the Albany State University campus to repair storm damage and complete upgrades. New housing was built on the south side of town to replace what had been destroyed. In 1998, the Flint River crested at 35 feet (11 m) above its bed and flooded parts of the city.

Because of such flooding, the city has decided against redeveloping areas along the riverfront floodplain for commercial or residential purposes. This area is being improved for other uses, with a riverfront walkway and a new aquarium built over a tributary creek.

On January 2 and 22, 2017, violent tornadoes passed through the area, claiming several lives and destroying mobile home parks in the process. One of those tornadoes was a large EF3 tornado that struck the south side of town, killing 5 people. On October 10, 2018 Hurricane Michael, the first major hurricane (Category 3+) to directly impact Georgia since the 1890s, plowed through South Georgia leaving widespread devastation in its path.

== Geography ==
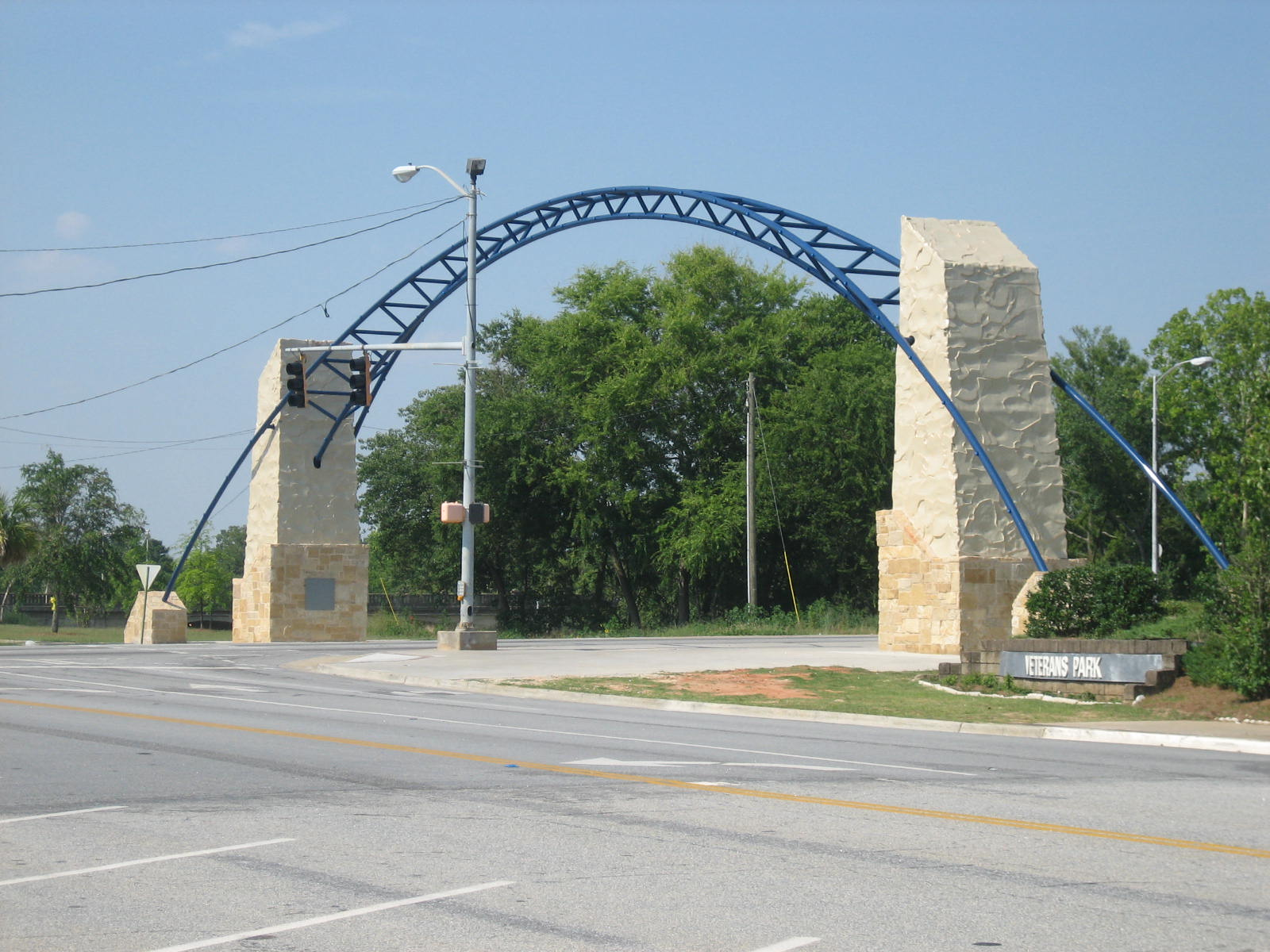
The new archway over Oglethorpe Boulevard at Front Street welcomes visitors to downtown Albany.

Albany is located at (31.582273, −84.165557), within Southwest Georgia. It lies in a belt of historically rich farmland in the East Gulf coastal plain, on the banks of the Flint River. The city is 78 mi (126 km) southeast of Columbus, 151 mi (243 km) south of Atlanta, 45 mi (72 km) south of Americus, 93 mi (150 km) southwest of Macon, 39 mi (63 km) west of Tifton, 73 mi (117 km) northwest of Valdosta, 88 mi (142 km) north of Tallahassee, Florida, 70 mi (110 km) east of Eufaula, Alabama, and 84 mi (135 km) east of Dothan, Alabama.

As of 2010, the city of Albany had been a member of the Arbor Day Foundation's Tree City USA Program for 23 years. Tree-lined streets are common, with large, mature oaks and other native trees. The city has a tree ordinance, and a certified arborist on staff.

=== Climate ===
The climate in this area is characterized by hot, humid summers and generally mild to cool winters. According to the Köppen Climate Classification system, Albany has a humid subtropical climate, abbreviated "Cfa" on climate maps. Albany receives well above the national average amount of precipitation. Much of this comes in the form of heavy showers and thunderstorms. According to "Cities Ranked and Rated" (Bert Sperling and Peter Sander), Albany reports thunder on 86 days per year. This is more than twice the national average.

Climate data for Albany, Georgia (1991–2020 normals, extremes 1891–present)
Month	Jan	Feb	Mar	Apr	May	Jun	Jul	Aug	Sep	Oct	Nov	Dec	Year
Record high °F (°C)	86 (30)	87 (31)	93 (34)	97 (36)	102 (39)	106 (41)	107 (42)	104 (40)	106 (41)	99 (37)	90 (32)	88 (31)	107 (42)
Mean maximum °F (°C)	77.4 (25.2)	80.3 (26.8)	85.1 (29.5)	89.2 (31.8)	95.3 (35.2)	97.9 (36.6)	98.9 (37.2)	98.2 (36.8)	95.9 (35.5)	90.3 (32.4)	84.0 (28.9)	78.8 (26.0)	100.4 (38.0)
Mean daily maximum °F (°C)	59.5 (15.3)	63.8 (17.7)	70.8 (21.6)	77.6 (25.3)	84.8 (29.3)	89.3 (31.8)	91.6 (33.1)	90.6 (32.6)	86.8 (30.4)	78.7 (25.9)	69.3 (20.7)	62.3 (16.8)	77.1 (25.1)
Daily mean °F (°C)	48.4 (9.1)	52.2 (11.2)	58.5 (14.7)	65.2 (18.4)	73.1 (22.8)	79.3 (26.3)	81.9 (27.7)	81.1 (27.3)	76.9 (24.9)	67.4 (19.7)	57.1 (13.9)	51.2 (10.7)	66.0 (18.9)
Mean daily minimum °F (°C)	37.3 (2.9)	40.5 (4.7)	46.2 (7.9)	52.8 (11.6)	61.5 (16.4)	69.3 (20.7)	72.2 (22.3)	71.7 (22.1)	67.0 (19.4)	56.1 (13.4)	44.9 (7.2)	40.1 (4.5)	55.0 (12.8)
Mean minimum °F (°C)	21.5 (−5.8)	25.2 (−3.8)	30.4 (−0.9)	38.3 (3.5)	49.1 (9.5)	62.0 (16.7)	67.0 (19.4)	65.4 (18.6)	55.4 (13.0)	40.0 (4.4)	29.1 (−1.6)	24.9 (−3.9)	19.5 (−6.9)
Record low °F (°C)	1 (−17)	11 (−12)	10 (−12)	27 (−3)	39 (4)	46 (8)	57 (14)	56 (13)	37 (3)	28 (−2)	14 (−10)	6 (−14)	1 (−17)
Average precipitation inches (mm)	4.78 (121)	4.72 (120)	4.88 (124)	3.92 (100)	3.03 (77)	5.24 (133)	5.50 (140)	5.69 (145)	4.03 (102)	3.04 (77)	3.04 (77)	4.68 (119)	52.55 (1,335)
Average precipitation days (≥ 0.01 in)	9.6	9.0	8.4	7.0	6.2	11.7	11.8	12.2	7.6	6.1	6.6	9.1	105.3
Source: NOAA

== Demographics ==
Historical population
Census	Pop.	Note	%±
1860	1,618		—
1870	2,101		29.9%
1880	3,216		53.1%
1890	4,008		24.6%
1900	4,606		14.9%
1910	8,190		77.8%
1920	11,555		41.1%
1930	14,507		25.5%
1940	19,055		31.4%
1950	31,155		63.5%
1960	55,890		79.4%
1970	72,623		29.9%
1980	74,425		2.5%
1990	78,122		5.0%
2000	76,939		−1.5%
2010	77,434		0.6%
2020	69,647		−10.1%
2025 (est.)	66,907	▼	−3.9%
U.S. Decennial Census; 1850-1870 1870-1880; 1890-1910 1920-1930; 1940 1950 1960; 1970 1980 1990; 2000 2010; 2025

=== Racial and ethnic composition ===
Albany city, Georgia – Racial and ethnic composition Note: the US Census treats Hispanic/Latino as an ethnic category. This table excludes Latinos from the racial categories and assigns them to a separate category. Hispanics/Latinos may be of any race.
Race / Ethnicity (NH = Non-Hispanic)	Pop 2000	Pop 2010	Pop 2020	% 2000	% 2010	% 2020
White alone (NH)	25,193	19,020	13,724	32.74%	24.56%	19.71%
Black or African American alone (NH)	49,643	55,210	51,952	64.52%	71.30%	74.59%
Native American or Alaska Native alone (NH)	139	131	89	0.18%	0.17%	0.13%
Asian alone (NH)	451	622	508	0.59%	0.80%	0.73%
Native Hawaiian or Pacific Islander alone (NH)	20	42	13	0.03%	0.05%	0.02%
Other race alone (NH)	66	76	168	0.09%	0.10%	0.24%
Mixed race or Multiracial (NH)	477	737	1,549	0.62%	0.95%	2.22%
Hispanic or Latino (any race)	950	1,596	1,644	1.23%	2.06%	2.36%
Total	76,939	77,434	69,647	100.00%	100.00%	100.00%

=== 2020 census ===
As of the 2020 census, Albany had a population of 69,647. The median age was 36.1 years. 23.4% of residents were under the age of 18 and 16.1% of residents were 65 years of age or older. For every 100 females there were 82.7 males, and for every 100 females age 18 and over there were 77.0 males age 18 and over.

At the 1860 U.S. census, the city's population was 1,618. Its population has increased to a historic high of 78,122.

98.5% of residents lived in urban areas, while 1.5% lived in rural areas.

There were 28,640 households in Albany, of which 29.4% had children under the age of 18 living in them. Of all households, 25.0% were married-couple households, 22.2% were households with a male householder and no spouse or partner present, and 46.0% were households with a female householder and no spouse or partner present. About 36.6% of all households were made up of individuals and 13.2% had someone living alone who was 65 years of age or older.

There were 33,290 housing units, of which 14.0% were vacant. The homeowner vacancy rate was 2.3% and the rental vacancy rate was 10.4%.

Racially and ethnically, Albany forms a part of the Black Belt. The racial and ethnic composition in 2020 was 74.59% Black or African American, 19.71% non-Hispanic white, 0.13% Native American, 0.73% Asian, 0.02% Native Hawaiian or other Pacific Islander, 2.47% other or multiracial, and 2.36% Hispanic or Latino of any race.

=== American Community Survey ===
According to the American Community Survey of 2022, its racial and ethnic makeup was 75% African American, 19% White, 1% Asian, 2% multiracial, and 3% Hispanic or Latino of any race.

At the 2022 American Community Survey, the city had a median age of 34.7. There was an average of 2.3 persons per household and 27,608 housing units. Approximately 33% were married couples, 19% non-family households, 40% female households, and 7% male households. An estimated 36% of the city population was married.

Among its relatively young population, the city had a median household income of $39,422 with a per capita income of $22,115. More than 60% of the population earned less than $50,000 annually, and 27% earned from $50,000 to $100,000 a year. Of the population, 33.8% lived at or below the poverty line, and 55% of children under age 18 are considered to be in poverty. Approximately 15% of adults 65 and older were considered in poverty.

== Economy ==
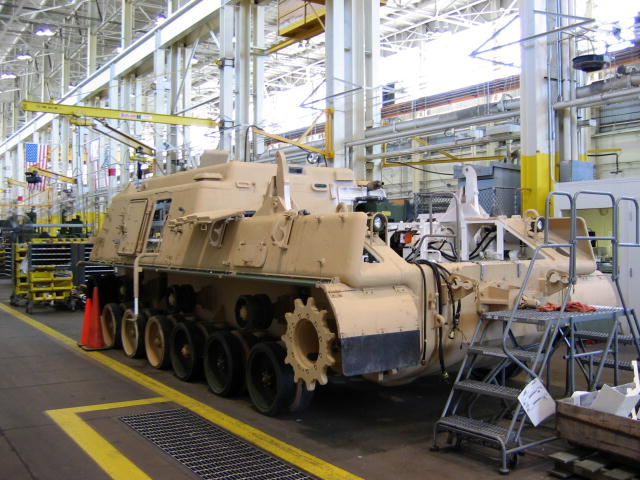
An M88 Recovery Vehicle at the Marine Corps Logistics Base Albany undergoes depot maintenance in 2005.

Today, although the city is surrounded by pecan groves, pine trees, farms and plantations, almost none of the population is employed in agriculture. It has become heavily industrialized, and most business is conducted on a multinational scale. The city developed on both sides of the Flint River.

Health care, education and the Marine Corps Logistics Base Albany are the largest employers. Manufacturing, transportation, and retail trade are also important foundations of Albany's economy, and the city acts as a hub for commerce in southwest Georgia.

On December 17, 2008, Cooper Tire and Rubber, one of Albany's largest employers, announced plans to close the local manufacturing facility. Approximately 1,400 employees at the plant were projected to lose their jobs.

As a result of the Great Recession, unemployment remained higher in Albany than the country average. In 2012 Albany continued to add more new jobs while other portions of the state were trying to stem the tide of unemployment.

Albany has a skilled workforce, makes continual upgrades to its infrastructure, and has improvements in public safety, such as its ISO fire rating of 2. It has numerous economic development initiatives, such as an Opportunity Zone, which offers a $3,500 tax credit per job created.

== Arts and culture ==
The manager of a local movie theater was convicted in Jenkins v. Georgia (1972) of "distributing obscene material" for showing the film Carnal Knowledge, a popular movie directed by Mike Nichols and starring Jack Nicholson, Art Garfunkel, Ann-Margret, and Candice Bergen.

=== Museums and the arts ===
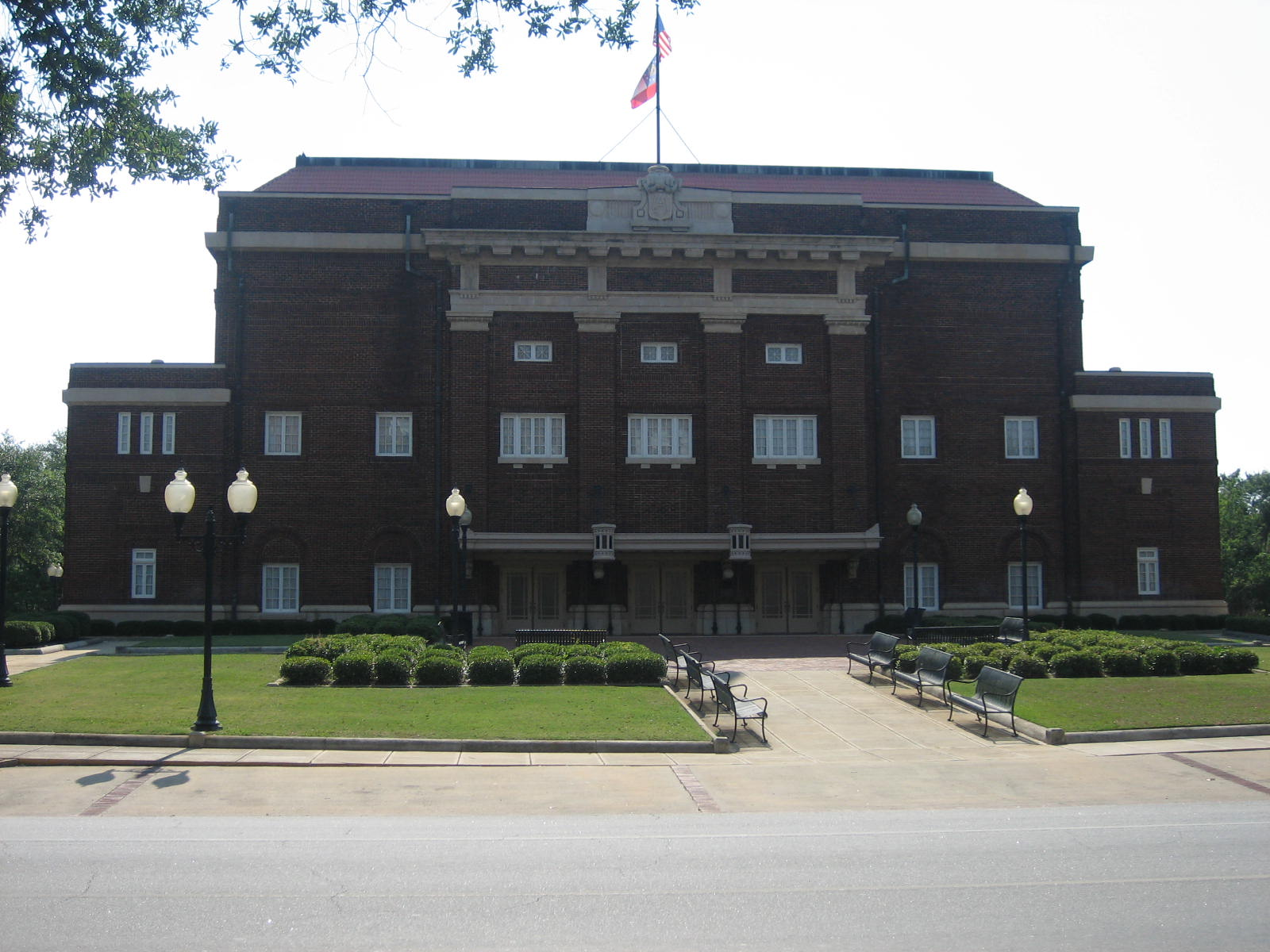
Albany Municipal Auditorium

Ray Charles statue, the centerpiece of Ray Charles Plaza

Ray Charles Plaza in Downtown Albany

- Albany Area Arts Council
- The Albany Chorale
- Albany Civic Center
- Albany Civil Rights Institute
- The Albany Concert Association
- Albany Municipal Auditorium
- Albany Museum of Art
- The Albany Symphony Orchestra
- Ballet Theatre South
- Flint RiverQuarium
- Chehaw Park & Zoo
- RiverQuarium Imagination Theater
- Theatre Albany
- Thronateeska Heritage Center
- Weatherbee Planetarium

=== Registered historic places ===
- Albany District Pecan Growers' Exchange
- Albany Housefurnishing Company
- Albany Municipal Auditorium
- Albany Railroad Depot Historic District
- Bridge House
- Carnegie Library of Albany
- Davis-Exchange Bank Building
- John A. Davis House
- Mount Zion Baptist Church
- New Albany Hotel
- Old St. Teresa's Catholic Church
- Rosenberg Brothers Department Store
- St. Nicholas Hotel
- Samuel Farkas House
- Tift Park
- U.S. Post Office and Courthouse
- Union Station Depot
- W. E. Smith House

== Sports ==
- Albany was home to the Albany Polecats, who were a low-A class team that played in the South Atlantic League between 1992 and 1995. Albany was also home to the South Georgia Peanuts, who played in the South Coast League. They won the South Coast League championships in the league's inaugural season (2007) and were managed by former MLB shortstop Wally Backman. The league folded after that season.
- The Albany Panthers were an indoor football team based in Albany, Georgia. The team joined the Southern Indoor Football League (SIFL) during their inaugural season in 2010. When the SIFL folded, the team joined the Professional Indoor Football League in 2012. The Panthers' home games were played at the James H. Gray Civic Center until 2014.
- The Georgia Firebirds were an indoor football team that played in various semi-pro leagues as well as the professional American Indoor Football in 2016 and the National Arena League in 2017.
- Albany is home to Sowegans SC, an amateur soccer team founded in 2023 and competing in the Gulf Coast Premier League. The team hosts home matches at Westover Comprehensive High School.

== Memorials and sights ==
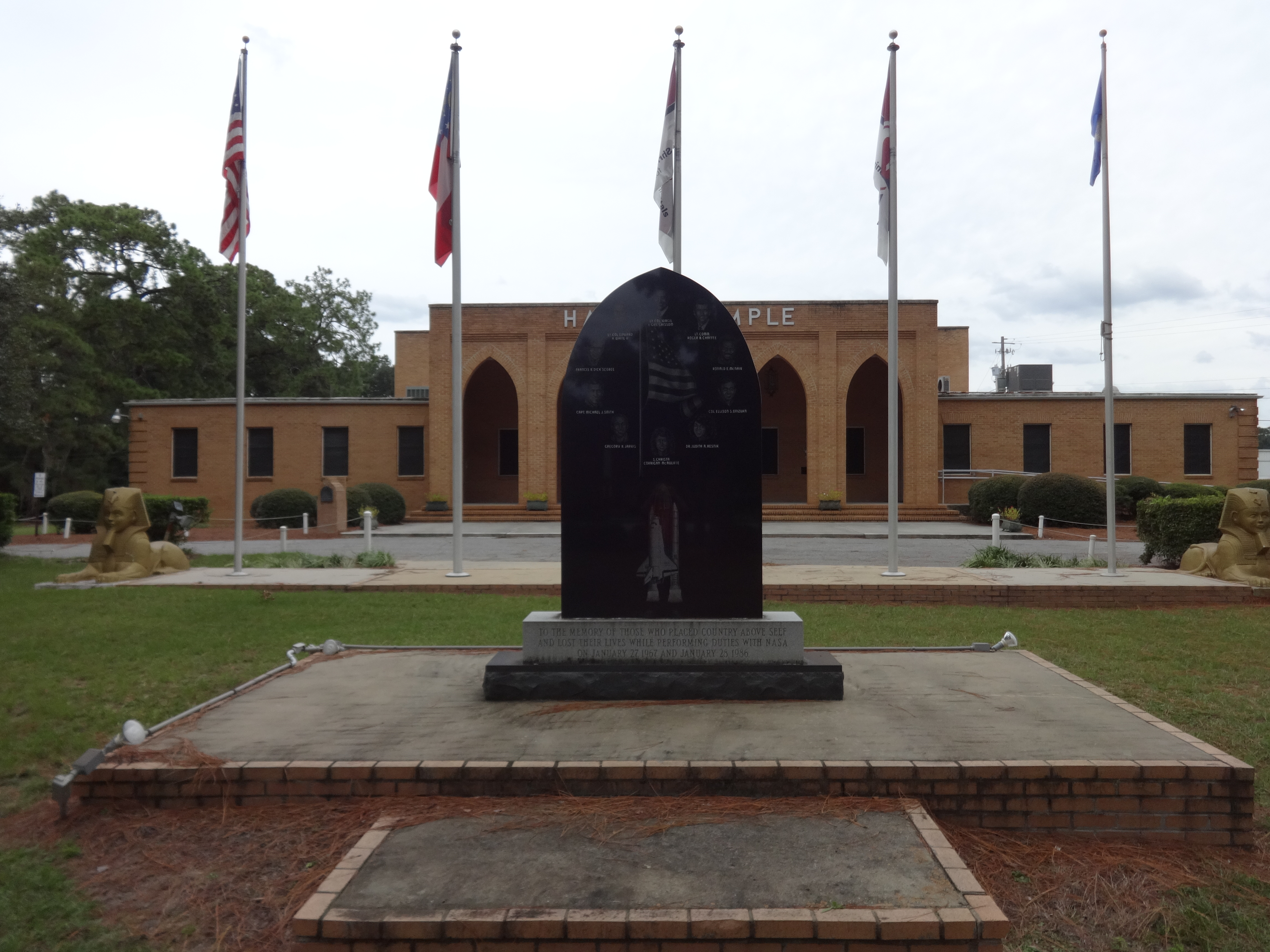
Astronauts Memorial, Albany

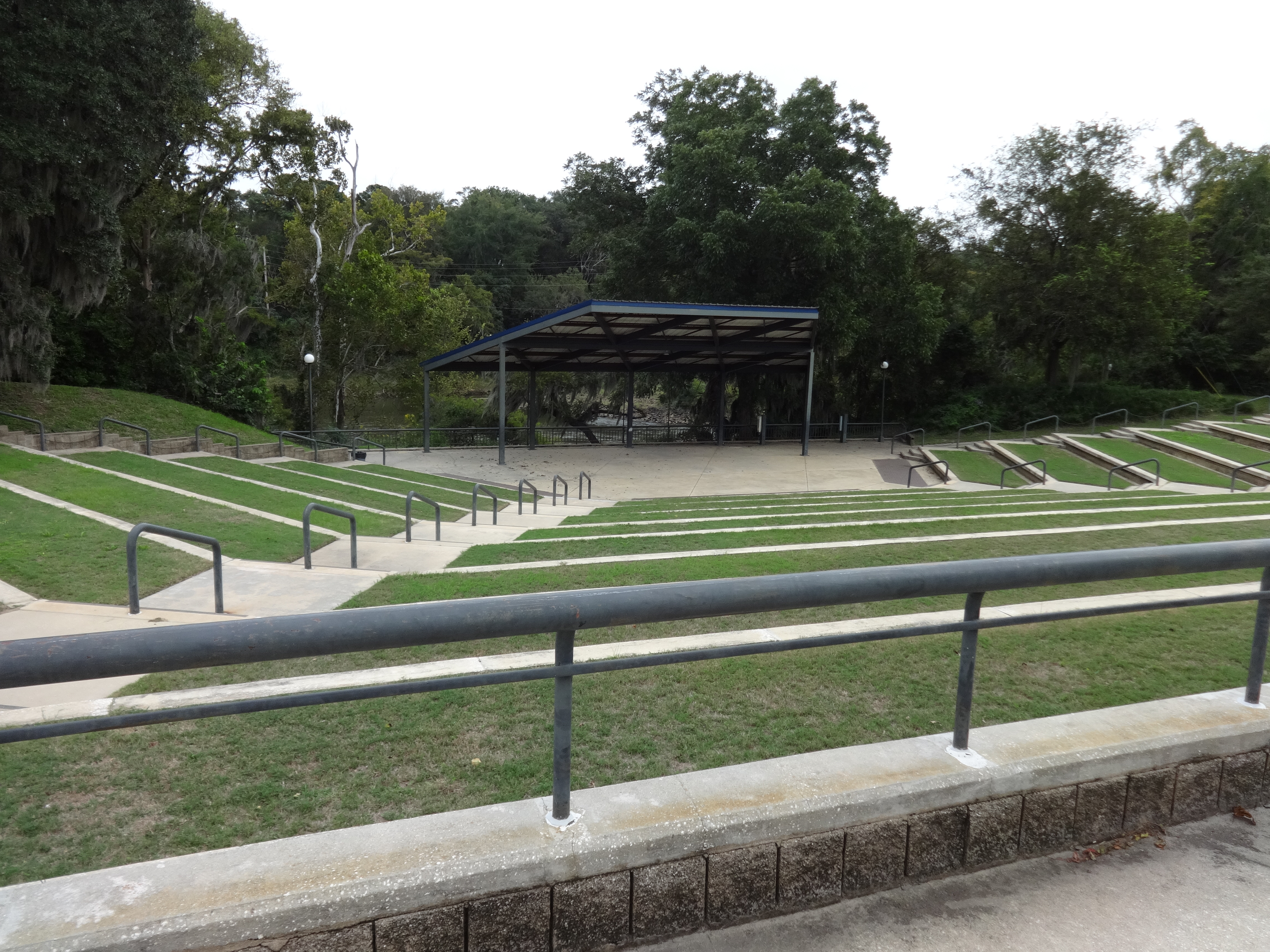
Amphitheater in Veterans Park, Albany

- Albany Civil Rights Memorial
- Albany Railroad Depot Historic District
- Astronauts Memorial
- Confederate Memorial Park
- The Flint Riverquarium
- Freedom Flame
- Freedom Walk
- The Guardian
- Radium Springs – one of the Seven Natural Wonders of Georgia
- Ray Charles Plaza
- RiverFront Park
- Royal Air Force Memorial
- Veterans Park

== Festivals and events ==
City races include a 26.2-mile (42.2 km) full marathon or a 13.1-mile (21.1 km) half marathon. The full race is ranked as one of the top Boston Marathon qualifiers in the country, with almost 20% of all marathon finishers qualifying.

The annual Mardi Gras Street Festival takes place in downtown Albany the first weekend of March. Starting at noon and running until midnight, the festival coincides with the marathon and half marathon.

== Government ==
The new federal courthouse in downtown Albany is dedicated in honor of the civil rights attorney C.B. King of Georgia.

Elected officials include a mayor and six city commissioners, each of whom serves a four-year term. The commissioners are elected from single-member districts. An appointed city manager acts as the chief administrative officer. The city has been governed by a city commission and city manager since January 14, 1924.

The city government places responsibility for specific features into several departments.

== Education ==
=== Public schools ===
The Dougherty County School System operates a system of five learning centers, fourteen public elementary schools, four public middle schools, three public high schools, and one alternative school. All schools are accredited by the Southern Association of Colleges and Schools (SACS) and the Georgia Accrediting Commission (GAC). The system had an enrollment in 2009–2010 of 15,838 students being taught by 1,070 teachers and 198 support and administrative personnel.

The following schools have distinctions:

- Alice Coachman Elementary School: 2009 National Blue Ribbon School, 2009 "No Excuses School" (Georgia Public Policy Foundation)
- Lincoln Elementary Magnet School: 2009–2010 Governor's Office of Students Achievement Bronze Award for Highest Percentage of Students Meeting & Exceeding Standards on the CRCT
- International Studies Elementary Charter School: Title 1 Distinguished School (10 consecutive years making AYP)
- Robert A. Cross Middle Magnet School: 2009–2010 Governor's Office of Students Achievement Gold Award for Highest Percentage of Students Meeting & Exceeding Standards on the CRCT

=== Private schools ===
Several private schools provide primary and secondary education, including:

- Byne Memorial Baptist School (BMBS)
- Deerfield-Windsor School (DWS)
- God's Foundation Christian Academy (GFCA), (formerly known as New Beginning Christian School)
- St. Teresa's Catholic School (STS) (Closed in 2025)
- Sherwood Christian Academy (SCA)
- Christian Covenant Academy (CCA)

=== Higher education ===
==== Albany State University ====
The city is the location of Albany State University, founded as a pre-collegiate school in 1903. African Americans in the South had been intent since emancipation in gaining education and, by the turn of the 20th century, most were literate, as documented by W. E. B. Du Bois in his history, Black Reconstruction (1930). Albany State is notable as one of the few historically black colleges and universities to be part of the University System of Georgia.

==== Albany Technical College ====
Albany Technical College is part of the Technical College System of Georgia and teaches post-secondary vocational and occupational training subjects.

Georgia Military College (GMC) has a site at this campus and conducts some classes here.

==== Troy University ====
Albany is a site location of Troy University, one of many satellites which Troy has established throughout the Southeastern United States. For more than 20 years, Troy University, a public non-profit institution of Alabama, has taught classes both in-class and online in Albany. Troy's Albany site has classes in criminal justice, psychology and various general studies, along with offering other undergraduate and master's degree programs online.

=== Public libraries ===
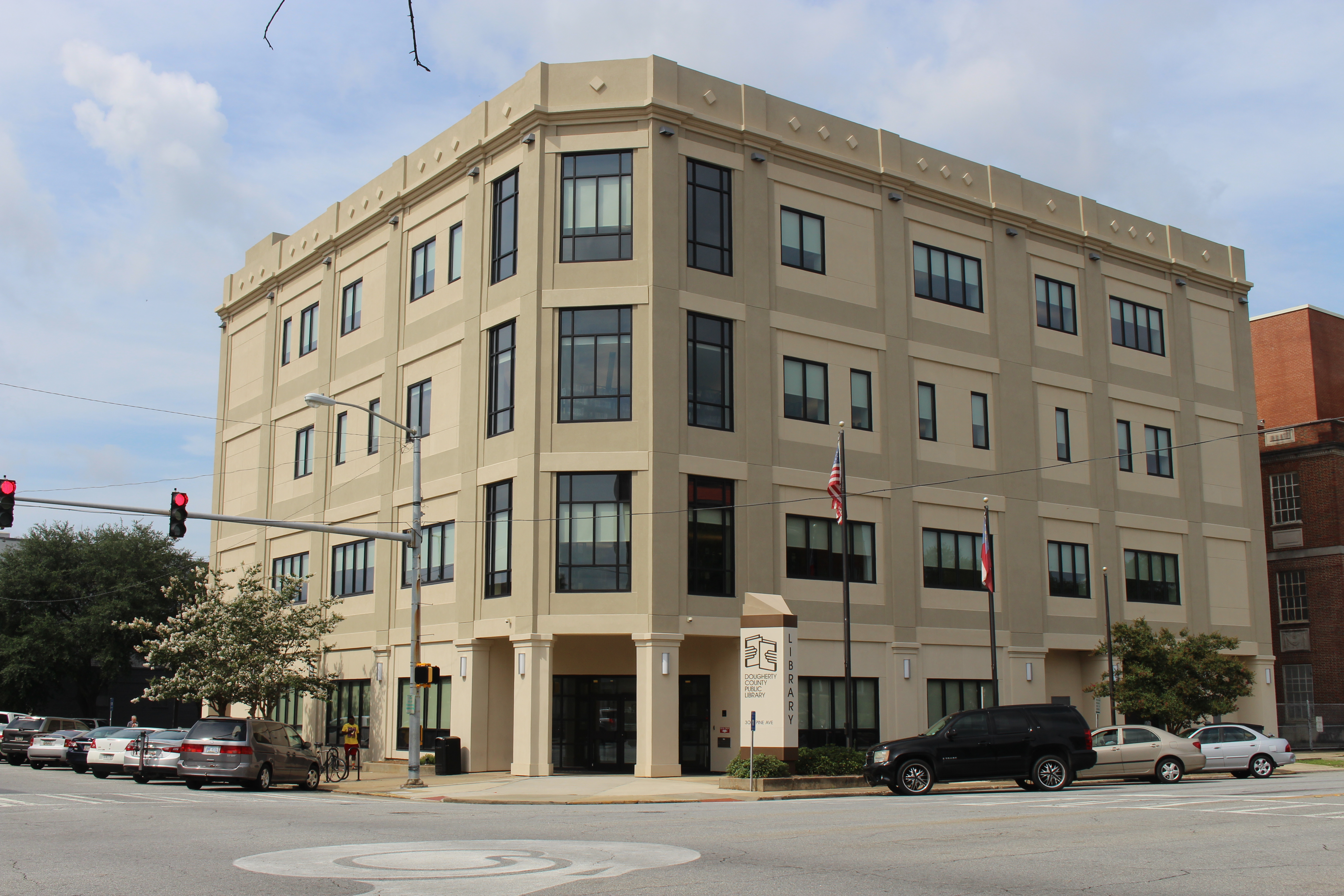
Dougherty County Public Library Central Library

Dougherty County Public Library operates the public libraries serving Albany. There are five branches, as well as a 'Library on Wheels' bookmobile.

== Media ==
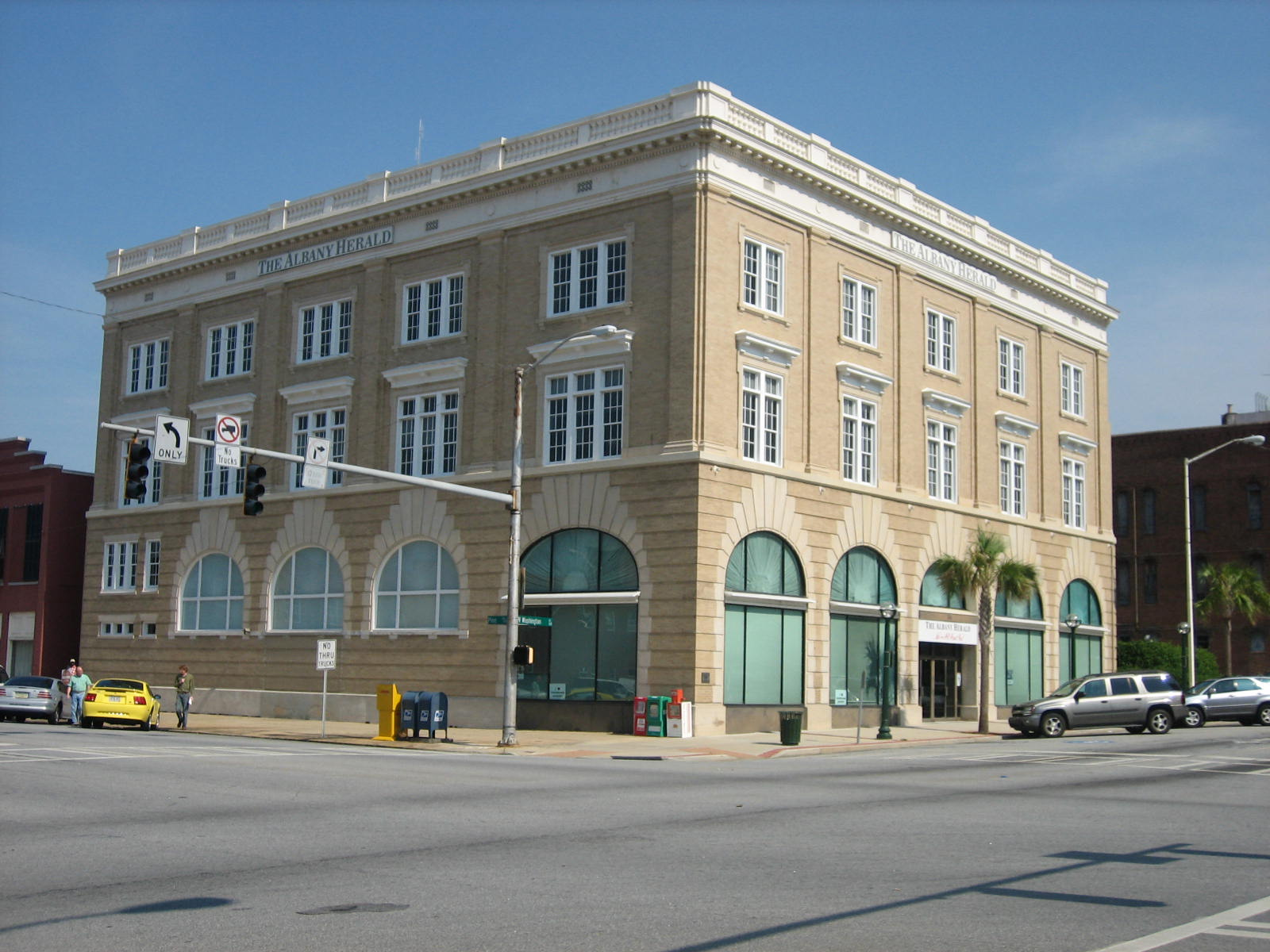
The Rosenberg Brothers Department Store, former headquarters of The Albany Herald

=== Newspapers ===
- The Albany Herald, founded in 1891
- The Albany Journal, published since 1939
- The Albany Southwest Georgian, historically black newspaper
- The Metro Gazette, offers positive news about the community

=== Television stations ===
- Channel 10 WALB (NBC)
- Channel 10.2 WALB-DT2 (ABC)
- Channel 14 WABW (PBS-GPB) (Pelham)
- Channel 25 WACS (PBS-GPB) (Dawson)
- Channel 31 WFXL (FOX)
- Channel 44 WSWG (CBS)
- Channel 44.2 WSWG-DT2 (MyNet-WSST)
- Channel 44.3 WSWG-DT3 (CW+)
- Channel 55 WSST (MyNet)

=== FM radio stations ===
- 88.5 W203AT (religious; translator for KEAR)
- 89.3 WBJY (religious)
- 90.3 WAEF (religious)
- 90.7 WWQA (religious, bluegrass)
- 91.7 WUNV (NPR – news, classical)
- 92.7 WASU (Albany State University – college, jazz, urban)
- 93.1 WSRD (religious, talk)
- 93.5 WMRG (hip-hop/R&B)
- 93.9 WMTM (Classic hits)
- 94.7 WDEC (hot adult contemporary)
- 96.3 WJIZ (urban)
- 97.3 WGEX "Power 97.3" (Top 40)
- 98.1 WMRZ "Kiss" (adult urban)
- 100.3 WOBB "B-100"(country)
- 101.3 WTOA-LP Catholic radio
- 101.7 WQVE "V101.7"(R&B, classic soul)
- 102.1 WJST "Retro FM 102.1" (classic hits)
- 102.5 W273AE (religious; translator for WYFK)
- 103.5 WJAD "Rock 103" (classic and mainstream rock) (Leesburg)
- 104.5 WKAK "Nash FM" (country) (formerly K-Country 104.5 as of June 2013)
- 105.5 WZBN "Power 105... The King" (holy hip hop and contemporary gospel)
- 106.1 WHKV (Christian contemporary)
- 106.5 WZIQ (Christian)
- 107.7 WNOU "107.7 Now-FM" (Hot adult contemporary)

=== AM radio stations ===
- 960 WJYZ (gospel)
- 1250 WSRA (ESPN sports)
- 1590 WALG (news, talk)

== Infrastructure ==
=== Transportation ===
==== Air ====
Southwest Georgia Regional Airport (ABY) is a non-hub commercial service airport with service to Atlanta by Endeavor Air, a regional carrier for Delta. Both UPS and DHL use the airport as a sorting facility. In 2010, a master plan was completed. It recommended moving forward with the Replacement Terminal Project.

==== Rail ====
Freight rail service is provided by Georgia Southwestern Railroad, Georgia and Florida Railway/Omnitrax, and Norfolk Southern Railway. Georgia and Florida Railway has its headquarters in Albany.

Several passenger trains from St. Louis, Chicago and Cincinnati in the Midwest, heading to Florida, made stops in Albany Union Station. The last of these, the Illinois Central's City of Miami made its final stop there in 1971.

==== Bus ====
Albany Transit System (ATS) has been operated by the city since 1974 and provides fixed-route and para-transit services in Albany and Dougherty County, including service to the airport. All buses are wheelchair accessible and are equipped with bicycle racks. The main transfer station is in downtown Albany, at the corner of Oglethorpe and Jackson.

In addition, a Greyhound bus station is located in downtown Albany, with connections to interstate service.

=== Transportation ===
While Albany is one of the largest cities in Georgia to not be served by an interstate, U.S. Route 19 and U.S. Route 82 provide thoroughfares through the city. The two join north of the city for a short freeway known as the Liberty Expressway. Other major highways that run through the city include Georgia State Route 91, Georgia State Route 133, Georgia State Route 234, and Georgia State Route 520. Albany is located on Georgia State Route 300 (Georgia-Florida Parkway), which provides easy access to Cordele, and Interstate 75 to the northeast and south to Camilla, and Thomasville. The Liberty Expressway spans 10 miles (16 km) serves as a bypass on Albany's north and east sides. Other highways that pass through Albany include US 19, US 82, and State Routes 3, 62, 91, 133, 234, and 520.

==== Bridges ====
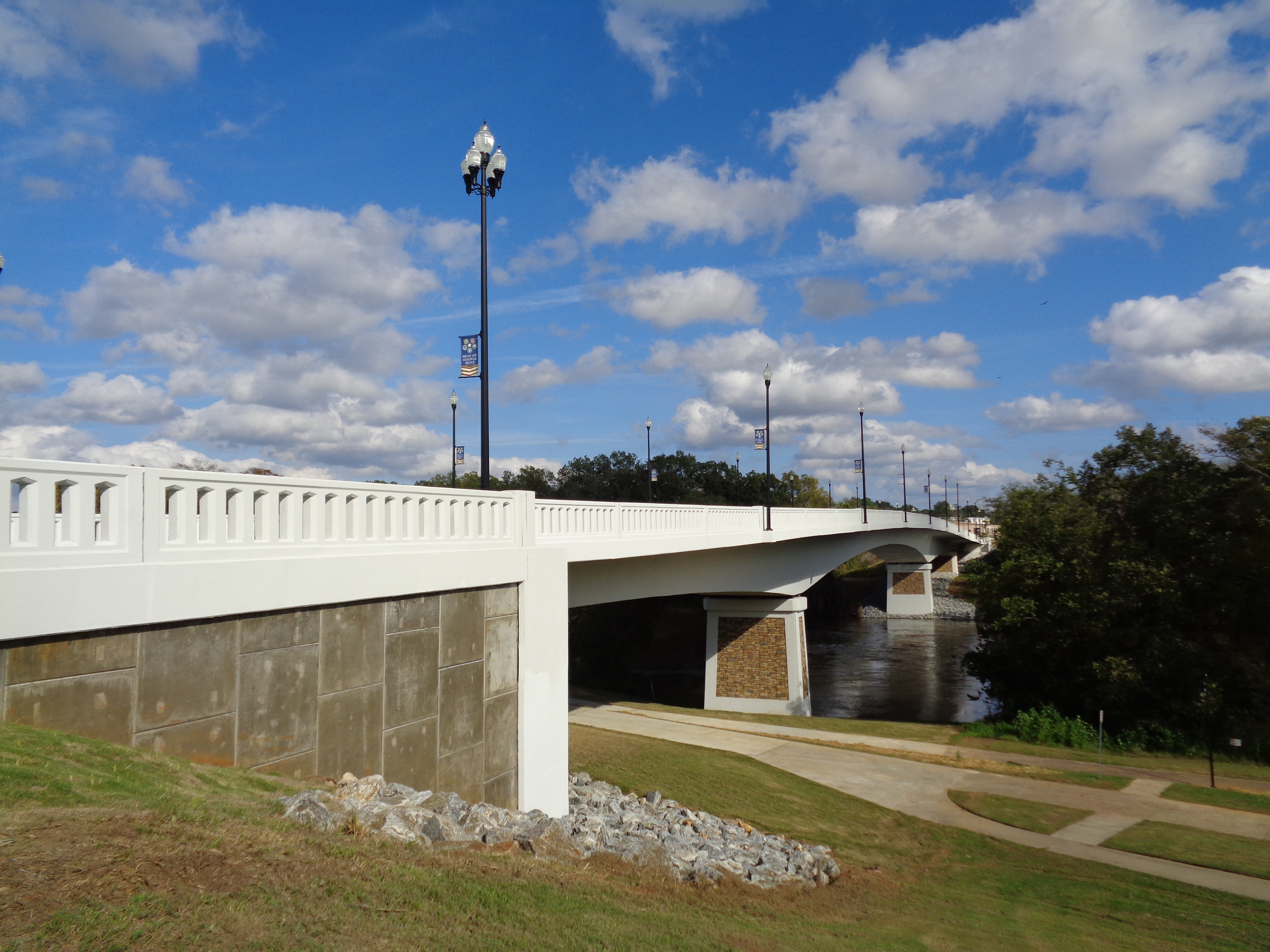
Broad Avenue Memorial Bridge

Albany's Broad Avenue Memorial bridge, constructed in 1920 and comprising three open-spandrel concrete deck arch main spans and eight closed-spandrel deck arch spans, was closed in February 2009 after examination found it to be in unsafe condition. Deconstruction began in 2015 and the replacement segmental concrete box girder bridge was dedicated to veterans and opened on November 11, 2015.

In the early 1970s, construction of the Liberty-bypass bridges began. Construction of the bridges over the Flint River was completed much before the highway itself. They became known as the bridges to nowhere.

=== Energy infrastructure ===
==== Georgia Power ====
Portions of Albany are serviced by Georgia Power, which operates two electrical power plants within Dougherty County: coal-fired Plant Mitchell and the hydroelectric dam at Lake Worth, also known as Lake Chehaw.

=== Water management infrastructure ===
The Albany Water, Gas & Light Commission (WG&L) is a municipally-owned and operated utility system furnishing water, gas, and electricity to its broad–based customers. Albany WG&L, was founded in 1892 as the Albany Water Works, as the largest municipal user in Georgia.

The public water supply source for Albany-Dougherty County is groundwater obtained from four aquifers:

- Upper Floridan (locally called the Ocala) Aquifer
- Claiborne (formerly Tallahatta) Aquifer
- Clayton Formation
- Providence Aquifer

The water quality is considered to be excellent, needing only chlorination and fluoridation treatment.

=== Communications infrastructure ===
Both WG&L and AT&T offer communications infrastructure within the City of Albany.

=== Solid waste management ===
Albany is served by the Dougherty County Landfill located at 900 Gaissert Road, approximately 7.5 miles (12.1 km) southeast of the City of Albany.

=== Health care ===
Albany is the home of a not-for-profit regional health system with a 26-county cachement area with Phoebe Putney Memorial Hospital at its hub.

=== Public safety ===
==== Law enforcement ====
Albany is serviced by the Albany Police Department (APD) which is divided into three districts, each having its own police center. The Dougherty County Police Department is responsible for the unincorporated area of Dougherty County. The Dougherty County Sheriff's Department is a law enforcement agency under the direction of the County Sheriff, an elected official.

==== Fire protection ====
The Albany Fire Department consists of more than 150 assigned personnel operating 11 fire stations in Dougherty County, seven of which are within the city limits.

==== EMS/EMT service ====
Dougherty County EMS has over 60 employees and services the county through one headquarters and five satellite stations.

== Notable people ==
- Sanford Bishop: U.S. representative, former Georgia senator and Georgia representative
- Ray Charles: Grammy Award–winning singer, songwriter, pianist, and composer
- Alice Coachman: first black woman to win an Olympic gold medal
- Mary Francis Hill Coley: midwife in Albany 1930–1966, inducted into Georgia Women of Achievement 2011
- Paula Deen: TV personality and cooking show host
- Field Mob: hip hop group
- McCree Harris: activist with the Albany Movement
- Reginald D. Hunter: stand-up comedian
- Harry James: Swing era trumpet player and bandleader
- Alex Kendrick, actor/director/producer/filmmaker, co-founder of Sherwood Pictures and Kendrick Brothers
- Stephen Kendrick, actor/director/producer/filmmaker, co-founder of Sherwood Pictures and Kendrick Brothers
- Ray Knight: former Major League Baseball infielder best remembered for his time with the 1986 World Series Champion New York Mets
- Kylie Sonique Love: drag queen, winner of season six of RuPaul's Drag Race All Stars
- Paul McKinney: Pennsylvania State Senator for the 8th district from 1975 to 1982
- Bart Oates: Five-time NFL pro-bowler and three-time Super Bowl Champion
- Jo Marie Payton, actress
- Phillip Phillips: singer-songwriter and actor who won the 11th season of American Idol
- Bernice Johnson Reagon: American song leader, professor of American history, composer, historian, musician, scholar, curator at the Smithsonian, and social activist
- Bobby Rush: pastor and U.S. Representative from Illinois
- Edward Skeletrix, musician and creative director
- Daryl Smith: Former linebacker for the Jacksonville Jaguars, Baltimore Ravens, and Tampa Bay Buccaneers of the National Football League
- Harry Spilman: former player for the Houston Astros and San Francisco Giants
- Angelo Taylor: athlete, Olympic gold medalist
- Geraldine W. Travis: first black woman to serve in the Montana House of Representatives
- James Wheeler (1937–2014), Chicago blues guitarist, singer and songwriter
- Joe Yonan, journalist, cookbook author and the food and dining editor for The Washington Post
- Deion Branch, former wide receiver for Louisville, then professionally for the Patriots
