= WMOG =

WMOG may refer to:

- WMOG (AM), a radio station (910 AM) licensed to serve Meridian, Mississippi, United States
- WSSI, a radio station (92.7 FM) licensed to serve St. Simons Island, Georgia, United States, which held the call sign WMOG-FM from 1991 to 1995 and WMOG from 2014 to 2016
- WBGA, a radio station (1490 AM) licensed to serve Brunswick, Georgia, which held the call sign WMOG from 1939 to 2014
