= Brunswick, Georgia =

City in the United States

- City
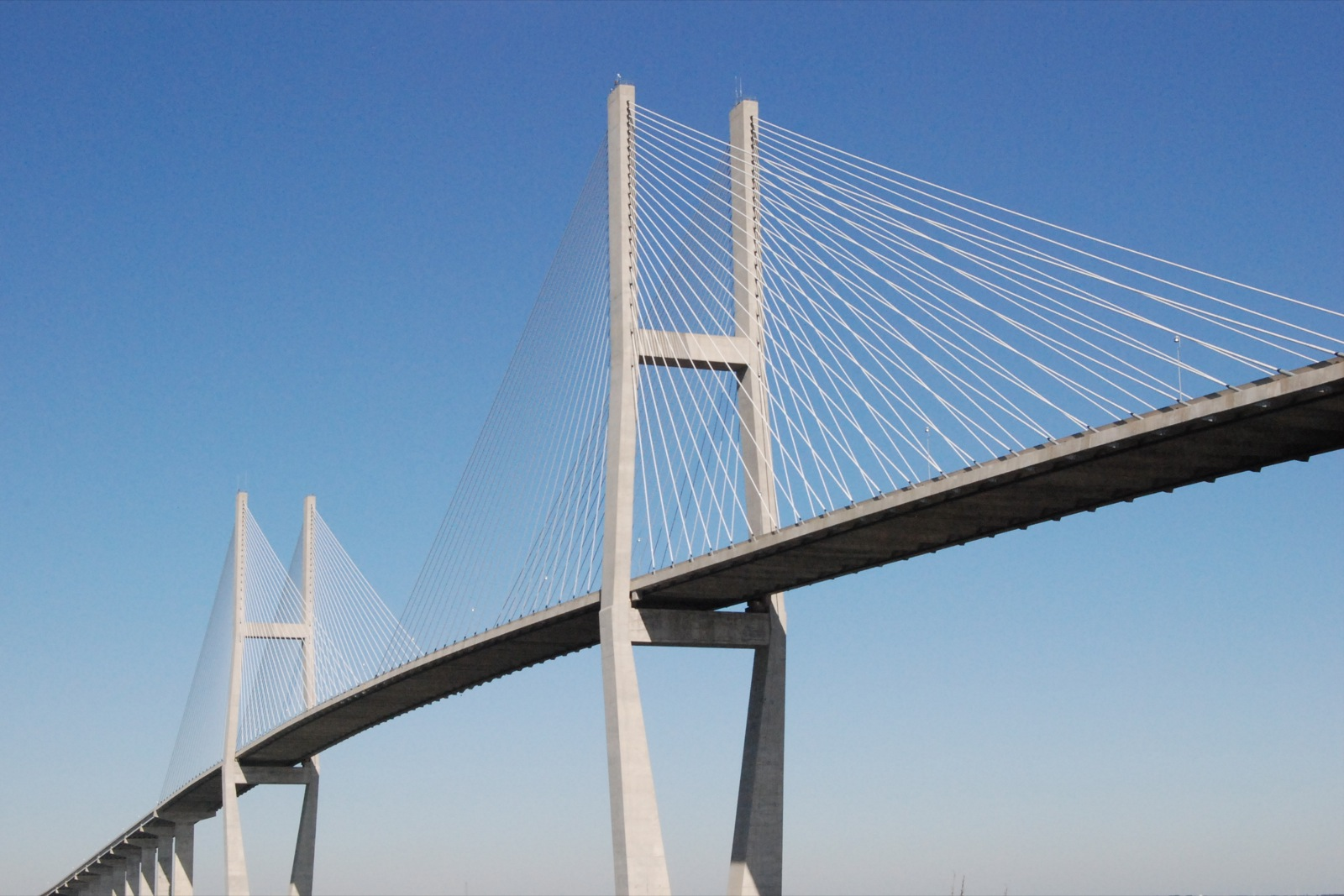
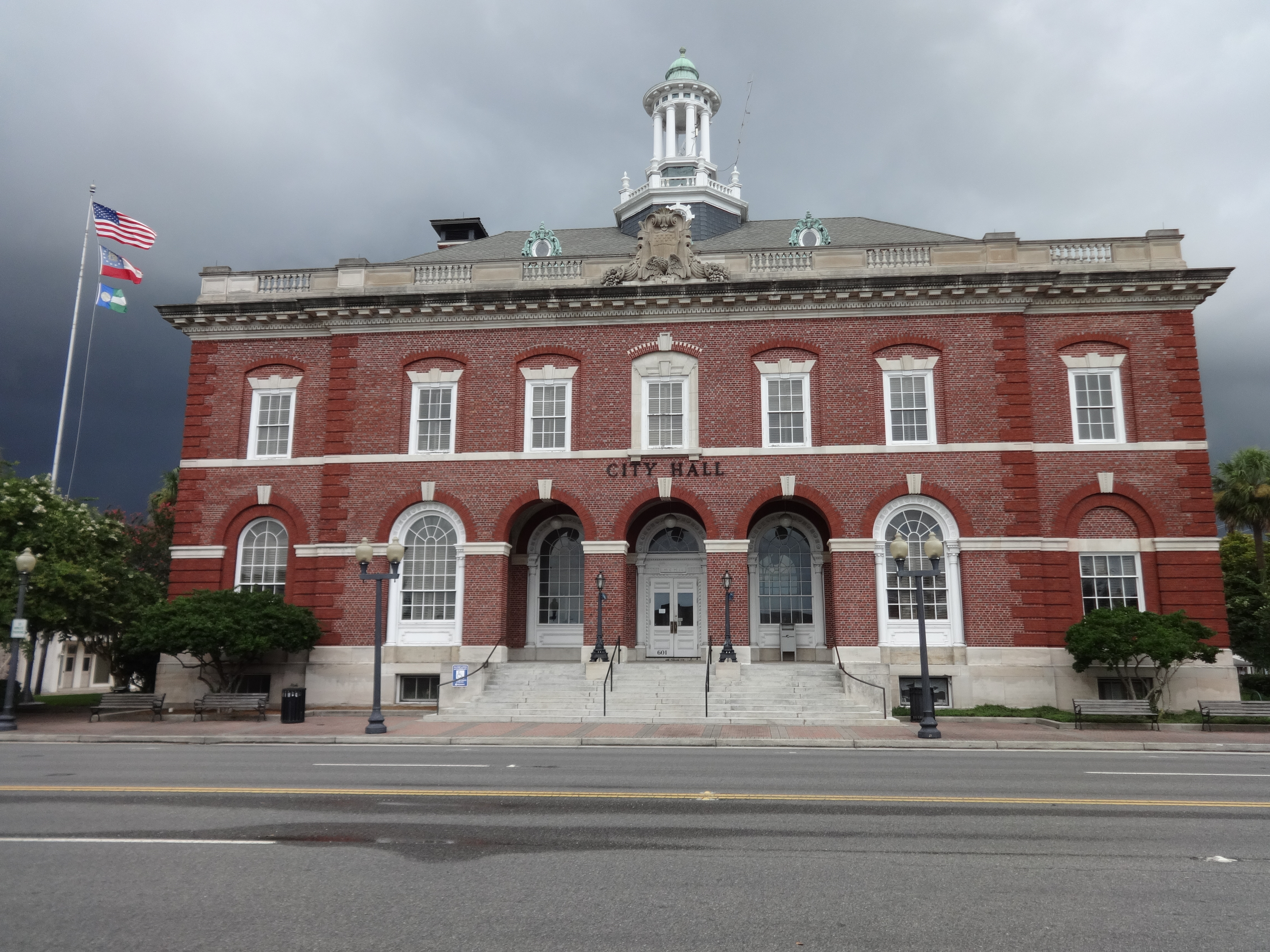
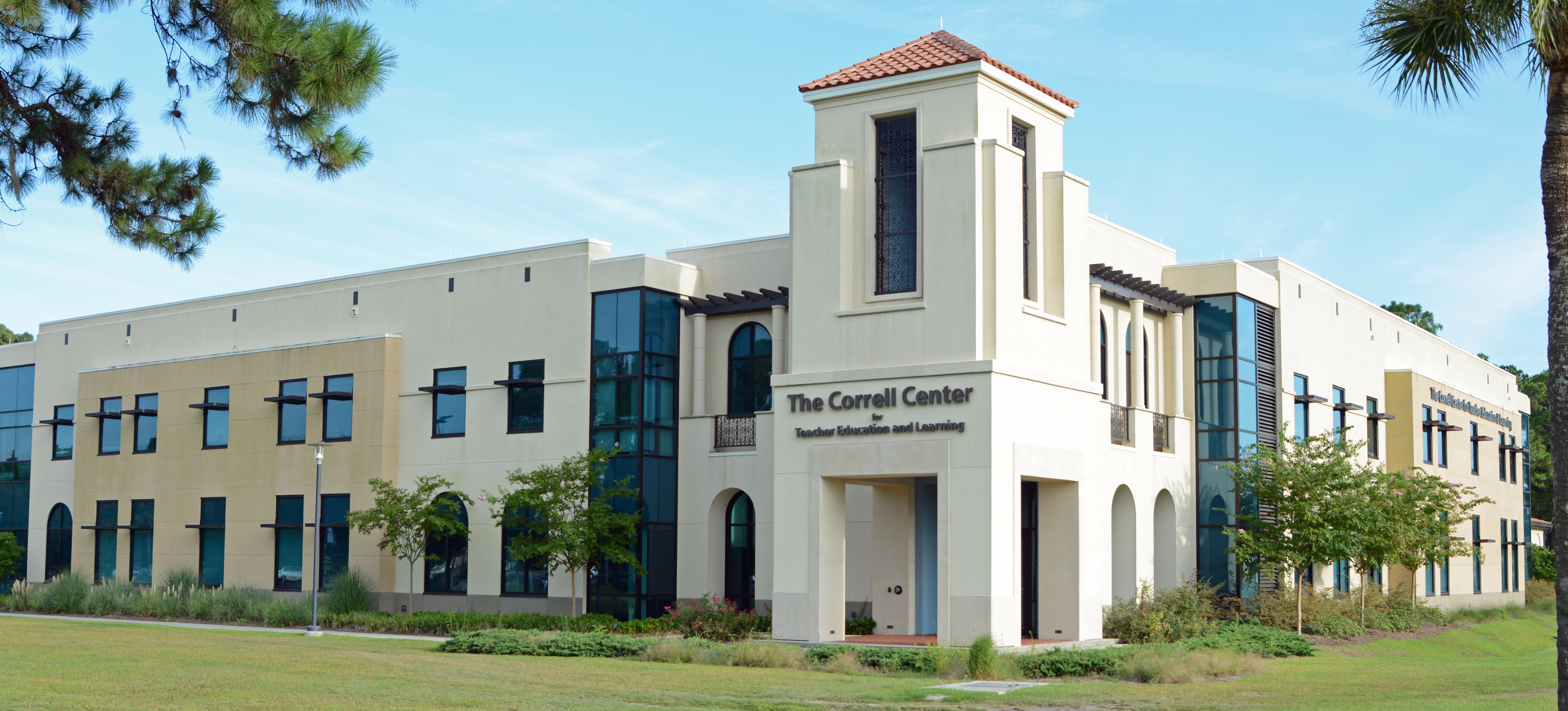
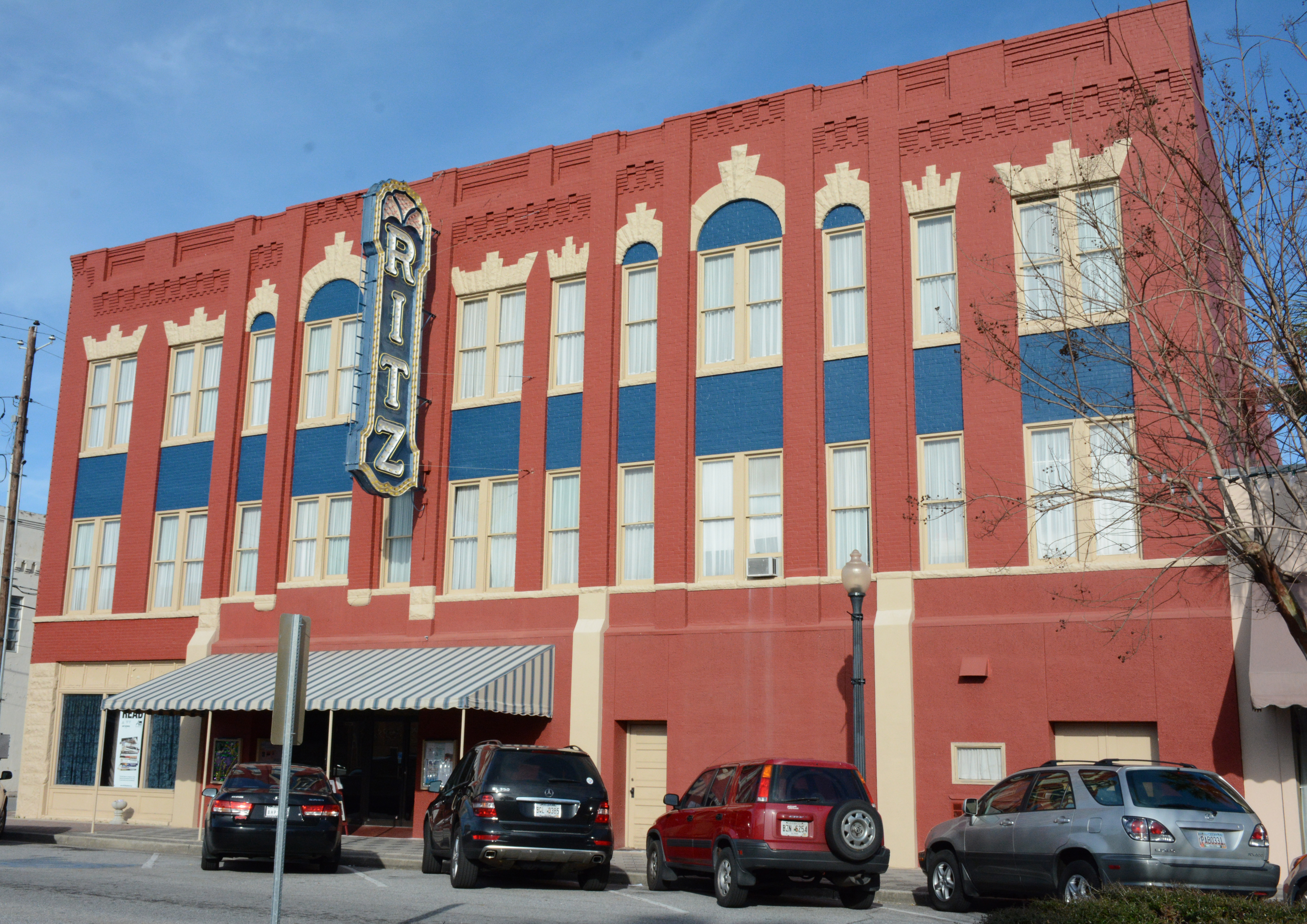
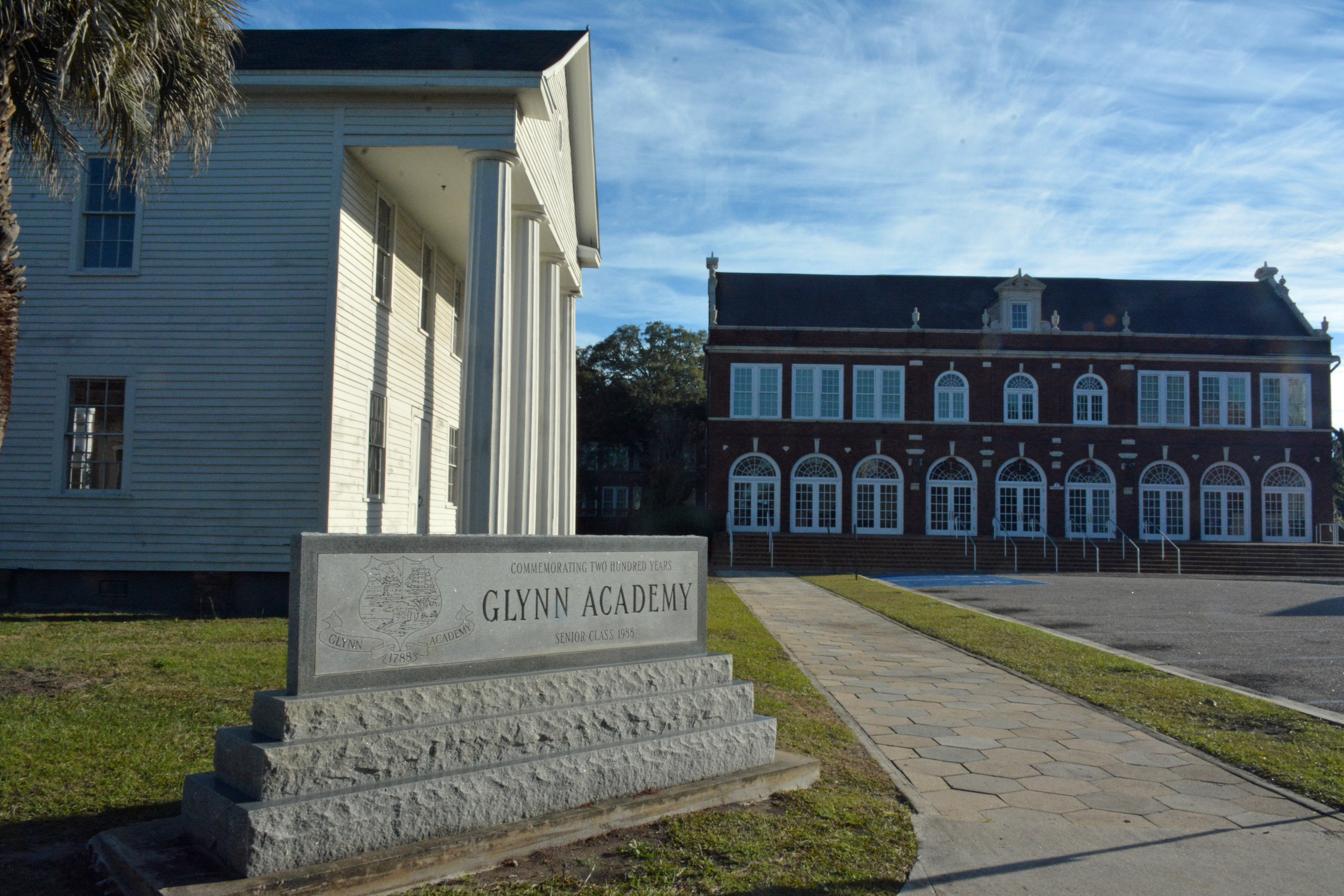
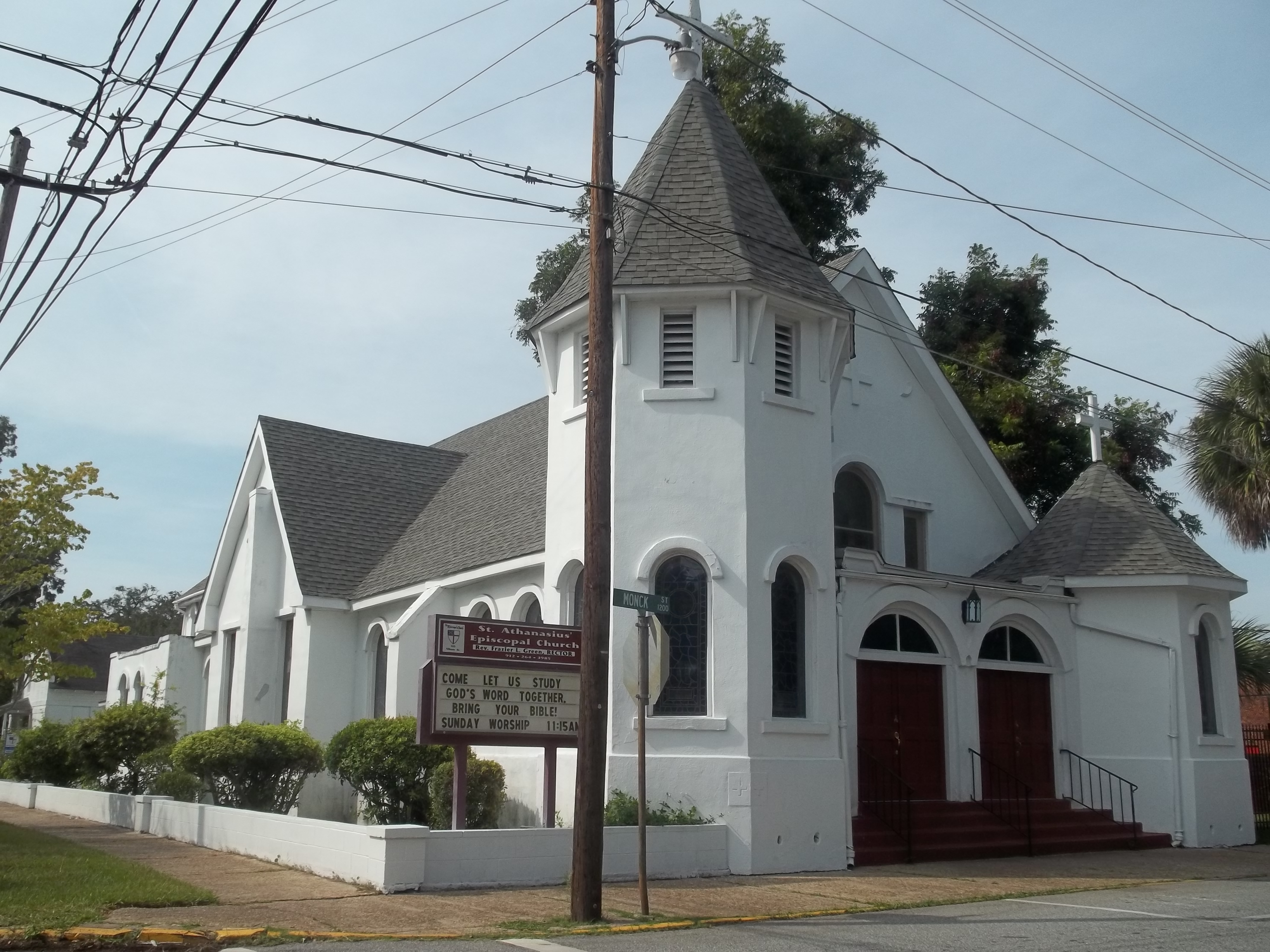
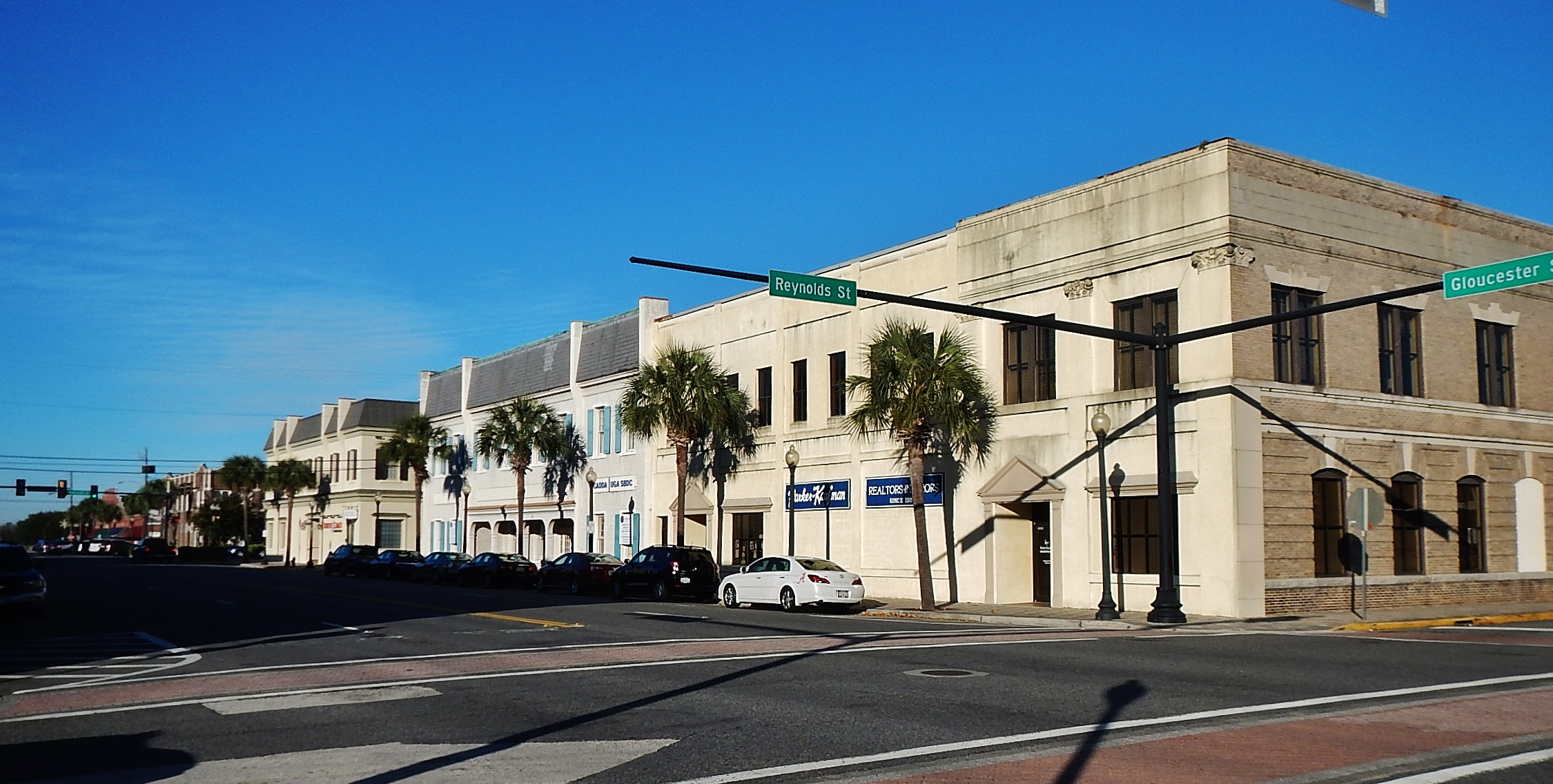
- From top, left to right: Sidney Lanier Bridge, Old Brunswick City Hall, College of Coastal Georgia, Ritz Theatre, Glynn Academy, St. Athanasius Episcopal Church, Downtown

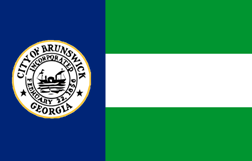
- Flag Seal
- Nicknames: "Port City" "Shrimp Capital of the World"
- Location in Glynn County and the state of Georgia
- Coordinates: 31°8′59″N 81°29′29″W
- Country: United States
- State: Georgia
- County: Glynn
- Settled: 1738
- Founded: 1771
- Incorporated: 1856

Government
  - Type: Council-Manager
  - Mayor: Cosby H. Johnson
  - Mayor pro tem: Felicia Harris
  - Commission: Gwen Atkinson-Williams; Kendra Rolle, Lance Sabbe
  - Manager: Regina M. McDuffie

Area
  - City: 25.09 sq mi (64.99 km^{2})
  - Land: 17.02 sq mi (44.08 km^{2})
  - Water: 8.07 sq mi (20.91 km^{2})
  - Metro: 1,286 sq mi (3,332 km^{2})
  - CCD: 42.4 sq mi (109.8 km^{2})
- Elevation: 14 ft (4.3 m)

Population (2020)
  - City: 15,210
  - Density: 893.7/sq mi (345.06/km^{2})
  - Metro: 112,370
  - Metro density: 87/sq mi (33.7/km^{2})
  - CCD: 33,555
  - CCD density: 1,037/sq mi (400.3/km^{2})
- Demonym: Brunswickian
- Time zone: UTC−5 (EST)
  - Summer (DST): UTC−4 (EDT)
- ZIP codes: 31520-31525, 31527, 31561
- Area code: 912
- FIPS code: 13-11560
- GNIS feature ID: 0354878
- Website: brunswickga.org

Brunswick (/ˈbrʌnzwɪk/ BRUN-zwik) is a city in and the county seat of Glynn County in the U.S. state of Georgia. As the primary urban and economic center of the lower southeast portion of Georgia, it is the second-largest urban area on the Georgia coastline after Savannah and contains the Brunswick Old Town Historic District. At the 2020 U.S. census, the population of the city proper was 15,210; the Brunswick metropolitan area's population as of 2020 was 113,495.

Established as "Brunswick" after the German Duchy of Brunswick–Lüneburg, the ancestral home of the House of Hanover, the municipal community was incorporated as a city in 1856. Throughout its history, Brunswick has served as an important port city; in World War II, for example, it served as a strategic military location with an operational base for escort blimps and a shipbuilding facility for the U.S. Maritime Commission. Since then, its port has served numerous economic purposes.

Brunswick supports a progressive economy largely based on tourism and logistics, with a metropolitan GDP of $3.9 billion as of 2013. The Port of Brunswick, one of Georgia's two seaports, handles approximately 10 percent of all U.S. roll-on/roll-off trade—third in the U.S., behind the ports of Los Angeles and Newark. The headquarters of the Federal Law Enforcement Training Center is located 5 miles (8 km) north of the central business district of the city and is adjacent to Brunswick Golden Isles Airport, which provides commercial air service to the area. Brunswick is also home to the College of Coastal Georgia, enrolling over 3,000 students.

Brunswick is located on a harbor of the Atlantic Ocean, approximately 40 mi (60 km) north of Florida and 80 mi (130 km) south of South Carolina. Brunswick is bordered on the west by Oglethorpe Bay, the East River, and the Turtle River. It is bordered on the south by the Brunswick River and on the east by the Atlantic Intracoastal Waterway in the Mackay River, which separates it from the Golden Isles.

== History ==
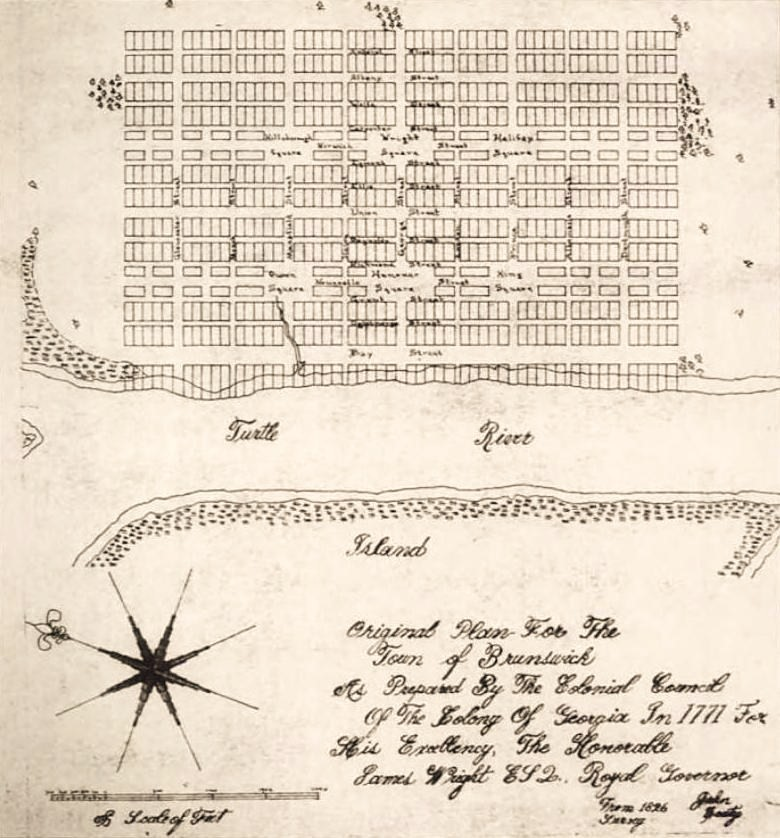
Original town plan (1771)

The Mocama, a Timucua-speaking people, lived in and cultivated the lands in what is now Brunswick. The Spanish established missions in Timucuan villages beginning in 1568. During this time, much of the Native American population was depleted through enslavement and disease. When the Province of Carolina was founded in 1663, the British claimed all lands south to the 31st parallel north, but little colonization occurred south of the Altamaha River as the Spanish also claimed this land. Three years after the Province of Georgia was founded at Savannah in 1733, James Oglethorpe had the town of Frederica built on St. Simons Island, challenging Spaniards who laid claim to the island. The Spanish were driven out of the province after British victories in the battles of Bloody Marsh and Gully Hole Creek in 1742; it was not until the Treaty of Paris of 1763 that Spain's threat to the province was formally ended, when all lands north of the St. Marys River and south of the Savannah River were designated as Georgia.

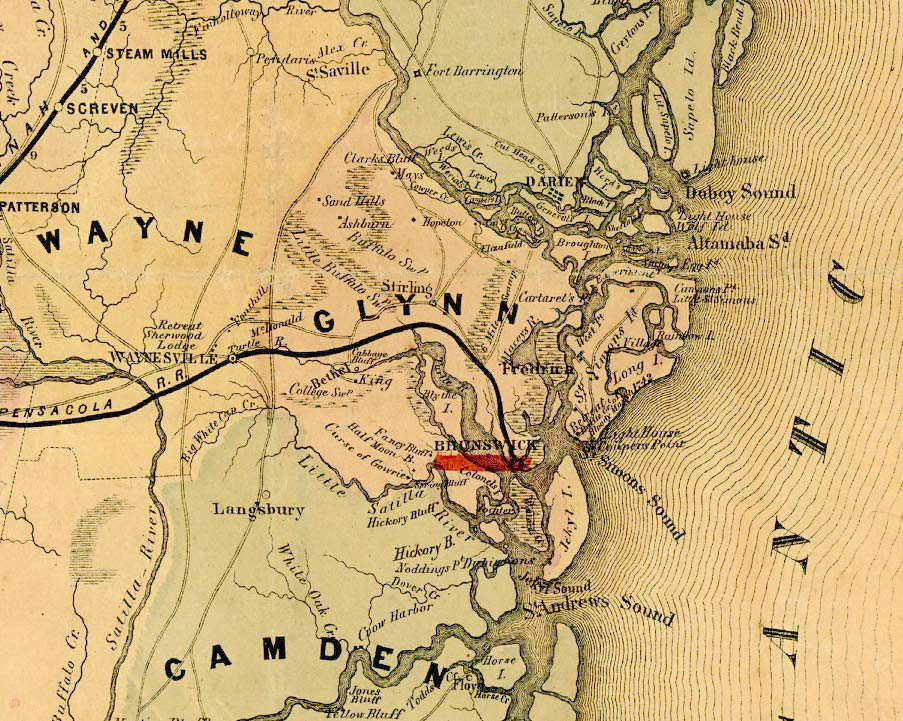
An 1864 map of Brunswick and the surrounding area

The area's first European settler, Mark Carr, arrived in 1738. Carr, a Scotsman, was a captain in Oglethorpe's Marine Boat Company. Upon landing, he established his 1,000-acre (400 ha) tobacco plantation, which he called "Plug Point", along the East and Brunswick rivers. The Province of Georgia purchased Carr's fields in 1771 and laid out the town of Brunswick in the grid plan akin to that of Savannah, with large, public squares at given intervals. The town was named for the duchy of Brunswick-Lüneburg in Germany, the ancestral home of George III and the House of Hanover. Brunswick was a rectangular tract of land consisting of 383.5 acres (155.2 ha). The first lot was granted on June 30, 1772; 179 lots were granted in the first three years. However, at about this time Brunswick lost most of its citizens, many of whom were Loyalists, to East Florida, the Caribbean Basin, and the United Kingdom for protection during the American Revolutionary War. From 1783 to 1788 a number of these lots were regranted and there collected in Brunswick a few families who desired proper education for their children. By the act of the General Assembly on February 1, 1788, eight town commissioners were appointed and Glynn Academy was chartered, the funding of which was to come from the sales of town lots. Brunswick was recognized as an official port of entry in 1789 by an act of the United States Congress. In 1797 the General Assembly transferred the seat of Glynn County from Frederica to Brunswick. (Note: On March 25, 1765, Georgia's colonial assembly divided the territory south of the Altamaha River into four new parishes. Two of these parishes—St. David and St. Patrick—would later be combined to form the mainland portion of Glynn County. Additionally, the 1765 act assigned Jekyll Island to St. James Parish, meaning that this parish consisted entirely of St. Simons and Jekyll islands. On February 5, 1777, the state's first constitution was adopted. Article IV of that document transformed the existing colonial parishes into seven counties, with Native American-ceded lands to the north forming an eighth county. Glynn County, which was seventh on the list and thus is considered Georgia's seventh county, consisted of all of St. David and St. Patrick parishes. In 1789 the legislature added St. Simons and Jekyll islands to Glynn County. Frederica on St. Simons Island served as Glynn County's seat beginning in 1789, at the absorption of the islands into Glynn. In an act of February 10, 1787, Georgia's legislature provided that Glynn County's courthouse and jail be erected and that county elections be held in Brunswick—which made it the county seat. Ten years later—on February 13, 1797—the legislature formally designated Brunswick the seat of Glynn County. (See Glynn County Courthouse at the Digital Library of Georgia.))

At the end of the eighteenth century, a large tract of land surrounding Brunswick on three sides had been laid off and designated as Commons. Commissioners were named in 1796 to support these efforts. The General Assembly authorized them to sell 500 acres (200 ha) of Commons, one-half of the proceeds to go to the construction of the courthouse and jail and one-half to the support of the academy. In 1819 the commissioners erected a suitable building for school purposes on the southeastern corner of Reynolds and L streets. This was the first public building in Brunswick. It was abandoned four years later, but a new building was erected on Hillsborough Square in 1840 using Commons proceeds. A courthouse and jail were built around this time.

The town was officially incorporated as a city on February 22, 1856. It was at this time that state representative Jacob Moore in conjunction with others conspired to control the Commons, and any proceeds that might be had from sales. Moore managed to persuade the Georgia General Assembly to pass legislation giving him control over significant amounts of local real estate. This precipitated a period of strife, pitting the powerful interests, headed by Rep. Moore, against the common citizenry. It was into this turmoil that Carey Wentworth Styles appeared, in 1857, when he moved his family to Brunswick from Edgefield, South Carolina. Styles, an attorney, was attracted to the area by news of the civil strife. As one observer later wrote, the citizens of Brunswick were in "need of a defender".

Styles quickly became embroiled in the dispute, siding with the citizenry. He announced his intention to run for mayor, and organized a mass protest rally for the evening of December 24. In spite of bad weather, a crowd gathered at the protest point, where Styles delivered an impassioned speech against the powerful interests, and the legislative act giving them the power to seize local property. Styles called the legislation "dishonorable", at which point Moore (the bill's sponsor and beneficiary) jumped to his feet and shouted at Styles, calling the accusation a "falsehood". In the official testimony on file in the Glynn County courthouse, Styles is said to have yelled back at Moore, saying "You are a damned liar!", to which Moore replied "You are a damneder liar!". Gunfire ensued, resulting in the death of Moore. Witness accounts had Moore firing first, and though Styles was subsequently arrested for manslaughter, the charges were eventually dropped. On March 1, 1858, Styles was elected mayor of Brunswick. Some years later, Styles moved to Atlanta, where he founded The Atlanta Constitution. In November 1879, nineteen years after he left, Styles returned to Brunswick, where he established the local weekly Seaport Appeal. When that eventually failed, Styles moved to Texas, never to see Brunswick again.

By 1860 Brunswick had a population of 468, a bank, a weekly newspaper, and a sawmill which employed nine workers.

Brunswick was abandoned during the American Civil War when citizens were ordered to evacuate. The city, like many others in the South, suffered from post-war depression. After one of the nation's largest lumber mills began operation on nearby St. Simons Island, economic prosperity returned. Rail lines were constructed from Brunswick to inland Georgia, which stimulated a sawmill boom, said to average one mill every two miles, along with the new industrial corridor. In his book The New South Comes to Wiregrass Georgia, 1860–1910 author Mark V. Wetherington states that from Eastman, former Quartermaster General Ira R. Foster "shipped lumber to Brunswick, where it was loaded onto timber schooners and transported to international markets like Liverpool, Rio de Janeiro, and Havana." Unlike many other southern cities during the Reconstruction period, Brunswick experienced an economic boom.

In 1878, poet and native Georgian Sidney Lanier, who sought relief from tuberculosis in Brunswick's climate, wrote "The Marshes of Glynn", a poem based on the salt marshes that span Glynn County. The December 1888 issue of Harper's Weekly predicted that "Brunswick by the Sea" was destined to become the "winter Newport of America". Jekyll Island had become a resort destination for some of the era's most influential families (most notably Rockefellers, Vanderbilts, Pulitzers, and Goodyears) who arrived by train or yacht.

A yellow fever epidemic began in 1893, which heralded a decade of hardships for the city; it was flooded in 1893 when a modern-day Category 3 hurricane (today known as the Sea Islands Hurricane) paralleled the coast of Georgia before hitting South Carolina. The storm left the city under 6 feet (1.8 m) of water. A Category 4 hurricane hit Cumberland Island just south of Brunswick in October 1898, which caused a 16-foot (4.9 m) storm surge in the city. As a result, 179 were killed.

Construction of an electric streetcar line began in 1909 and was completed in 1911. Tracks were located in the center of several city streets. In July 1924, the F.J. Torras Causeway, the roadway between Brunswick and St. Simons Island, was completed, and passenger boat service from Brunswick to St. Simons Island was terminated. By 1926, the electric streetcar line in Brunswick was discontinued; the decline of the streetcar systems coincided with the rise of the automobile.

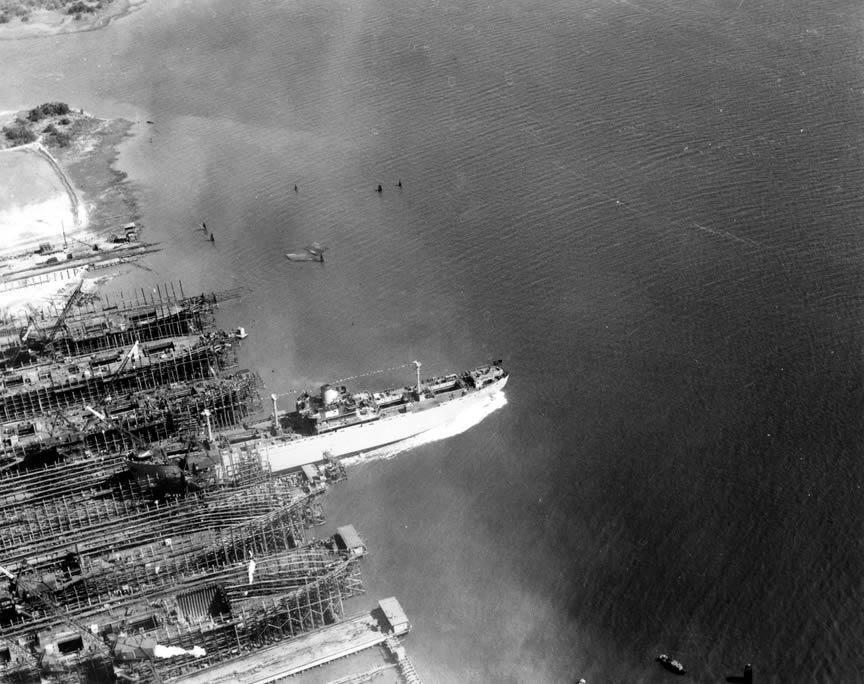
A Liberty Ship is launched from Brunswick.

In World War II, Brunswick served as a strategic military location. German U-boats threatened the coast of the southern United States, and blimps became a common sight as they patrolled the coastal areas. During the war, blimps from Brunswick's Naval Air Station Glynco (at the time, the largest blimp base in the world) safely escorted almost 100,000 ships without a single vessel lost to enemy submarines.

In World War II, Brunswick boomed as over 16,000 workers of the J.A. Jones Construction Company produced ninety-nine Liberty ships and "Knot" ships (type C1-M ships) which were designed for short coastal runs, and most often named for knots for the U.S. Maritime Commission to transport materiel to the European and Pacific theatres.

The first ship was the SS James M. Wayne (named after James Moore Wayne), whose keel was laid on July 6, 1942, and which was launched on March 13, 1943. The last ship was the SS Coastal Ranger, whose keel was laid on June 7, 1945, and which was launched on August 25, 1945. The first six ships took 305 to 331 days each to complete, but soon production ramped up and most of the remaining ships were built in about two months, bringing the average down to 89 days each. By November 1943, about four ships were launched per month. The SS William F. Jerman was completed in only 34 days in November and December 1944. Six ships could be under construction in slipways at one time.

=== 1915 mass shooting ===
Brunswick massacre
- Location: Brunswick, Georgia, United States
- Date: March 16, 1915; 10:30 a.m.
- Attack type: Mass murder
- Weapon: 10-gauge Parker double-barreled shotgun
- Deaths: 8 (including the perpetrator)
- Injuries: 30+
- Perpetrator: Monroe Phillips

On March 16, 1915, a mass shooting occurred in downtown Brunswick at the Dunwoody Building at Gloucester and Newcastle Streets when 58-year-old timber and real-estate dealer Monroe Phillips opened fire with a shotgun at his creditor, Harry Dunwoody's office and on the streets of Brunswick, over a failed business deal. In the rampage he killed seven people, including a police officer, and injured over 30 others before being killed by police.

== Geography ==
Brunswick in relation to its closest urban areas within 500 miles (800 km) with a population greater than 1 million, as well as Savannah for reference

The city of Brunswick is located in southeastern Georgia, approximately halfway between Jacksonville, Florida and Savannah. The city is located at the apex of the Georgia Bight, the westernmost point on the Atlantic seaboard, and is naturally sheltered by two barrier islands, Jekyll and St. Simons. The city is situated on a peninsula with the East River and the Turtle River to the west, the Brunswick River to the south, and the Mackay River with the Intracoastal Waterway to the east. An abundance of salt marshes separates the city from the Intracoastal Waterway, which passes between Brunswick and the barrier islands. The East River separates Brunswick from Andrews Island, a dredge spoil site.

The city is the lowest in the U.S. state of Georgia, with an elevation of only 10 to 14 feet (3.0 to 4.3 m) above sea level. According to the U.S. Census Bureau, Brunswick's land area is 32.4 square miles (83.8 km^{2}). Its total area is 42.4 square miles (109.8 km^{2}); 10.0 square miles (26.0 km^{2}) of this is water.

=== Climate ===
Brunswick's climate is classified as humid subtropical (Cfa in the Köppen climate classification system). During the summer months, it is common for the temperature to reach over 90 °F (32 °C). However, the humidity results in a heat index higher than the actual temperature. Summer mornings average nearly 90 percent humidity and nearly 60 percent in the afternoon. Scattered afternoon thunderstorms are common in the summer. The hottest temperature ever recorded in Brunswick was 106 °F (41 °C) in 1986. Winters in Brunswick are fairly temperate. The average high in January, the coldest month, is 63 °F (17 °C), while the average low is 44 °F (7 °C). Snowfall is very rare. The last snow accumulation in Brunswick was on January 22, 2025. The coldest temperature ever recorded in Brunswick was 5 °F (−15 °C) on January 21, 1985, and January 30, 1966.

Brunswick receives a high amount of rainfall annually, averaging about 49.6 inches (1,260 mm). The wettest months are August and September, the peak of hurricane season. The city has suffered less damage from hurricanes than most other East Coast cities. A major hurricane has not made landfall on the Georgia coast since 1898, and the only hurricane that has hit the coast since then was Hurricane David in 1979. However, the city has experienced hurricane or near-hurricane conditions several times due to storms passing through Florida from the Gulf of Mexico and entering Georgia or passing to the north or south in the Atlantic and brushing the area.

Climate data for Brunswick, Georgia (1991−2020 normals, extremes 1895–present)
Month	Jan	Feb	Mar	Apr	May	Jun	Jul	Aug	Sep	Oct	Nov	Dec	Year
Record high °F (°C)	86 (30)	89 (32)	99 (37)	99 (37)	101 (38)	104 (40)	106 (41)	103 (39)	101 (38)	95 (35)	89 (32)	87 (31)	106 (41)
Mean maximum °F (°C)	77.7 (25.4)	80.3 (26.8)	84.7 (29.3)	88.7 (31.5)	93.9 (34.4)	97.1 (36.2)	98.9 (37.2)	97.6 (36.4)	93.8 (34.3)	88.4 (31.3)	83.0 (28.3)	78.6 (25.9)	99.5 (37.5)
Mean daily maximum °F (°C)	61.0 (16.1)	64.3 (17.9)	70.1 (21.2)	76.3 (24.6)	83.0 (28.3)	87.5 (30.8)	90.3 (32.4)	88.8 (31.6)	84.3 (29.1)	77.5 (25.3)	69.2 (20.7)	63.3 (17.4)	76.3 (24.6)
Daily mean °F (°C)	52.5 (11.4)	55.7 (13.2)	61.3 (16.3)	67.7 (19.8)	75.0 (23.9)	80.2 (26.8)	82.8 (28.2)	81.9 (27.7)	78.2 (25.7)	70.3 (21.3)	61.0 (16.1)	55.1 (12.8)	68.5 (20.3)
Mean daily minimum °F (°C)	44.0 (6.7)	47.0 (8.3)	52.6 (11.4)	59.2 (15.1)	67.1 (19.5)	72.9 (22.7)	75.3 (24.1)	75.1 (23.9)	72.0 (22.2)	63.1 (17.3)	52.9 (11.6)	46.9 (8.3)	60.7 (15.9)
Mean minimum °F (°C)	27.6 (−2.4)	30.9 (−0.6)	36.2 (2.3)	44.8 (7.1)	54.6 (12.6)	64.5 (18.1)	69.0 (20.6)	69.1 (20.6)	61.8 (16.6)	47.1 (8.4)	35.9 (2.2)	31.2 (−0.4)	25.0 (−3.9)
Record low °F (°C)	5 (−15)	13 (−11)	21 (−6)	34 (1)	35 (2)	51 (11)	58 (14)	61 (16)	45 (7)	36 (2)	21 (−6)	11 (−12)	5 (−15)
Average precipitation inches (mm)	3.54 (90)	3.06 (78)	3.80 (97)	3.07 (78)	3.04 (77)	6.35 (161)	4.94 (125)	6.95 (177)	6.26 (159)	4.60 (117)	2.03 (52)	2.65 (67)	50.29 (1,277)
Average precipitation days (≥ 0.01 in)	8.2	8.3	7.8	6.5	7.0	12.2	10.6	13.3	10.1	7.7	5.4	7.3	104.4
Source: NOAA

=== Environment ===
The Brunswick area has four Superfund sites, formerly home to heavily contaminated toxic waste sites: the LCP Chemicals site, Brunswick Wood Preserving, the Hercules 009 Landfill, and the Terry Creek Dredge Spoil Areas/Hercules Outfall. Research published in 2011 revealed that bottlenose dolphins that fed in the estuaries near these Superfund sites had the highest concentration of PCBs of any mammal in the world.

== Demographics ==
Historical population
Census	Pop.	Note	%±
1810	36		—
1860	825		—
1870	2,348		184.6%
1880	2,891		23.1%
1890	8,459		192.6%
1900	9,081		7.4%
1910	10,182		12.1%
1920	14,413		41.6%
1930	14,022		−2.7%
1940	15,035		7.2%
1950	17,954		19.4%
1960	21,703		20.9%
1970	19,585		−9.8%
1980	17,605		−10.1%
1990	16,433		−6.7%
2000	15,600		−5.1%
2010	15,383		−1.4%
2020	15,210		−1.1%
U.S. Decennial Census; 1850-1870 1870-1880; 1890-1910 1920-1930; 1940 1950 1960; 1970 1980 1990; 2000 2010

=== 2020 census ===
As of the 2020 census, Brunswick had a population of 15,210. The median age was 39.4 years. 25.0% of residents were under the age of 18 and 21.5% of residents were 65 years of age or older. For every 100 females there were 79.7 males, and for every 100 females age 18 and over there were 73.8 males age 18 and over.

99.9% of residents lived in urban areas, while 0.1% lived in rural areas.

There were 5,523 households in Brunswick, of which 33.9% had children under the age of 18 living in them. Of all households, 24.2% were married-couple households, 20.7% were households with a male householder and no spouse or partner present, and 47.6% were households with a female householder and no spouse or partner present. About 33.4% of all households were made up of individuals and 13.5% had someone living alone who was 65 years of age or older.

There were 6,546 housing units, of which 15.6% were vacant. The homeowner vacancy rate was 2.1% and the rental vacancy rate was 7.3%.

Brunswick racial and ethnic composition as of 2020
Race	Num.	Perc.
White (non-Hispanic)	4,622	30.39%
Black or African American (non-Hispanic)	8,548	56.2%
Native American	24	0.16%
Asian	55	0.36%
Pacific Islander	6	0.04%
Other/Mixed	511	3.36%
Hispanic or Latino	1,444	9.49%

=== 2010 census ===
At the 2010 census, there were 15,383 people living within the city.

=== 2000 census ===
At the 2000 census, the city had 15,600 people, 6,085 households, and 3,681 families, down from the city's initial historic high of 21,703 in 1960. There were 6,952 housing units at an average density of 403.8 per square mile (155.9/km^{2}).

In 2000, the city's racial and ethnic makeup was 59.8% Black or African American, 33.1% White (non-Hispanic whites), 0.3% American Indian or Alaska Native, 0.4% Asian, <0.1% Pacific Islander, 1.7% from other races, and 1.4% from two or more races. Hispanic or Latino Americans of any race were 5.8% of the population.

At the 2000 census, the median income for a household in the city was $22,272, and the median income for a family was $28,564. Males had a median income of $26,172 versus $18,602 for females. The per capita income for the city was $13,062. About 25.2% of families and 30.4% of the population were below the poverty line, including 43.9% of those under age 18 and 21.7% of those ages 65 or over.

=== 2008 ancestry estimates ===
Per 2008 estimates, the top five ancestry groups in the city were American (5.3%), English (5.1%), Subsarahan African (4.3%), Irish (4.1%), and German (3.6%). Approximately 54.1% of the population reported another ancestry.

=== 2015-2020 American Community Survey estimates ===
By 2020, the median household income was $27,471 with a mean of $57,395. Among families, the median income was $29,953 with a mean of $53,434; married-couple families had a median income of $63,301; and non-family households had a median income of $22,163 with a mean of $59,980.

The median monthly costs for occupied-housing units and renter-owned units was $718 in 2020; for homeowners with a mortgage, the median value of their single-family detached homes was $117,400 and the monthly costs were $1,068. The median real estate taxes paid among homeowners in the city was $951. Among the growing metropolitan statistical areas of Georgia, Brunswick has one of the lowest costs of living in contrast with Atlanta and its metropolitan region.

=== Religion ===
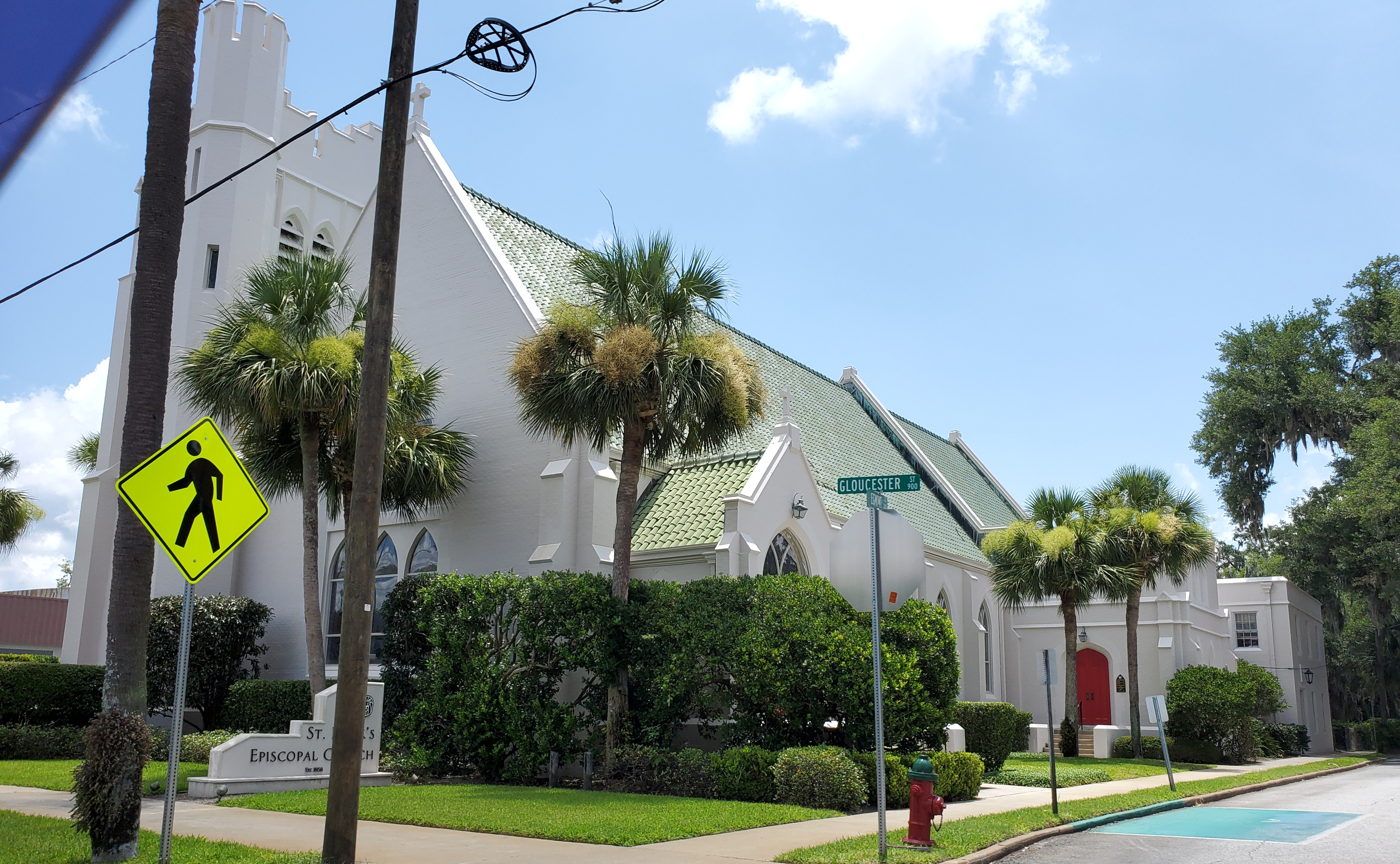
St. Mark's Episcopal Church

According to Sperling's BestPlaces, approximately 56.3% of the city's population identify with a religion as of 2020. Typical of those traditionally placed within the Bible Belt and conservative American South, the majority of the religiously affiliated population identified as Christians. The single largest Christian tradition within the city and metropolitan area are Baptists (15.7%). Among its Baptist constituency, the National Baptist Convention and Southern Baptist Convention were some of the largest Baptist denominations in the area. The largest single Christian denomination has been the Roman Catholic Church and its Diocese of Savannah (6.8%).

Following, Methodism was the second largest tradition (12.3%) and Pentecostalism was the third largest Christian tradition in the area (8.2%), notably served through the Assemblies of God and Church of God. Other prominent Christian communities operating with a substantial presence in the city and area have also been Presbyterians, Episcopalians or Anglicans of the Protestant Episcopal Church in the United States, Lutherans, etc. Among non-mainstream Christianity, the Church of Jesus Christ of Latter-Day Saints made up 1.5% of the faithful according to this study.

The second-largest religion practiced or adhered to in the area was Judaism, and collectively, Eastern religions such as Buddhism or Hinduism made up 0.3% of the population. The largest Jewish movement within the city has been Reform Judaism, spread throughout the historic Temple Beth Tefilloh, founded in 1886.

== Economy ==
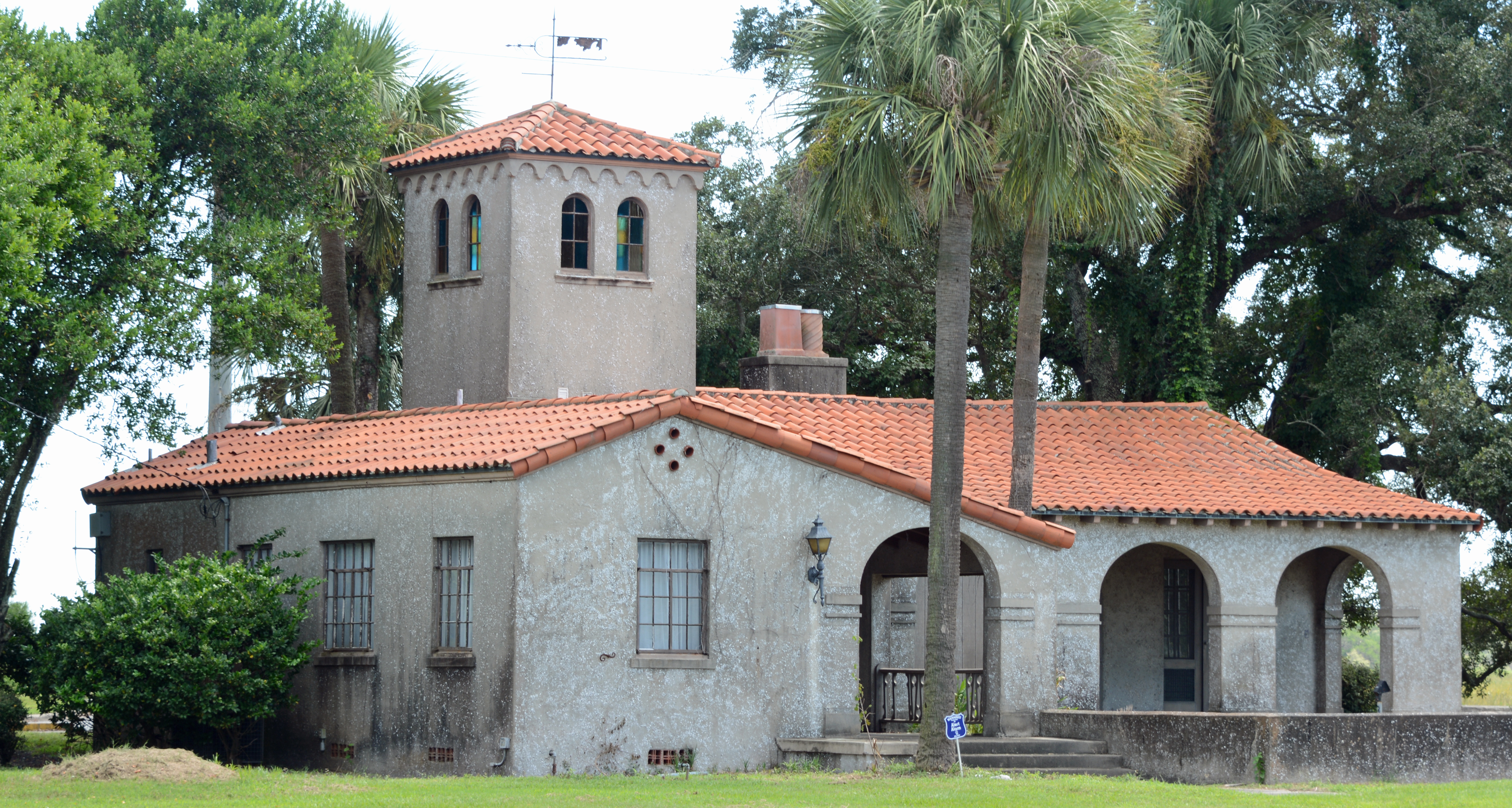
The building that was used as a welcome center

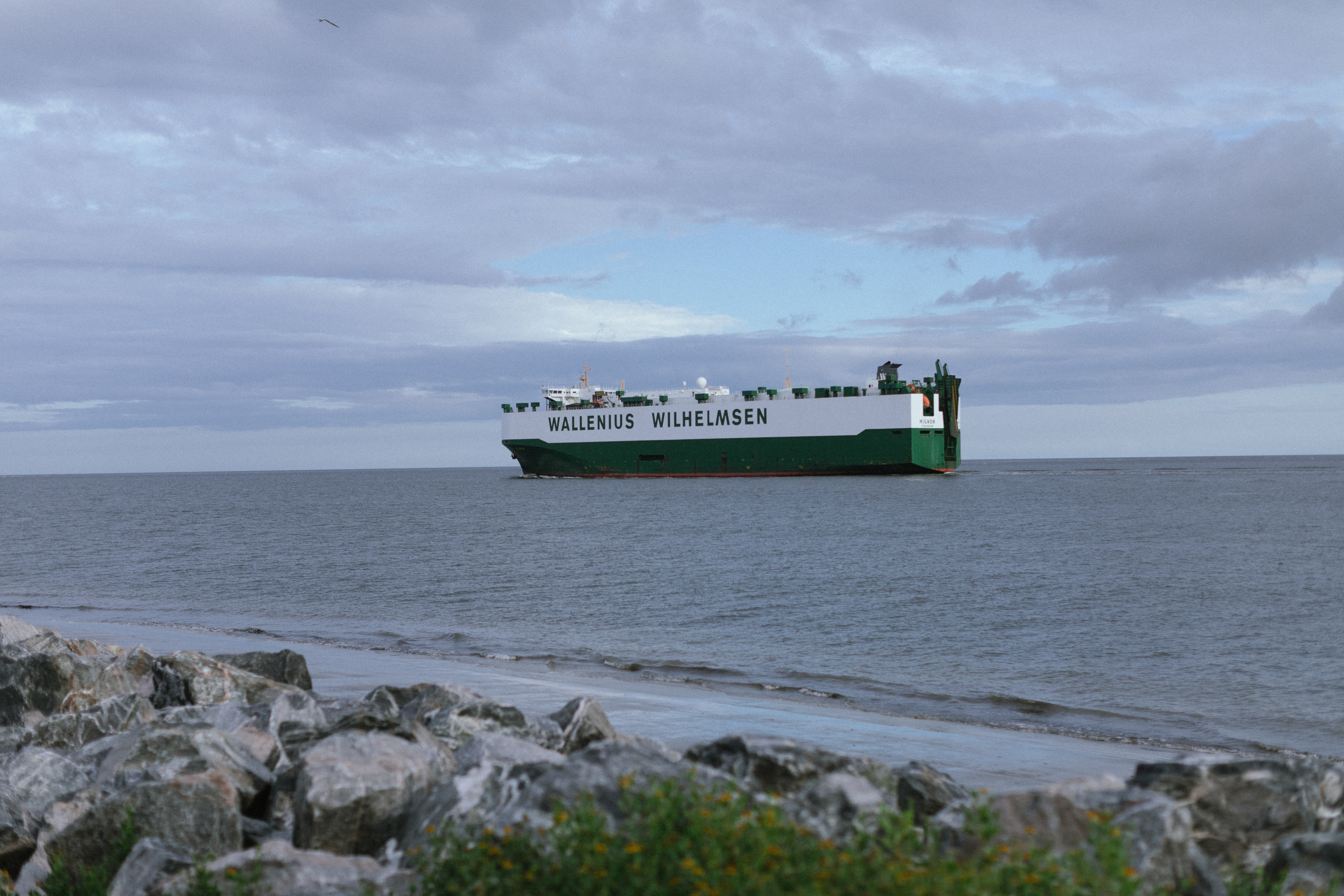
Ship off the coast of Brunswick

The Port of Brunswick forms a vital part of the city's economy. It is recognized as one of the most productive ports on the East Coast and is the sixth-busiest automobile port in the United States; it is the primary export facility for two of the three United States traditional automotive manufacturers: Ford and General Motors. The port is also the primary export facility for Mercedes-Benz. The port serves as the central import facility for Hyundai, Jaguar, Kia, Land Rover, Mitsubishi, Porsche, and Volvo. Audi, BMW, and Volkswagen utilize the port as a facility for imports as well. International Auto Processing is one of the town's largest employers. In addition to automobiles, exports include agricultural products and other bulk cargoes.

The port is operated by the Georgia Ports Authority and features four separate terminals: Colonel's Island RoRo, Colonel's Island Agri-bulk, Mayor's Point, and Marine Port. Mayor's Point is the only terminal located within the city. The Colonel's Island and Marine Port terminals are located southwest of the city.

The Federal Law Enforcement Training Center (FLETC), a large agency of the United States Department of Homeland Security, is headquartered in Glynco, north of the city. A study conducted by Georgia Tech identified FLETC as the largest employer in Glynn County; it was further determined that FLETC's annual localized economic impact is in excess of $600 million.

Southeast Georgia Health System is the largest private employer in Brunswick. Other major employers in Brunswick include King & Prince Seafood, GSI Commerce, Pinova and Gulfstream Aerospace. Wood pulp is produced by the Georgia-Pacific mill in Brunswick. The mill, which has been in operation since 1937, has the capability to produce over 800,000 metric tons of cellulose each year. Additionally, it is the largest single-site fluff production facility in the world. Hercules, a manufacturer, and marketer of chemical specialties operates a production facility on the north side of Brunswick. Jet aircraft manufacturer Gulfstream Aerospace has a presence at the city's airport.

Tourism is the single largest industry in the city and the county. Brunswick and the Golden Isles are a year-round resort community. The islands' beaches, resorts, shops, and historic sites annually attract visitors from around the world. President George W. Bush hosted the G8 summit in 2004 on Sea Island.

== Culture ==
=== Arts and theatre ===
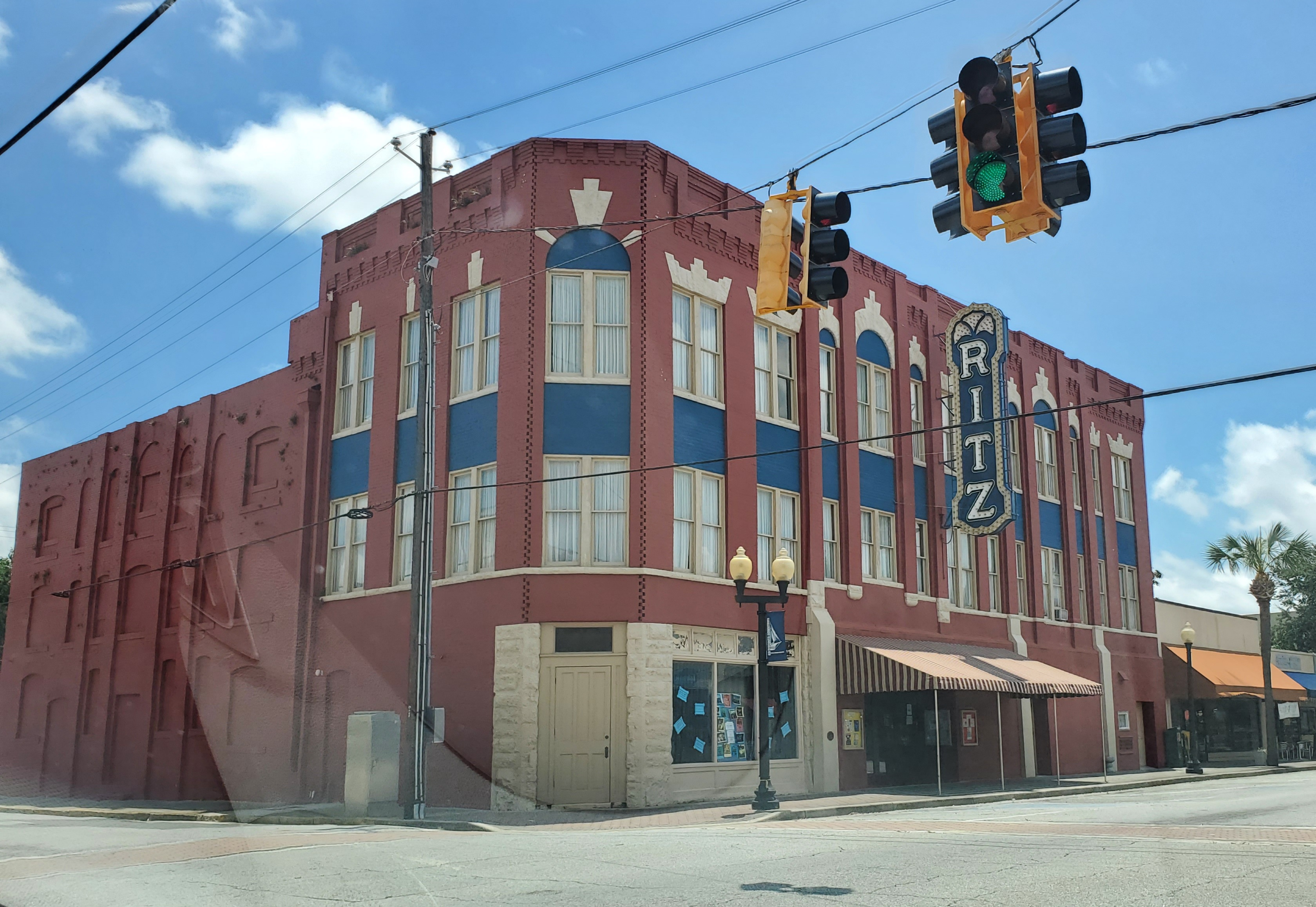
The Ritz Theatre

Brunswick is home to a variety of arts and cultural events. The most significant professional performing-arts group is the Coastal Symphony of Georgia, in existence since 1982, which stages productions each year at Glynn Academy's Memorial Auditorium. This group of professional musicians also has a Youth Symphony division and a fundraising auxiliary.

Old Town Brunswick's historic and ornate Ritz Theatre hosts a range of performances. Renovated in the early 1980s and again in 2000 through 2001, the Ritz is home to the Golden Isles Arts and Humanities Association, the coordinating arts council for Brunswick and Glynn County. The association hosts an annual performing arts series and rents space to individual producers and organizations.

The city is home to various art galleries. Art Downtown is a cultural arts center featuring a fine art gallery, studio, and production company. It is home to the Brunswick Actors' Theatre. The Gallery on Newcastle is home to a display of scenes from coastal Georgia's marshes.

Along Union Street is a collection of 19th and early 20th-century Victorian mansions. Each December the Magnolia Garden Club tours select Union Street homes in addition to other areas in historic Brunswick as part of its Christmas Tour of Homes.

=== Cuisine ===
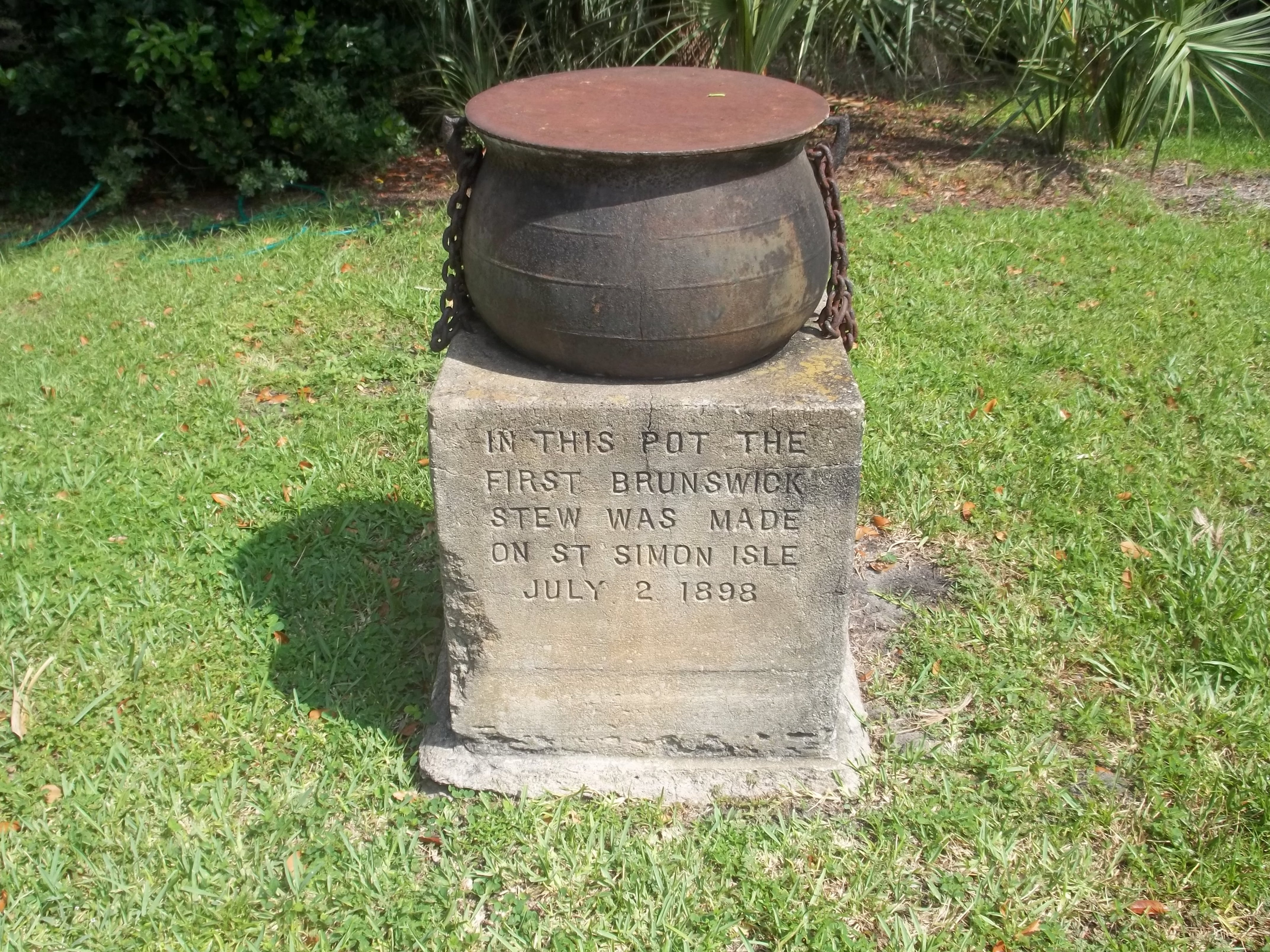
The city claims to be the place of origin of Brunswick stew.

The city lays claim to Brunswick stew, a tomato-based stew containing various types of lima beans, corn, okra, and other vegetables, and one or more types of meat. Most recipes claiming authenticity call for squirrel or rabbit meat, but chicken, pork, and beef are also common ingredients. A twenty-five-gallon (95 L) iron pot outside the city bears a plaque declaring the stew was first cooked there in 1898. The Brunswick Rockin' Stewbilee, held annually in October, features a stew-tasting contest where visitors sample over 50 teams' stews. The Stewbilee became famous when the city invited Brunswick County, Virginia, to the festival for a stew cookoff in the 1980s, which led the Brunswick "Stew Wars" to be featured in Southern Living.

Brunswick is the center of Georgia's shrimping industry. The city was once called "The Shrimp Capital of the World", but in recent times, production has been far below average. Nevertheless, nearby Jekyll Island hosts the Wild Georgia Shrimp & Grits Festival in September. Apart from shrimping, the area is also the center of Georgia's crab and oyster industries.

== Sports ==
The College of Coastal Georgia has an active collegiate sports program. The local high schools compete in the Georgia High School Association's quad-A Region 2 sporting events. From 1950 to 2007, Brunswick served host to the Golden Isles Bowl Classic, one of the most prestigious junior college football bowl games in the country. Scholastic and intramural sports are held at school and park facilities around the city. Glynn County Stadium and Lanier Field are two sports stadiums available in the city.

Golden Isles Speedway, a 5/8 mile (1.0 km) race track, is located in western Glynn County, approximately 20 miles (32 km) west of the city.

The PGA Tour holds the RSM Classic every year at the Seaside Course on Sea Island. The area is famous for its golf resorts. In 2008 Sea Island was ranked the number-one destination for business meetings and golf by Golf Digest and USA Today. Sea Island was also ranked number-one among the best golf resorts in North America by Golf Digest. There are three golf courses located just north of the city, and combined with Jekyll, St. Simons, and Sea islands, there are 252 holes of golf in the Brunswick area.

The Brunswick area is home to two out of three publicly accessible beaches in the state. Brunswick is the gateway city to Jekyll and St. Simons islands; both are accessible via automobile only by causeways from the city. The islands, known colloquially as the Golden Isles, feature white-sand public beaches and are popular destinations for tourists and local citizens.

In 1906 the city was home to a Class D-level minor league baseball team, the River Snipes, a team shared with Columbus as part of the inaugural season of the Georgia State League. The league went defunct following that season. In 1913 the Brunswick Pilots debuted as part of the short-lived Empire State League, before joining the Georgia State League in 1914, and the Florida–Alabama–Georgia League in 1915. The Pilots stopped play following the 1915 season. Thirty-six years passed before Brunswick had another professional baseball team. In 1951 the Brunswick Pirates, a Class D minor league affiliate of the major league Pittsburgh Pirates, began to play in the Georgia–Florida League, beginning eight years of presence in the city. The Pirates won league championships in 1954 and 1955. In 1957 the Pirates became affiliates of the Philadelphia Phillies, respectively adopting the name Brunswick Phillies. Following the 1958 season, the Phillies ceased to play. Brunswick was home to the Cardinals of the Georgia–Florida League in 1962 and 1963 before the league disbanded in 1963.

== Parks and recreation ==
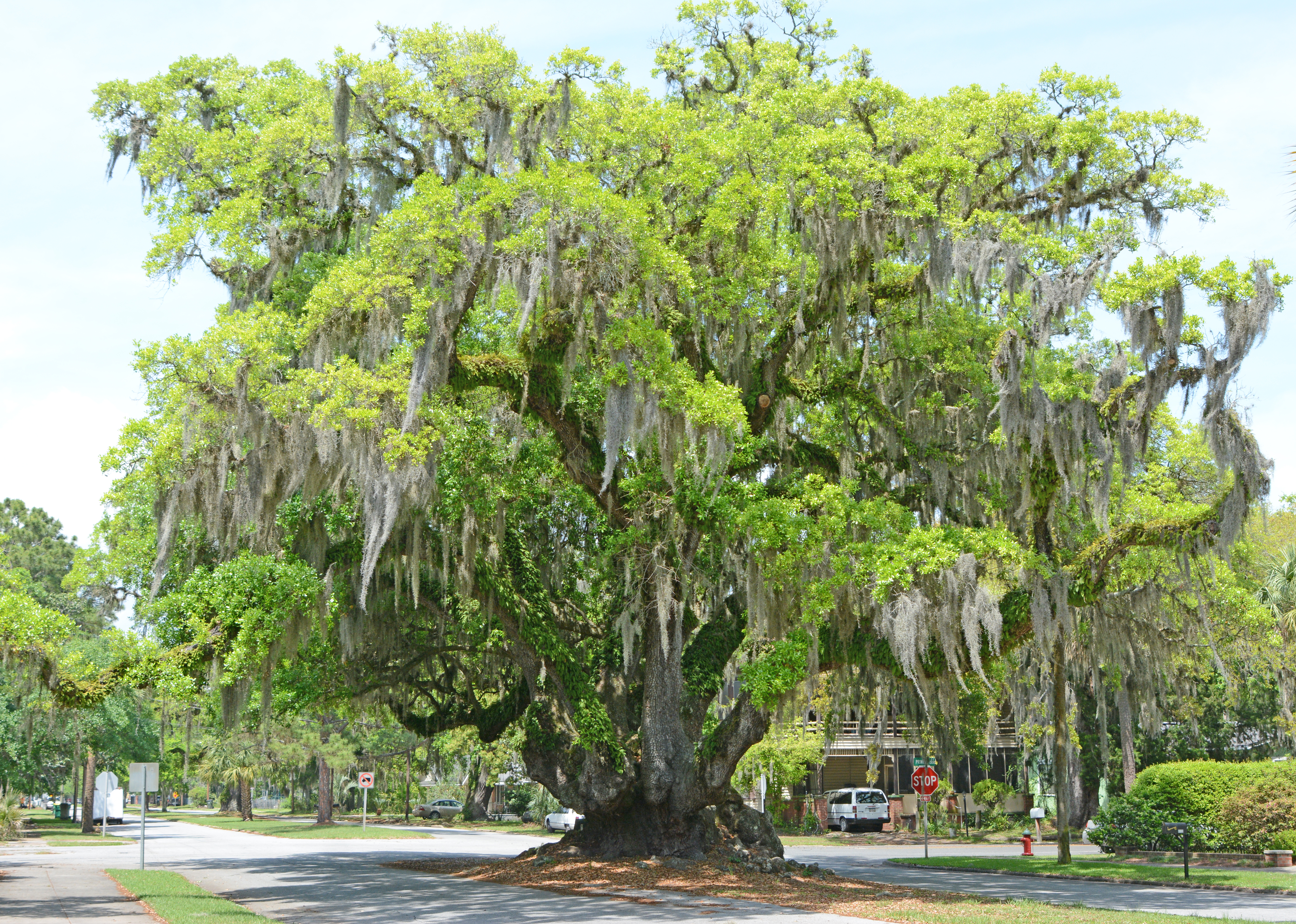
Lover's Oak in Old Town

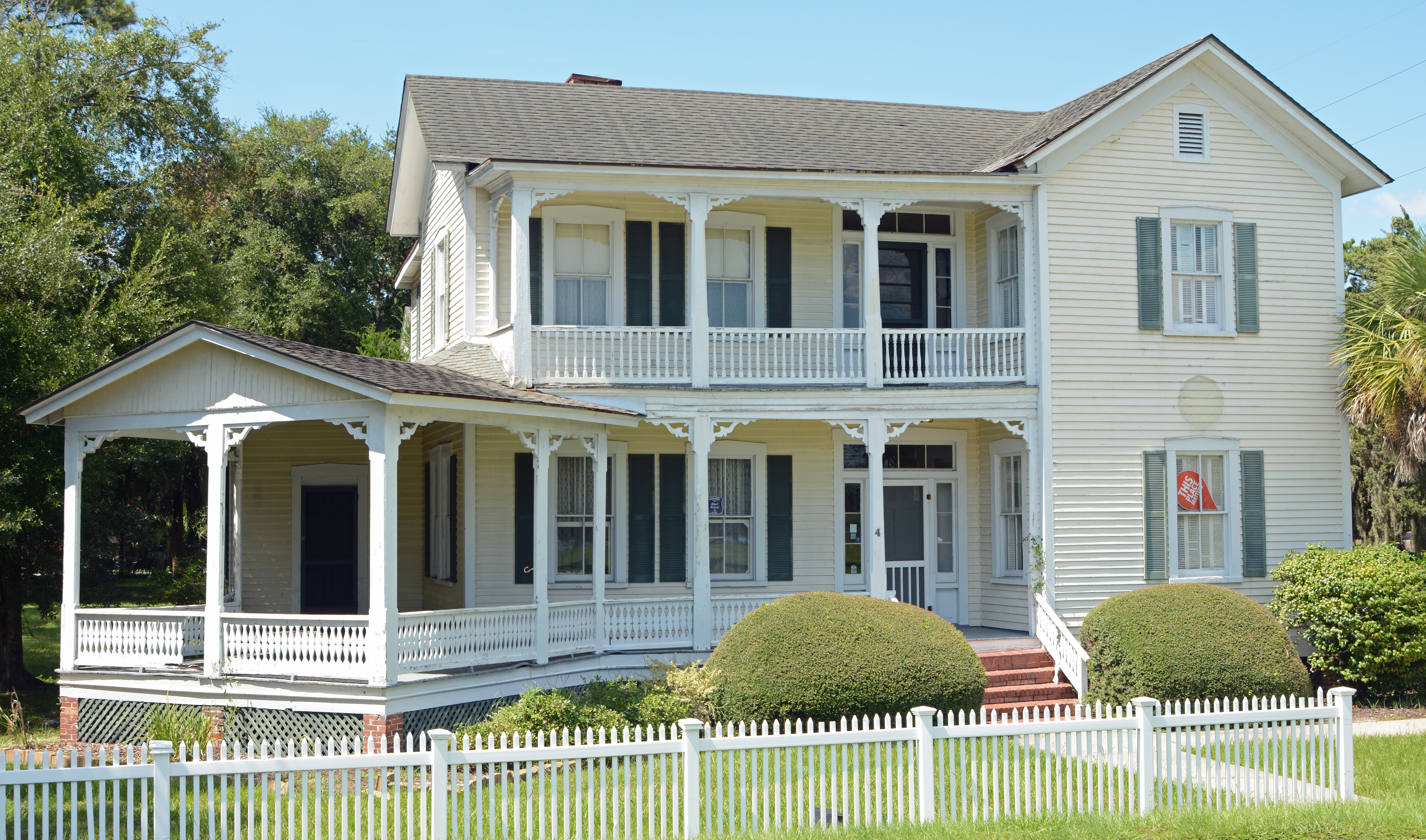
The Dart House (1877), which was used by the Chamber of Commerce. It was listed is a Place in Peril and was demolished in 2017.

The Brunswick Parks and Recreation Department operates city parks and squares. Six city squares were part of Brunswick's original 1771 Town Plan. The two largest central squares were Wright and Hanover. Though half of Wright Square was built on by a middle school in the 1950s, the square was recently returned to its original size with George Street removed through the middle. Five of the six still exist today, with Hillsboro Square converted into the campus of Glynn Academy High School. There are also two additional squares located within the city, Orange, and Palmetto. Numerous parks exist in the city, the largest being Howard Coffin Park. The parks include features such as playgrounds, baseball fields, softball fields, soccer fields, basketball courts, and picnic areas. Coffin Park includes a walking track. The district also owns the Roosevelt Lawrence Community Center, a center equipped with popular and traditional recreational game tables, two classrooms, and a multi-purpose gymnasium.

The Brunswick area is rich in live oak trees, particularly the southern live oak. Such is the quality of the live oak trees in the Brunswick and the Golden Isles area that Revolutionary warships such as the USS Constitution (nicknamed Old Ironsides) were clad in St. Simons Island oak planks. Brunswick has a notable live oak named Lover's Oak (located at Prince and Albany streets). As of 2005, it is approximately 900 years old. According to the State of Georgia and American Indian folklore, Native American braves and their maidens would meet under the oak. Another notable oak, Lanier's Oak, is notable as being the location where poet Sidney Lanier, on one of his visits to Brunswick, was inspired to write "The Marshes of Glynn".

Blythe Island Regional Park is located on Blythe Island within the city.

== Government ==
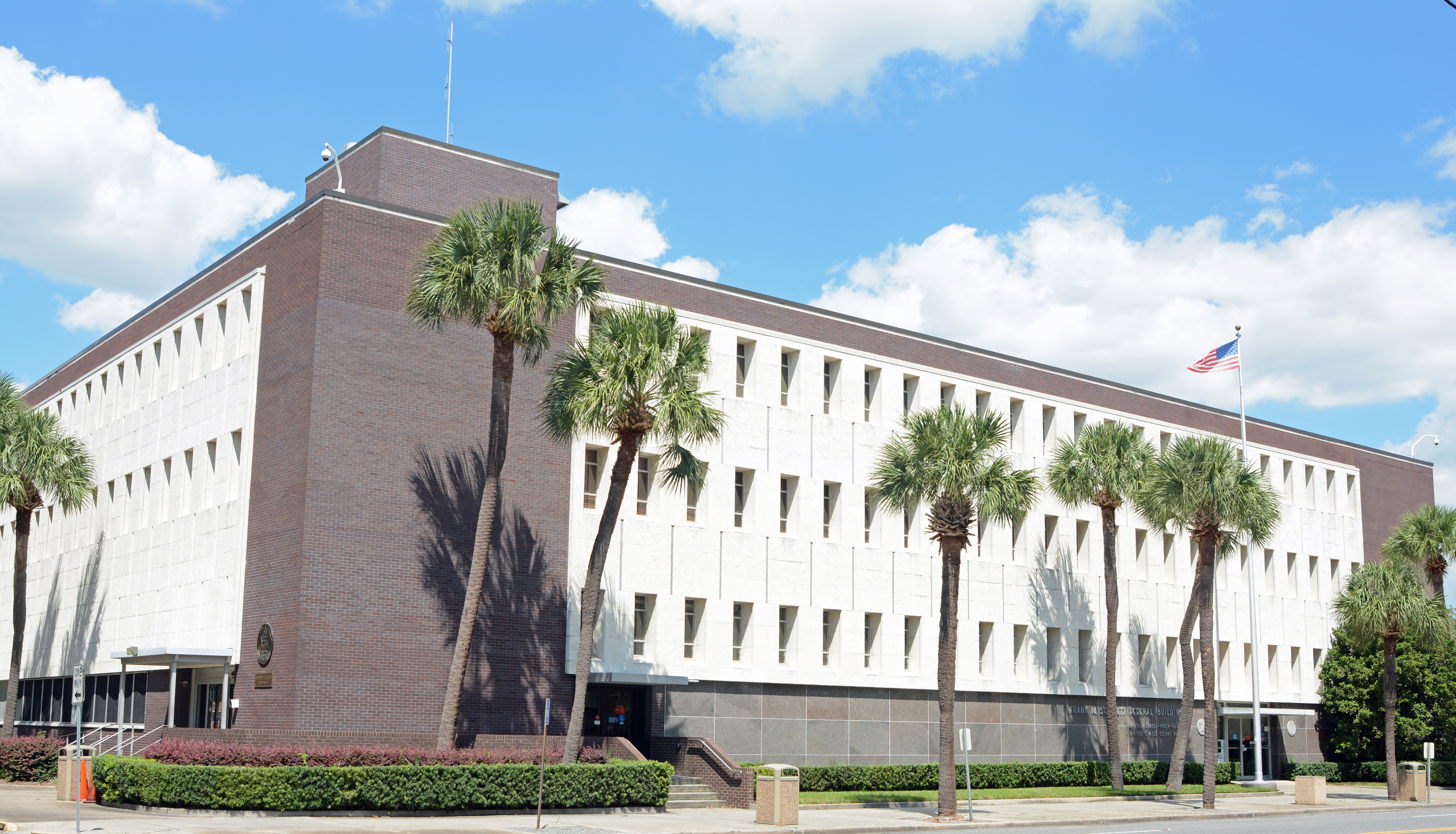
Frank Scarlett Federal Building (Post Office and Federal Court), on the National Register of Historic Places

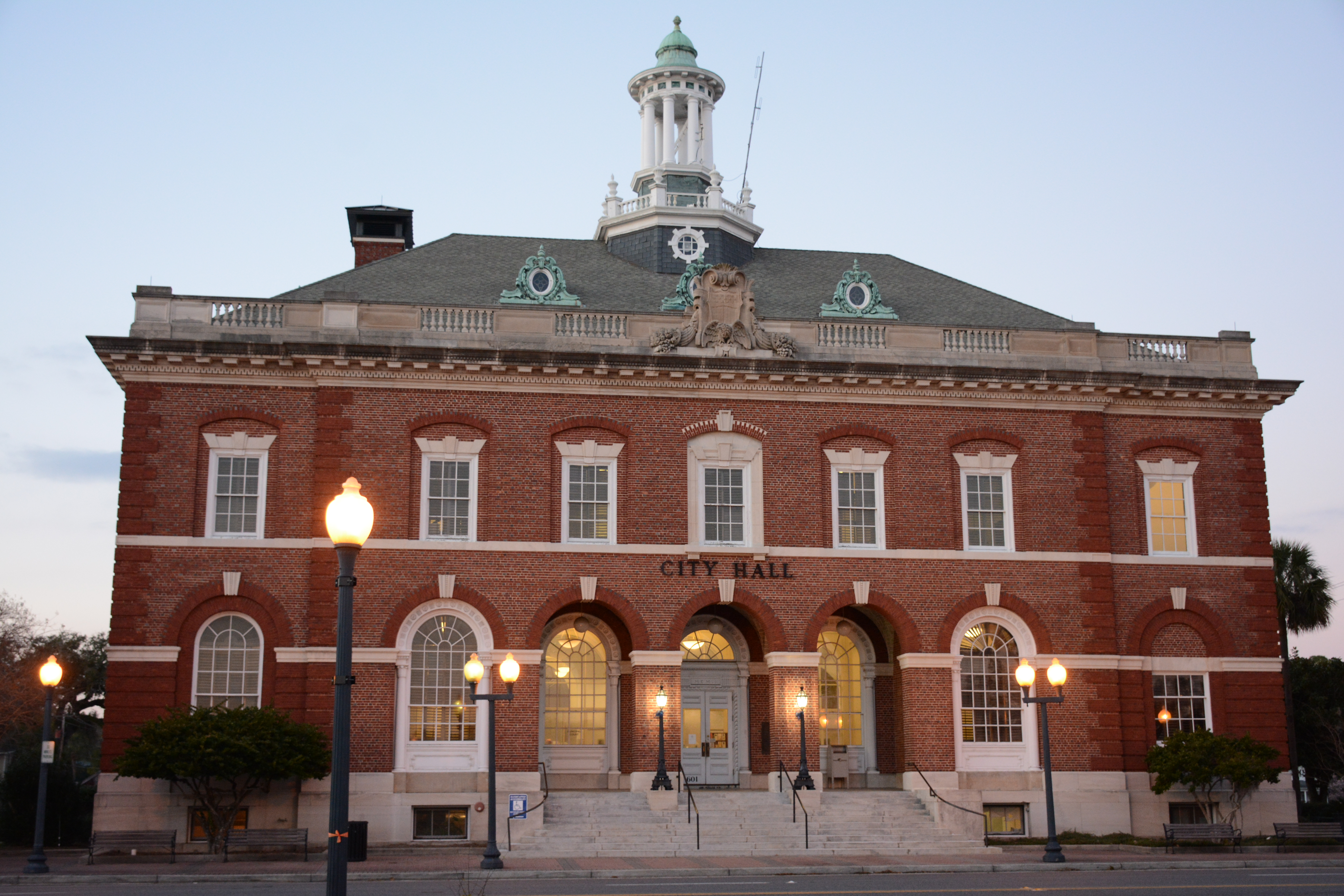
City hall

Brunswick uses the council-manager model of municipal government. The city commission consists of five individuals, including the mayor, elected on a plurality-at-large basis. Commissioners constitute the legislative body of the city and, as a group, are responsible for taxation, appropriations, ordinances, and other general functions. The mayor of Brunswick is Cosby Johnson, who was elected in 2021 and is the second African-American mayor of Brunswick. Johnson is also the first Millennial Mayor of Brunswick.

The city is divided into two wards with each ward electing two city commission representatives. The mayor serves as an at-large commissioner and chairperson. The commission meets twice each month at Old City Hall in Old Town. The city commission appoints a city manager to serve at will for an infinite term. The main duty of the manager is to implement policy set by the city commission and manage the operations of the city on a daily basis. The city manager is to see that all laws, provisions of the city charter, and any acts of the city commission are executed and enforced. The city manager of Brunswick is Regina McDuffie.

In November 2008, Mayor Thompson and the city commission of Brunswick traveled to Ganzhou to strengthen ties between the two cities. Ganzhou, a city with a population of 8.5 million, reciprocated, sending a delegation to Brunswick where an official sister city agreement was signed at Old Brunswick City Hall on April 3, 2009.

== Education ==
=== Higher education ===
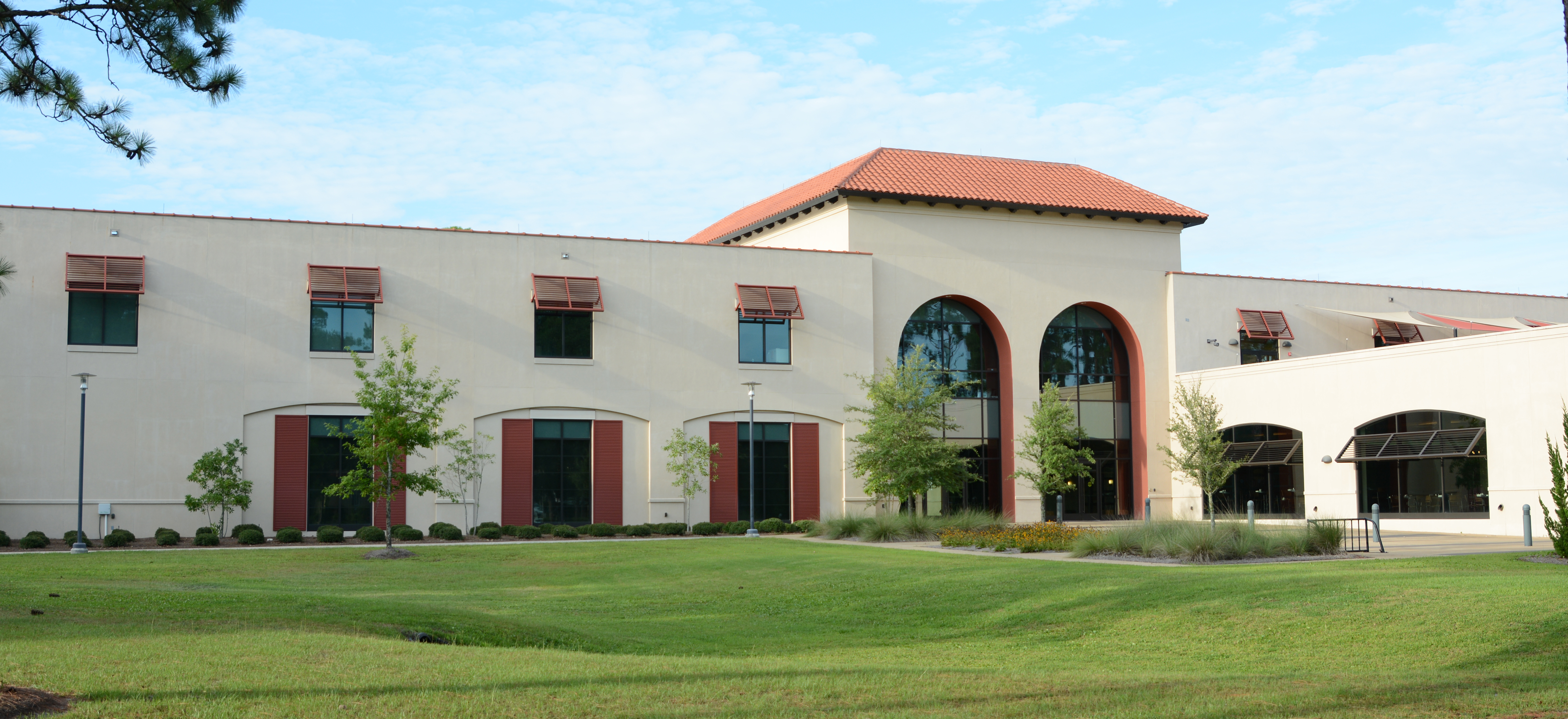
College of Coastal Georgia

Brunswick is home to the College of Coastal Georgia, which has more than 3,000 enrolled students. Since 1961, the college had been a two-year institution, but in 2008, the college began its transition to a four-year institution. The college is currently a state college within the University System of Georgia, with bachelor's degree programs in education, business, and nursing sciences, and other associate degree programs designed to prepare students to transfer to senior colleges and universities.

=== Primary and secondary schools ===
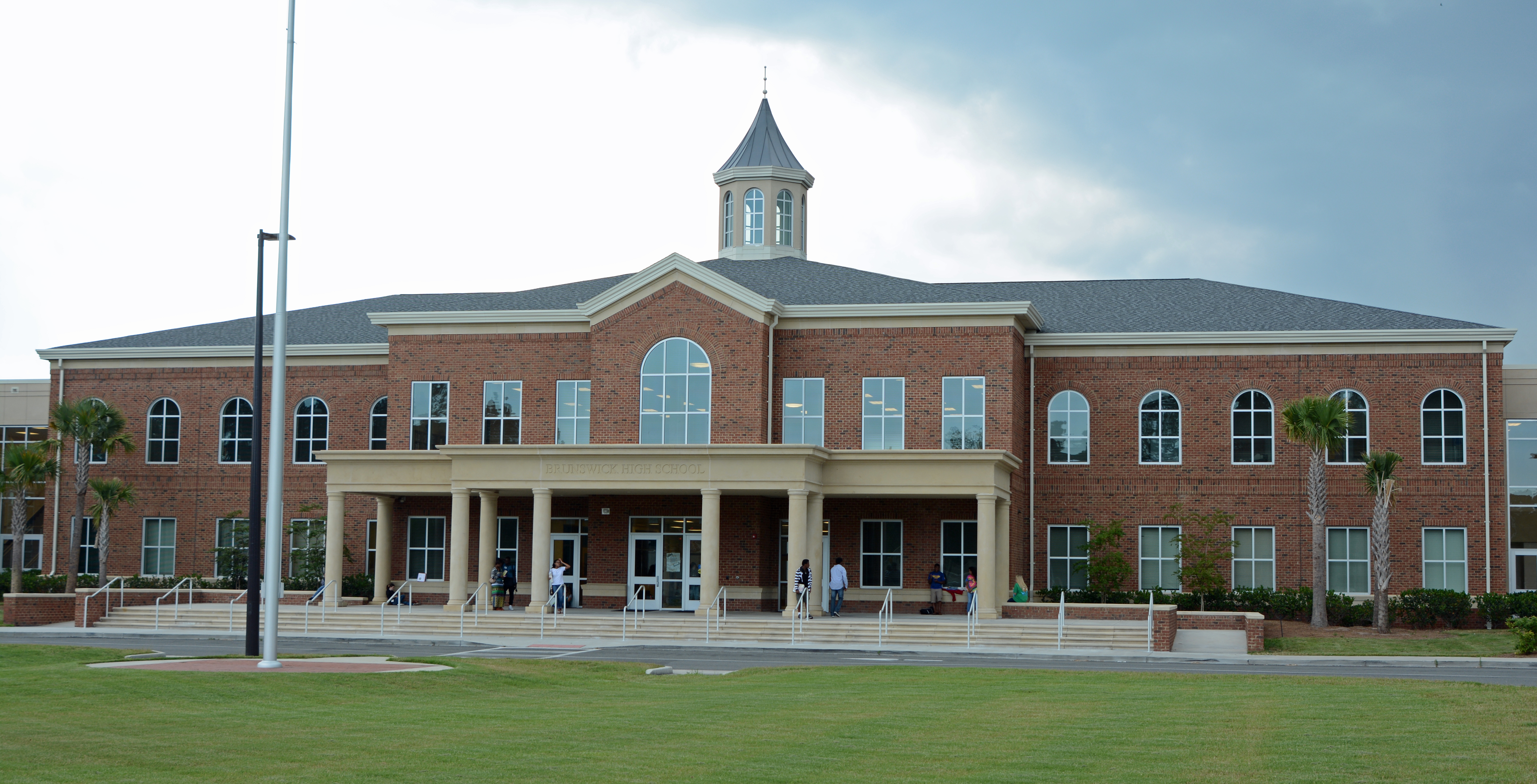
Brunswick High School

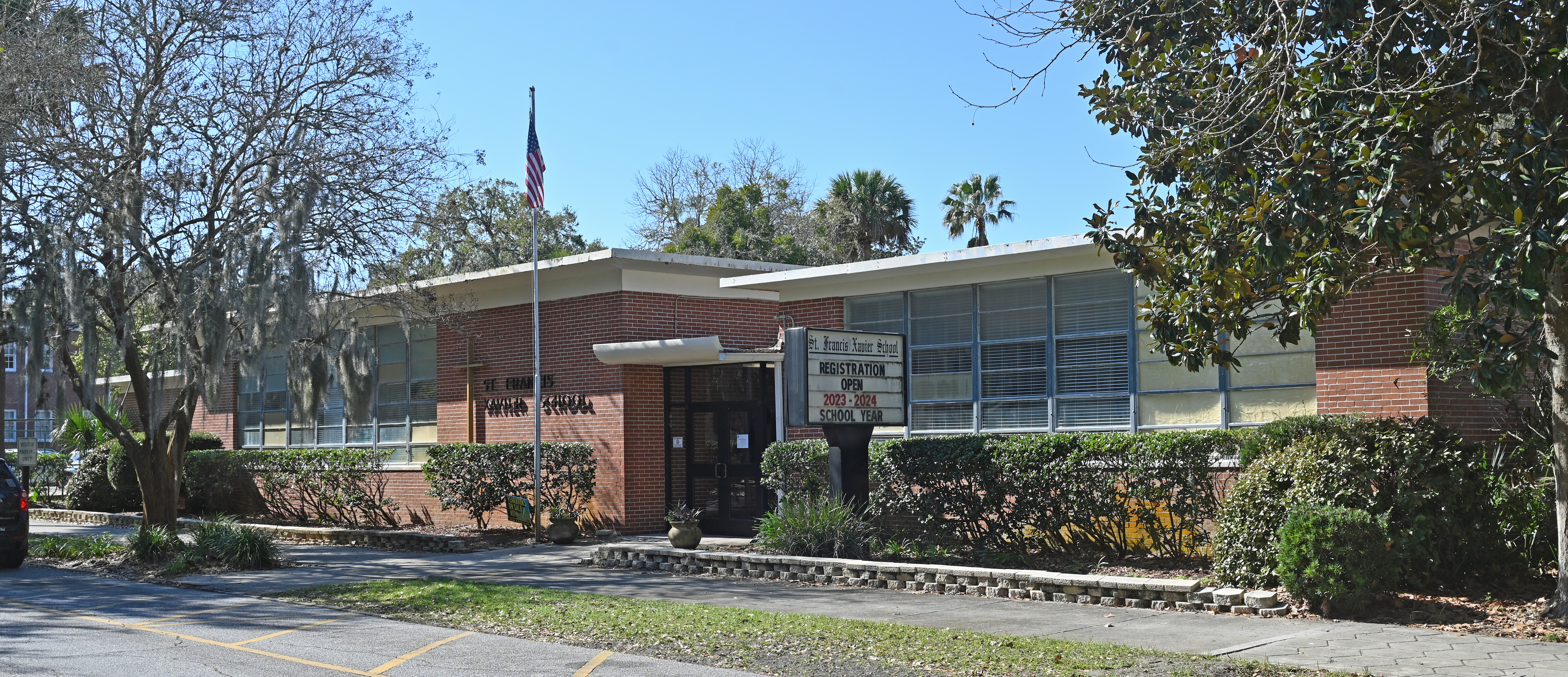
St. Francis Xavier School

The Glynn County School System is the governing authority of public schools in the city. More than 12,000 students attend schools in the school system. There are ten elementary schools, four middle schools, and two high schools: Brunswick High School and Glynn Academy. Glynn Academy, the second-oldest public high school in the American South and the sixth-oldest public high school in the United States, was founded in 1788 by an act of the Georgia General Assembly. Brunswick High School opened in 1967. Specialized institutions include a career-technical academy.

There are several private schools operating in the area. In the city, there is one Catholic school and one Seventh-day Adventist school. There are also Baptist, Pentecostal, and non-denominational Christian schools north of the city, such as Heritage Christian Academy. On St. Simons Island, there is a Presbyterian school. Several smaller Christian schools in Brunswick offer high school education.

== Media ==
The Brunswick News, the city's locally published daily newspaper

The Brunswick News is one of two major daily newspapers serving Brunswick; the other is The Georgia Times-Union, a subsidiary of the Jacksonville-based Florida Times-Union. Brunswick has one free weekly newspaper delivered to most homes in Glynn County, The Harbor Sound (a free publication). The Islander is a weekly paper, member of the Georgia Press Association, and available at newsstands or by subscription.

The major AM radio stations in Brunswick are WSFN 790, an ESPN affiliate and primarily a sports station; WGIG 1440; and WBGA 1490, which are all news and talk stations. The city's FM stations include NPR affiliate WWIO-FM 88.9, public radio WWEZ at 94.7 (St. Simons Island) and 97.5 (Brunswick), and commercial stations WAYR-FM 90.7, WSSI 92.7, WMUV 100.7, WSOL 101.5, WYNR 102.5, WQGA 103.3, WRJY 104.1, WXMK 105.9, and WHFX 107.7. 96.3

WPXC-TV, channel 21, an Ion affiliate, is the only broadcast television station in Brunswick. The station became an ABC affiliate in 1996, but in 2001, Allbritton Communications sold the station and, therefore, the station lost its affiliation. All major U.S. television networks are represented in Brunswick from Jacksonville and Savannah-based television stations.

== In popular culture ==
Brunswick has been featured in scenes from the films The View from Pompey's Head (1955), Conrack (1974), The Longest Yard (1974), and the documentary Criminalizing Dissent (2006).

The city is also the setting for the novel Ravens by author George Dawes Green.

== Infrastructure ==
=== Transportation ===
Sidney Lanier Bridge

Brunswick Golden Isles Airport (BQK, KBQK) is served by Delta Air Lines, with several daily round trips to the Hartsfield–Jackson Atlanta International Airport. The city was formerly served by DayJet, with service to cities in Alabama, Florida, and Georgia; the company suspended its operations in September 2008.

Two railway companies serve the city: CSX and Norfolk Southern. The Golden Isles Terminal Railroad is a short line operating 12.6 miles (20.3 km) of mainline trackage between Anguilla Junction and the Colonel's Island and Marine Port terminals of the Port of Brunswick. This line connects with a line that originates in Old Town Brunswick at Anguilla Junction. Brunswick last had direct passenger service in 1966 or 1967 with the unnamed successor to the Southern Railway's Kansas City-Florida Special. Amtrak passenger service is available in Jesup, 40 mi (64 km) northwest of the city.

The original Sidney Lanier Bridge was a vertical-lift bridge on U.S. 17 crossing the Brunswick River and was opened on June 22, 1956. On November 7, 1972, the ship African Neptune struck the bridge, causing parts of the bridge to collapse, taking cars with it. The accident resulted in ten deaths. On May 3, 1987, the bridge was again struck by a ship, the Polish freighter Ziemia Bialostocka. A new cable-stayed bridge with the same name opened in 2003 to allow larger ships to enter the port and to eliminate the need for the drawbridge on U.S. 17. It is the longest-spanning bridge in Georgia. The elevation at the top of the support towers is 480 feet (150 m).

Three federal highways pass through Brunswick: U.S. Route 17, U.S. Route 341, and U.S. Route 25. U.S. 17 runs north to south through the eastern part of town and is a four-lane highway. U.S. 341 overlaps U.S. 25 for almost the entire route and originates in Brunswick off U.S. 17. Interstate 95 runs west and northwest of the city, and U.S. Route 82 originates at the junction of U.S. 17 and State Route 303 just west of I-95.

In 2006, Glynn County applied for approximately $930,000 for first-year funding for a transit service. The county and city match was for over $100,000 combined. The first-year project would fund the purchase of up to four buses, two vans, signage, equipment, and facility improvements. As of 2007 the first-year application was pending with the Georgia DOT and the Federal Transit Administration.

=== Healthcare ===
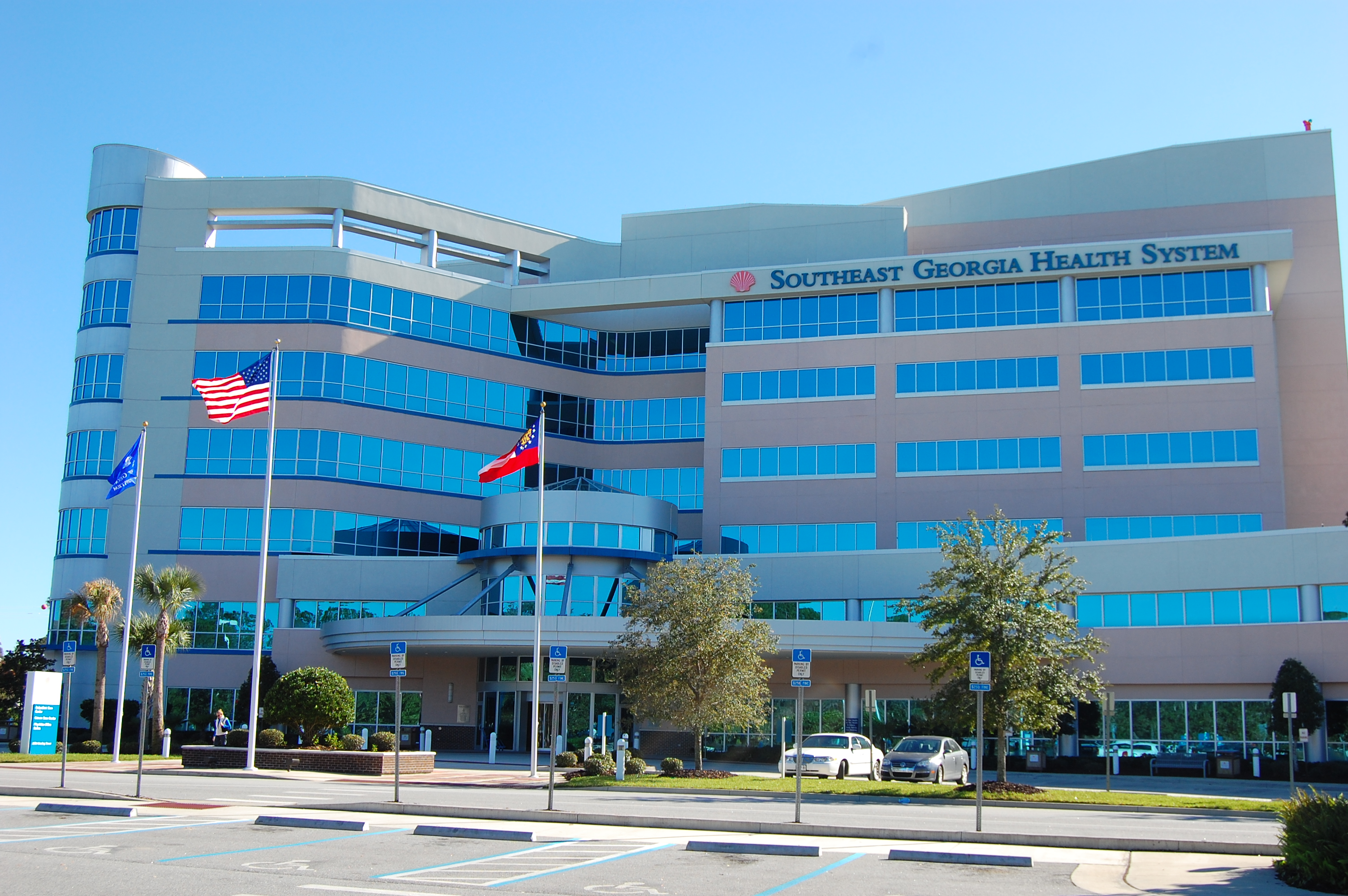
Southeast Georgia Health System's Brunswick campus

With over 1,321 employees and over 201 physicians, Southeast Georgia Health System is the main provider of health care in Brunswick and the surrounding area and is also the largest private employer in Brunswick. Southeast Georgia Health System's medical campus in the city offers a 316-bed full-service hospital. Southeast Georgia Health System Brunswick campus also has an alliance with the International Seafarer's Center that provides first-class medical attention to seamen who come into the Brunswick port; the medical needs of approximately 15,000 international merchant seafarers are met each year. Southeast Georgia Health System also operates a 180-bed skilled nursing facility in Brunswick, The Senior Care Center, which offers short-term rehabilitation services, as well as long-term care.

Southeast Georgia Health System recently opened the Outpatient Care Center on the Brunswick campus. This six-story, 195,000-square-foot (18,100 m^{2}) building includes outpatient surgery and imaging services, the Cancer Care Center, a retail area, the Dick Mitchell Health Information Center, as well as physician offices and suites.

In 2004, the Brunswick campus was named Best Large Hospital in the State of Georgia by the Georgia Alliance of Community Hospitals.

== Sister cities ==
- Ganzhou, Jiangxi, People's Republic of China
- Ilan, Yilan County, Taiwan

Brunswick has an active sister cities program designed to encourage cultural and economic exchanges.

== Notable people ==
- Anthony Alaimo, United States federal judge
- Spencer Atkinson, orthodontist
- Sam Bowen, baseball player
- Morgan Brian, Women's World Cup soccer champion with Team USA 2016; plays professional soccer for Houston Dash
- Kwame Brown, NBA player, top pick of 2001 NBA draft
- Barret Browning, baseball player
- Francis Buzzacott, frontiersman and writer, buried at Palmetto Cemetery.
- Justin Coleman, NFL cornerback for the Detroit Lions
- DeeJay Dallas, NFL running back for the Arizona Cardinals
- Ed Dudley, professional golfer, first club professional at Augusta National
- Amos Easton, also known as Bumble Bee Slim, musician
- Steven C. Frucci, judge of the Court of Appeals of Virginia
- Freeman Hankins, Pennsylvania State Representative from 1961 to 1968, Pennsylvania State Senator from 1967 to 1988
- Mary Hood, writer
- Anna Jay, professional wrestler in AEW
- Eleanor La Mance, opera singer
- ReShard Lee, football player
- Davis Love III, professional golfer and Ryder Cup captain
- Jack McDevitt, science-fiction writer, Nebula Award for Best Novel winner
- Kristen Morgin, sculptor
- Jack Peerson, baseball player
- Harry Pickens, jazz pianist
- Tony Pierce, baseball player
- Antonio Santiago, one-year-old victim of a highly publicized murder
- Darius Slay, NFL cornerback for the Philadelphia Eagles
- Doris Buchanan Smith, author of A Taste of Blackberries
- Raymond M. Lloyd, Professional Wrestler of WCW
- Aaron Swinson, Cincinnati Bearcats assistant coach (college basketball), and former player
- Albert Tresvant, first African-American mayor of Opa-locka, Florida
- Adam Wainwright, baseball pitcher for St. Louis Cardinals (birthplace)
- Tracy Walker, NFL safety for the Detroit Lions
- Ike Williams, professional boxer, former lightweight champion
- Madaline A. Williams, first African American woman elected to the New Jersey Legislature
- Marion Wilson, murderer

== See also ==
- 1898 Georgia hurricane
- Clark Quarry
- History of Brunswick, Georgia
- Oglethorpe Hotel
