= WHFX =

- Darien, Georgia; United States
- Broadcast area: Brunswick, Georgia
- Frequency: 107.7 MHz
- Branding: 107.7 The Fox

Programming
- Format: Mainstream rock

Ownership
- Owner: iHeartMedia, Inc.; (iHM Licenses, LLC)
- Sister stations: WBGA, WGIG, WQGA, WYNR

History
- First air date: September 9, 1991; 34 years ago (as WYNR)
- Former call signs: WYNR (1991–2002); WBGA (2002–2005)

Technical information
- Licensing authority: FCC
- Facility ID: 63431
- Class: C2
- ERP: 50,000 watts
- HAAT: 147 meters (482 ft)
- Transmitter coordinates: 31°10′9.00″N 81°32′14.00″W

Links
- Public license information: Public file; LMS
- Webcast: Listen Live
- Website: 1077thefox.iheart.com

WHFX (107.7 FM) is a radio station broadcasting a mainstream rock format. Licensed to Darien, Georgia, United States, the station serves the Brunswick area. The station is owned by iHeartMedia, Inc., through licensee iHM Licenses, LLC.

== History ==
The station went on the air as WYNR on September 9, 1991. On October 8, 2002, the station changed its call sign to WBGA, and on April 4, 2005, to the current WHFX.

On May 15, 2014, Qantum Communications announced that it would sell its 29 stations, including WHFX, to Clear Channel Communications (now iHeartMedia), in a transaction connected to Clear Channel's sale of WALK AM-FM in Patchogue, New York to Connoisseur Media via Qantum. The transaction was consummated on September 9, 2014.

On October 29, 2018, it was announced that, as iHeartMedia would lose its grandfathered ownership limits in the Brunswick and Grand Forks markets as part of its bankruptcy restructuring, the company would place KSNR and WHFX into the newly formed Sun & Snow Station Trust, under the oversight of former Backyard Broadcasting CEO Barry Drake, as preparation for an eventual sale of the signals. However, iHeartMedia was able to take WHFX back from the trust on September 3, 2019, due to sister station WSOL-FM (serving the adjacent Jacksonville market) changing its city of license to Yulee, Florida.

Home station of Brunswick High Pirates Football.
