= Eleanor La Mance =

American singer (1898–1985)

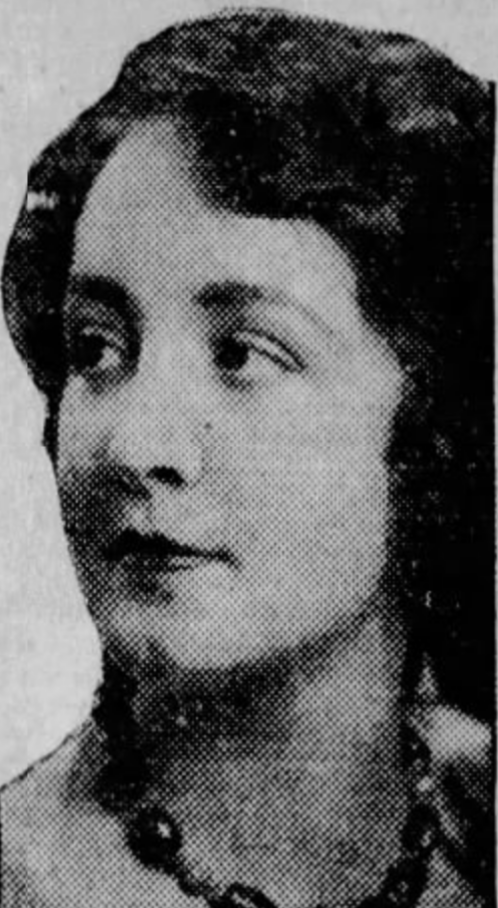
- Eleanor La Mance, from a 1929 publication
- Born: July 31, 1898; Brunswick, Georgia, U.S.
- Died: June 27, 1985 (aged 86); St. Petersburg, Florida, U.S.
- Other names: Nell Lamance, Eleanor Longone, Elen Longone
- Occupation(s): Opera singer, Broadway performer

Eleanor La Mance Longone (July 31, 1898 – June 27, 1985), also known as Elen Longone, was an American mezzo-soprano or contralto singer in opera and in musicals. She joined the Metropolitan Opera in 1929.

== Early life and education ==
La Mance was born in Brunswick, Georgia, and raised in Jacksonville, Florida, the daughter of Reed Ervine La Mance and Sarah Elizabeth Cherry La Mance. She trained as a singer in France and Italy.

== Career ==
La Mance performed in Europe, South America, and Egypt as a young woman. She was with the William Wade Hinshaw Company in 1925 and 1926. and was a visiting artist at the Mayflower Hotel in 1926. La Mance was considered a stage beauty.

La Mance joined the Metropolitan Opera in 1929. At the Met, she appeared in Rigoletto (1929), Manon Lescaut (1929), Cavalleria rusticana (1929), and several special concerts. After her recital at Town Hall in 1930, The New York Times reported that she had "ample range and power and unusually brilliant timbre". On Broadway, she played Alan-a-Dale in the 1932 revival of Robin Hood.

La Mance sang with the Chicago City Opera in the 1930s, including roles in Aida, Il trovatore and La fiamma (1936). She played Azucena in Il trovatore in 1940 in San Juan, Puerto Rico, in a production that included Leonard Warren and Arthur Carron.

During World War II, she traveled with the United Service Organizations to entertain American troops in Italy, North Africa, and Alaska. After the war, she worked in radio in New York City.

== Personal life ==
La Mance married Chicago City Opera director Paolo (Paul) Longone in 1935, in Chicago. Her husband died in 1939. She died in 1985, at the age of 86, in St. Petersburg, Florida.
