= WXMK =

- Dock Junction, Georgia; United States
- Broadcast area: Brunswick, Georgia
- Frequency: 105.9 MHz
- Branding: Magic 105.9

Programming
- Format: Hot adult contemporary

Ownership
- Owner: Golden Isles Broadcasting, LLC
- Sister stations: WRJY, WSSI

Technical information
- Licensing authority: FCC
- Facility ID: 61418
- Class: C3
- ERP: 15,000 watts
- HAAT: 128 meters (420 ft)
- Transmitter coordinates: 31°11′39.00″N 81°29′30.00″W

Links
- Public license information: Public file; LMS
- Webcast: Listen Live
- Website: magic1059.com

WXMK (105.9 FM) is a radio station broadcasting a hot adult contemporary format. Licensed to Dock Junction, Georgia, United States, the station serves the Brunswick area. Better known as Magic 105.9 "The Golden Isles' Number 1 Hit Music Station." The station is currently owned by Golden Isles Broadcasting, LLC.
