= WQGA =

- Waycross, Georgia; United States
- Broadcast area: Brunswick, Georgia/ Jacksonville, Florida
- Frequency: 103.3 MHz
- Branding: 103Q

Programming
- Format: Hot adult contemporary
- Affiliations: Westwood One; The Weather Channel

Ownership
- Owner: iHeartMedia, Inc.; (iHM Licenses, LLC)
- Sister stations: WBGA, WHFX, WGIG, WYNR

History
- Former call signs: WACL-FM (1978–1988); WHFX (1988–1996); WFGA (1996–1998); WWSN (1998–2010)

Technical information
- Licensing authority: FCC
- Facility ID: 65020
- Class: C0
- ERP: 100,000 watts
- HAAT: 303 meters (994 ft)
- Transmitter coordinates: 31°9′22.00″N 81°58′19.00″W

Links
- Public license information: Public file; LMS
- Webcast: Listen Live
- Website: my103q.iheart.com

WQGA (103.3 FM, "103Q") is a commercial radio station licensed to Waycross, Georgia, and serving the Brunswick, Georgia, and Jacksonville, Florida, area. The station is owned by iHeartMedia, Inc., through licensee iHM Licenses, LLC, and airs a hot adult contemporary radio format.

The station airs The Kidd Kraddick Morning Show, syndicated from Westwood One.

== History ==
The station was assigned the call letters WACL-FM on August 2, 1978. On July 1, 1988, the station changed its call sign to WHFX, on March 22, 1996, to WFGA, on March 23, 1998, to WWSN, and on September 13, 2010, to the current WQGA.

On May 15, 2014, Qantum Communications announced that it would sell its 29 stations, including WQGA, to Clear Channel Communications (now iHeartMedia), in a transaction connected to Clear Channel's sale of WALK AM-FM in Patchogue, New York to Connoisseur Media via Qantum. The transaction was consummated on September 9, 2014.
