= Murder of Antonio Santiago =

Murder of an infant during an attempted robbery

- Antonio Santiago playing with baby toys
- Location: Brunswick, Georgia, U.S.
- Date: March 21, 2013; 13 years ago
- Attack type: Child murder by shooting, infanticide, armed robbery
- Deaths: Antonio Santiago, aged 1
- Injuries: Sherry West
- Motive: Robbery
- Charges: Elkins: Malice murder; Possession of a firearm during the commission of a felony; Elkins and Lang: Felony murder (2 counts); Aggravated assault (3 counts); Attempted armed robbery; First-degree cruelty to children; Karimah and Sabrina: Tampering with evidence Karimah and Katrina: Making a false statement
- Verdict: Elkins: Guilty on all counts Lang: Pleaded guilty to attempted armed robbery Remaining charges dropped Karimah: Not guilty of making a false statement Guilty of tampering with evidence Sabrina and Katrina: Pleaded guilty
- Sentence: De'Marquise: Life imprisonment without the possibility of parole, plus 125 years Lang: 2 years in prison plus 8 years probation Karimah: 10 years in prison Katrina: 5 years in prison Sabrina: 5 years probation
- Convicted: De'Marquise Elkins; Dominique Lang; Karimah Elkins; Sabrina Elkins; Katrina Elkins

One-year-old Antonio Santiago was murdered on March 21, 2013, during an attempted robbery in Brunswick, Georgia, United States. As Antonio and his mother, Sherry West, were returning home from the post office, they were confronted by two youths, 15-year-old Dominique Lang and 17-year-old De'Marquise Elkins. Elkins, who had previously shot another victim he tried to rob, pointed a gun at West and demanded money. When she did not comply, he fired two .22-caliber bullets, one of which grazed her head, and the other of which went through her leg. Elkins then shot Antonio between the sleeping baby's eyes at point-blank range, killing him. The murder received international attention due to the victim's young age.

Lang pleaded guilty to attempted armed robbery, and was sentenced to eight years of probation. Elkins was tried and convicted in August 2013 and sentenced to life in prison without parole. He was not eligible for the death penalty because he was under 18 at the time of the crime. Several of Elkins's relatives were also convicted of, and pleaded guilty to, charges related to covering up the crime. In 2019, the Georgia Supreme Court ordered the trial court to review whether Elkins had been properly sentenced.

== Background ==
=== Victims ===
Antonio Angel Santiago was born on February 7, 2012, to Louis Santiago and Sherry West. He turned one year old six weeks before his death and had learned to walk but not how to talk. He was the second son West lost to violence; her other son was stabbed to death at the age of 18 in New Jersey in 2008.

=== Perpetrator ===
De'Marquise Elkins

De'Marquise Elkins was born in 1995. According to defense counsel, he experienced neglect from his drug-addicted mother as a child. Prior to murdering Antonio, Elkins attempted to rob a pastor named Wilfredo Calix-Flores on March 11, 2013, at the pastor's church in Brunswick. Elkins and two accomplices pointed a pistol at Calix-Flores and demanded his cell phone and money. Because the pastor did not have anything to give them, they shot him. The bullet penetrated his arm and chest. After shooting Calix-Flores, the perpetrators ran away.

== Murder ==
On March 21, 2013, West decided to get some exercise and stroll Antonio to the post office. The mother and son were confronted by Elkins and Lang at 9:00 am while returning home.

According to Lang, Elkins had previously said that he wanted to find a Mexican to rob. Elkins pointed a .22-caliber handgun at West and demanded money. When West said that she didn't have any money, Elkins threatened her, saying "give me your money or I'm going to kill you and I'm going to shoot your baby and kill your baby." West testified at the trial that she begged him not to kill her baby, pleading "Don't shoot my baby!"

Elkins tried to grab West's purse, and fired the gun after she said she had no money. The bullet grazed her head. Elkins then shot West in the leg and walked towards Antonio. Lang testified that Elkins hit West with the gun and counted down from five. West testified that she put her arms over Antonio and tried to stop the attacker from shooting him. She was unsuccessful and Elkins shot her baby between his eyes at point-blank range. The robbers then hit West with the revolver, tried to grab her purse, and fled.

West tried to revive her son with CPR, and witnesses called 9-1-1. Bystanders and rescue workers also tried to help Antonio, but were unsuccessful; he was pronounced dead at the scene.

Subsequently, Elkins's mother, Karimah Elkins, threw the gun her son had used to commit the murder into a marsh, to cover up evidence.

== Criminal proceedings ==
=== Investigation and indictments ===
Brunswick police received an anonymous tip, and tracked down Lang on March 22. Lang was cooperative, admitting to being involved in the crime and directing police to Elkins. On March 23, West identified Elkins from a lineup of 24 mugshots, and on March 25, Elkins's mother Karimah and his aunt, Katrina Elkins, led investigators to the pond containing the weapon used in the murder. On March 27, a grand jury indicted Elkins on 11 counts, including malice murder, aggravated assault, attempted armed robbery, and first-degree cruelty to children. Lang was indicted on seven counts, including felony murder, aggravated assault, attempted armed robbery, and first-degree cruelty to children. Elkins's mother was indicted on making false statements to police and evidence tampering. His aunt was indicted on making false statements to police, and his sister Sabrina was indicted on evidence tampering.

=== Trial ===
Both De'Marquise and Karimah Elkins were tried together in August 2013. Due to the extensive publicity the crime received locally, the trial was held in Marietta, Georgia, 300 miles away from Brunswick.

Prosecutors told jurors that Elkins pointed a gun at West and demanded money, and then shot Antonio when she did not comply. Defense counsel suggested that Antonio's parents were involved in his death and that they did not want their baby. The defense also told jurors that West tried to take out a life insurance policy shortly after the murder and that she may have been mentally incapable of identifying the shooter. Additionally, they pointed to gunshot residue on Antonio's parents' hands, although a Georgia Bureau of Investigation report explained that gunshot residue can end up on shooting victims. The victim's father, Louis Santiago, said that he had touched the wound on West's leg before having his hands swabbed. The defense also accused police of focusing their investigation too quickly on the wrong suspects and rushing to get the matter resolved.

Lang testified against Elkins after being questioned in front of the judge without the jury present. The defense filed a motion to suppress his testimony, claiming that he was not credible. Judge Stephen Kelly denied the motion, and allowed Lang to testify before the jury. Lang testified that Elkins hit West with the gun and counted down from five before shooting Antonio.

West also testified, explaining that the robbers demanded money, and that Elkins threatened to shoot Antonio when she didn't comply. According to West's testimony, Elkins then shot her before turning towards Antonio and shooting him. She told jurors that she "tried to stop him", and that she "put [her] arms over [her] baby, but [Elkins] still shot him". In addition to giving testimony, West identified Elkins as the murderer. The defense counsel asked her about the medication she took for mental health disorders, and asked if she could have had a psychotic episode when police questioned her. They also questioned why she would walk her son through a neighborhood that she knew was dangerous.

Closing arguments were held on August 30. The jury began deliberations later that day. After two hours, they found Elkins guilty of 11 counts, including two counts of felony murder, one count of malice murder, cruelty to children, and possession of a handgun during a crime. The jury also found Elkins guilty of the attempted robbery and aggravated assault of Reverend Calix-Flores. Karimah Elkins was found guilty of tampering with evidence, but was acquitted of lying to police.

=== Sentencing ===
Elkins was not eligible for the death penalty because he was under 18 years of age when he murdered Antonio. The maximum punishment allowed was life in prison without parole. In an attempt to prevent Elkins from getting a life without parole sentence, the defense introduced court documents showing that he had experienced neglect, being left home alone without food by his drug-addicted mother. They also said that life without parole for a juvenile constituted cruel and unusual punishment. The prosecutors disagreed, pointing to the nature of the crime: "He aimed that gun right between that baby's eyes and shot that baby," said District Attorney Jackie Johnson. "I don't know of a more inhumane act or wantonly vile act ... than to aim a gun at a sleeping baby in a stroller and take that baby's life." West addressed the court in a victim impact statement made to sound like a nursery rhyme or poem. "His first word was never heard. His first sentence was never said, he never got to sleep in a toddler bed." She also asked the judge to punish Elkins for taking "the love of my life". Judge Kelly sentenced Elkins to life without parole for murdering Antonio. In addition to the life without parole sentence, Elkins was sentenced to 125 years in prison for other crimes committed against West and Calix-Flores. Elkins is currently imprisoned at the maximum-security Macon State Prison. Karimah Elkins was sentenced to 10 years in prison.

=== Plea deals ===
Lang's attorneys initially tried to have his case moved to juvenile court. They later worked out a plea agreement with prosecutors in which Lang would be sentenced to two years in prison in addition to eight years' probation for one count of attempted armed robbery. He received credit for the two years he had already spent incarcerated. Under the agreement, he can only go to certain designated places, and faces 30 years in prison should he violate probation. He was also ordered to have no contact with West and to pay a $1,500 fine. West later expressed disappointment with the sentence in a statement to the court.

Elkins's sister Sabrina pleaded guilty to tampering with evidence, and was sentenced to spend six months in a work camp and five years on probation. Elkins's aunt Katrina also pleaded guilty to making a false statement, and was sentenced to five years in prison.

=== Appeals ===
Elkins appealed to the Supreme Court of Georgia. He argued that: the trial court violated his constitutional rights by preventing him from showing that another person committed the crimes; he was denied a fair trial and the presumption of innocence due to the jury learning that he had a juvenile criminal record; and he was denied effective assistance of counsel. The Supreme Court of Georgia found that there was sufficient evidence to support his convictions. They ruled that Elkins's constitutional rights were not violated and that he had not been denied a fair trial or the presumption of innocence. The Court did rule that the trial judge erred by refusing to hold a hearing on his claim that his lawyer did not effectively handle a motion seeking a different sentence. They ordered the trial court to review whether he was properly sentenced to life without parole. Elkins's lawyers want him to be sentenced to life in prison with the possibility of parole.

== Aftermath ==
The murder of Antonio Santiago received national attention, as well as international attention, with BBC News and Sky News reporting on it. Within days of his death, a memorial for Antonio was established at the site of the murder, consisting of stuffed animals, a bible, and a framed photo of him. Additionally, an anonymous donor had the boy's name engraved on a stone at the Georgia Sea Turtle Center.
