= WGIG =

- Brunswick, Georgia; United States
- Broadcast area: Brunswick area
- Frequency: 1440 kHz
- Branding: 98.7 WGIG

Programming
- Format: News/talk
- Affiliations: Fox News Radio; Compass Media Networks; Premiere Networks; Westwood One

Ownership
- Owner: iHeartMedia, Inc.; (iHM Licenses, LLC)
- Sister stations: WBGA, WHFX, WQGA, WYNR

History
- Former call signs: WBGA (1983–1987)

Technical information
- Licensing authority: FCC
- Facility ID: 63432
- Class: B
- Power: 5,000 watts day 1,000 watts night
- Transmitter coordinates: 31°10′7.00″N 81°32′14.00″W
- Translator: 98.7 W254DO (Brunswick)

Links
- Public license information: Public file; LMS
- Webcast: Listen Live
- Website: 1440wgig.iheart.com

WGIG (1440 AM) is a radio station broadcasting a news/talk format. Licensed to Brunswick, Georgia, United States, the station serves the Brunswick area. The station is owned by iHeartMedia, Inc., through licensee iHM Licenses, LLC.

== History ==
The station was assigned the call letters WBGA on September 15, 1983. On August 29, 1987, the station changed its call sign to the current WGIG.

Many on air personalities have been employed by WGIG in their many years of service.

On Air Personalities-

Richard Anderson, also known as Rich Thomas (1983–1985)

Lauren Nobles, Hosted the local talk show Straight Talk (1996–2012)

Scott Ryfun, Current host of local talk show Straight Talk (2012–present)

On May 15, 2014, Qantum Communications announced that it would sell its 29 stations, including WGIG, to Clear Channel Communications (now iHeartMedia), in a transaction connected to Clear Channel's sale of WALK AM-FM in Patchogue, New York to Connoisseur Media via Qantum. The transaction was consummated on September 9, 2014.
