= WRJY =

Brunswick, Georgia; United States
- Broadcast area: Brunswick, Georgia
- Frequency: 104.1 MHz
- Branding: 104.1 the wave

Programming
- Format: Country music
- Affiliations: Motor Racing Network

Ownership
- Owner: Golden Isles Broadcasting, LLC
- Sister stations: WXMK, WSSI

History
- First air date: March 29, 1993 (as WAAE)
- Former call signs: WAAE (1993–1993); WSEG (1993–2003)

Technical information
- Licensing authority: FCC
- Facility ID: 472
- Class: A
- ERP: 4,200 watts
- HAAT: 119 meters (409 ft)
- Transmitter coordinates: 31°11′39.00″N 81°29′30.00″W

Links
- Public license information: Public file; LMS
- Website: thewave1041.com

WRJY (104.1 FM) is a radio station broadcasting a country music format. Licensed to Brunswick, Georgia, United States, the station serves the Brunswick area. The station is currently owned by Golden Isles Broadcasting, LLC and features programming from Motor Racing Network.

== History ==
The station went on the air as WAAE on March 29, 1993. On August 20 that year, the station changed its call sign to WSEG, & then on June 11, 2003, to the current WRJY.
