= WSSI =

- St. Simons Island, Georgia; United States
- Broadcast area: Brunswick, Georgia
- Frequency: 92.7 MHz
- Branding: 92.7 SSI

Programming
- Format: Classic hits

Ownership
- Owner: Golden Isles Broadcasting, LLC
- Sister stations: WRJY, WXMK

History
- First air date: December 4, 1989 (as WPFI)
- Former call signs: WPFI (1989–1991); WMOG-FM (1991–1995); WVVV (1995–1996); WHFX (1996–2005); WBGA (2005–2014); WMOG (2014–2016)
- Call sign meaning: W St. Simons Island

Technical information
- Licensing authority: FCC
- Facility ID: 36929
- Class: C3
- ERP: 7,000 watts
- HAAT: 100 meters (330 ft)
- Transmitter coordinates: 31°9′42.00″N 81°28′28.00″W

Links
- Public license information: Public file; LMS
- Website: GoldenIslesBroadcasting.com

WSSI (92.7 FM) is a radio station broadcasting a classic hits format. Licensed to St. Simons Island, Georgia, United States, the station serves the Brunswick area. The station is owned by Golden Isles Broadcasting, LLC.

== History ==
The station went on the air as WPFI on December 4, 1989, licensed to St. Simons Island, Georgia. On February 4, 1991, the station changed its call sign to WMOG-FM, on December 8, 1995, to WVVV, on April 5, 1996, to WHFX, on April 4, 2005, to WBGA, on September 8, 2014, to WMOG, and on June 1, 2016, to the current WSSI.

On May 15, 2014, Qantum Communications announced that it would sell its 29 stations, including WBGA, to Clear Channel Communications (now iHeartMedia), in a transaction connected to Clear Channel's sale of WALK AM-FM in Patchogue, New York to Connoisseur Media via Qantum. Clear Channel, in turn, committed to putting WBGA into a divestiture trust (Brunswick Station Trust LLC) to satisfy concentration limits. The transaction was consummated on September 9, 2014.

On September 8, 2014, WBGA changed their format to classic hits, branded as "Big 92.7", under new call letters, WMOG.

On February 19, 2016, iHeartMedia sold WMOG to local competitor, Golden Isles Broadcasting, LLC, for $225,000.

On June 1, 2016, coincident with the consummation of the sale to Golden Isles Broadcasting, WMOG changed its call sign to WSSI, and relaunched the following day as "92.7 SSI".

On March 17, 2021, WSSI was licensed to move its community of license from St. Simons Island to Darien, Georgia. On December 21, 2022, the station was licensed to move back to St. Simons Island.
