= WBGA =

Brunswick, Georgia; United States
- Frequency: 1490 kHz
- Branding: Real 96.3

Programming
- Format: Mainstream urban
- Affiliations: Premiere Networks

Ownership
- Owner: iHeartMedia, Inc.; (iHM Licenses, LLC)
- Sister stations: WGIG, WHFX, WQGA, WYNR

History
- First air date: 1940 (as WMOG)
- Former call signs: WMOG (1940–2014)
- Call sign meaning: W Brunswick, GeorgiA

Technical information
- Licensing authority: FCC
- Facility ID: 36930
- Class: C
- Power: 600 watts unlimited
- Transmitter coordinates: 31°9′42.00″N 81°28′28.00″W
- Translator: 96.3 W242CJ (Brunswick)

Links
- Public license information: Public file; LMS
- Webcast: Listen Live
- Website: real963.iheart.com

WBGA (1490 AM) is a radio station broadcasting a mainstream urban format. Licensed to Brunswick, Georgia, United States, the station serves the Brunswick area. The station is owned by iHeartMedia, Inc., through licensee iHM Licenses, LLC.

== History ==
Previous call sign WMOG was said to be an acronym for "Wonderful Marshes of Glynn". The original station was located on the FJ Torras Causeway, overlooking the Glynn County marshes between Brunswick and St. Simons Island.

Former On Air Personalities: Richard Anderson (1982–1984)

On May 1, 2014, WMOG changed formats from oldies (as "The Beach") to classic hits, rebranded as "Big 96.3".

On May 15, 2014, Qantum Communications announced that it would sell its 29 stations, including WMOG, to Clear Channel Communications (now iHeartMedia), in a transaction connected to Clear Channel's sale of WALK AM-FM in Patchogue, New York to Connoisseur Media via Qantum. The transaction was consummated on September 9, 2014.

On September 8, 2014, WMOG changed their format from oldies to urban adult contemporary, branded as "B96.3 Jamz", under new call letters, WBGA.

On March 14, 2019, WBGA flipped to urban gospel, branded as "Hallelujah 96.3".

On September 21, 2023, at Midnight, after playing "The Promise" by the Mississippi Mass Choir, WBGA flipped to urban contemporary, branded as "Real 96.3"; the first song as "Real" was "Free Mind" by Tems.
