= WYNR =

- Waycross, Georgia; United States
- Broadcast area: South East Georgia & North East Florida
- Frequency: 102.5 MHz
- Branding: WYNR 102.5

Programming
- Format: Country
- Affiliations: Premiere Networks

Ownership
- Owner: iHeartMedia, Inc.; (iHM Licenses, LLC)
- Sister stations: WBGA, WGIG, WHFX, WQGA

History
- Former call signs: WQCW (1983–1986); WAYX-FM (1986–1987); WBGA (1987–2002)

Technical information
- Licensing authority: FCC
- Facility ID: 57785
- Class: C1
- ERP: 97,000 watts
- HAAT: 303 meters (994 ft)
- Transmitter coordinates: 31°9′22.00″N 81°58′19.00″W

Links
- Public license information: Public file; LMS
- Webcast: Listen Live
- Website: 1025wynr.iheart.com

WYNR (102.5 FM) is a radio station broadcasting a country music format. Licensed to Waycross, Georgia, United States, the station serves the Brunswick, Georgia/Jacksonville, Florida area. The station is currently owned by iHeartMedia, Inc., through licensee iHM Licenses, LLC.

== History ==
The station was assigned the call sign WQCW on September 19, 1983. On December 31, 1986, the station changed its call sign to WAYX-FM; on November 1, 1987, to WBGA and on October 8, 2002, to the current WYNR.

On May 15, 2014, Qantum Communications announced that it would sell its 29 stations, including WYNR, to Clear Channel Communications (now iHeartMedia), in a transaction connected to Clear Channel's sale of WALK AM-FM in Patchogue, New York to Connoisseur Media via Qantum. The transaction was consummated on September 9, 2014.

102.5 WYNR is the home station of Glynn Academy Red Terrors Football.
