= 104.3 FM =

FM radio frequency

The following radio stations broadcast on FM frequency 104.3 MHz:

== Argentina ==
- La Hormiga in Rosario, Santa Fe
- Liverpool in Bahía Blanca, Buenos Aires
- LRM424 Platino in Las Rosas, Santa Fe
- LRP759 Ciudad in San Javier, Santa Fe
- LRS341 Red del Plata in Rafaela, Santa Fe

== Australia ==
- ABC Classic in Spencer Gulf, South Australia
- 3MIL in Mildura, Victoria
- 3KKZ in Melbourne, Victoria
- 2EEE in Bega, New South Wales
- Radio National in Wagga Wagga, New South Wales
- Radio TAB in Cairns, Queensland
- SBS Radio in Jindabyne, New South Wales

== Brazil ==
- Expresso FM (ZYS 805) in Fortaleza, Ceará

== Canada (Channel 282) ==
- CBFX-FM-1 in Trois-Rivieres, Quebec
- CBGA-FM-17 in New Richmond, Quebec
- CBMY-FM in Riviere-St-Paul, Quebec
- CBNO-FM in Swift Current, Newfoundland and Labrador
- CBNU-FM in Fermeuse, Newfoundland and Labrador
- CBWZ-FM in Fairford, Manitoba
- CFGP-FM-1 in Peace River, Alberta
- CFGP-FM-2 in Tumbler Ridge, Alberta
- CFRQ-FM in Halifax, Nova Scotia
- CHFA-1-FM in Lethbridge, Alberta
- CHGO-FM in Amos/Val d'Or, Quebec
- CHLG-FM in Vancouver, British Columbia
- CIAM-FM-4 in Foggy Mountain, Alberta
- CICN-FM in Marcelin, Saskatchewan
- CJQM-FM in Sault Sainte Marie, Ontario
- CKNX-1-FM in Wingham, Ontario
- CKQV-FM-1 in Dryden, Ontario
- CKUA-FM-14 in Banff, Alberta
- CKWS-FM in Kingston, Ontario
- CKXR-FM-2 in Enderby, British Columbia

== China ==
- CNR Business Radio in Lhasa
- Shenzhen Media Group Bao'an Radio

== Dominican Republic ==
- HIMH SONIDO HD in Santiago, Dominican Republic

== Indonesia ==
- Radio Silaturahim in Batam & Singapore

== Israel ==
- Kol BaRama

== Jamaica ==
- BBC World Service

== Malaysia ==
- Kool FM in Kuching, Sarawak
- Hot FM in Malacca
- Lite in Kota Bharu, Kelantan

== Mexico ==
- XHATV-FM in Álamo Temapache, Veracruz
- XHAZE-FM in Nogales, Sonora
- XHCHP-FM in Chignahuapan, Puebla
- XHENX-FM in Mazatlán, Sinaloa
- XHERS-FM in Gómez Palacio, Durango
- XHJIM-FM in Ciudad Jiménez, Chihuahua
- XHMCA-FM in Medellín, Veracruz
- XHMK-FM in Huixtla, Chiapas
- XHPUE-FM in Puebla, Puebla
- XHREV-FM in Los Mochis, Sinaloa
- XHROJ-FM in Cancún, Quintana Roo
- XHSV-FM in Morelia, Michoacán
- XHTO-FM in Ciudad Juárez, Chihuahua
- XHTZA-FM in Coatzacoalcos, Veracruz
- XHUDG-FM in Guadalajara, Jalisco
- XHUGPV-FM in Puerto Vallarta, Jalisco
- XHVUN-FM in Villa Unión, Coahuila

== Philippines ==
- DWFT in Metro Manila
- DWMS in Laoag City
- DWAY in Legazpi City
- DYKJ in Cebu City
- DXMA-FM in Davao City
- DXCZ in Zamboanga City

== Turkey ==
- Radyo Trend in Gebze
- TRT Radyo Haber in Mersin and Balıkesir
- TRT FM in Iğdır

== United Kingdom ==
- BBC Radio Devon in Torquay
- BBC Radio Wiltshire in West Wiltshire
- BBC Radio York in Ripon, Thirsk and Northallerton
- BBC Radio Cymru in North East Wales

== United States (Channel 282) ==
- KAJM in Camp Verde, Arizona
- KARH in Fouke, Arkansas
- KAWO in Boise, Idaho
- KBCN-FM in Marshall, Arkansas
- KBEQ in Kansas City, Missouri
- KBIG in Los Angeles, California
- KBQF in McFarland, California
- KBVP in Olney, Texas
- KCAR-FM in Baxter Springs, Kansas
- KCUW-LP in Pendleton, Oregon
- KDBB in Bonne Terre, Missouri
- KEZP in Bunkie, Louisiana
- KFNL-FM in Spring Valley, Minnesota
- KFYN-FM in Detroit, Texas
- KFZE in Daniel, Wyoming
- KGAS in Carthage, Texas
- KHCV in Mecca, California
- KHIP in Gonzales, California
- KHLK in Brownfield, Texas
- KHMR (FM) in Lovelady, Texas
- KHTR in Pullman, Washington
- KIJI in Tumon, Guam
- KIMB in Dix, Nebraska
- KJHB-LP in Jackson, Wyoming
- KJSS-LP in North Little Rock, Arkansas
- KKFN in Longmont, Colorado
- KKMX in Tri City, Oregon
- KKSD in Milbank, South Dakota
- KLKS in Breezy Point, Minnesota
- KLQB in Taylor, Texas
- KMNT in Chehalis, Washington
- KMXY in Grand Junction, Colorado
- KNKP-LP in Imperial, Nebraska
- KPHW in Kaneohe, Hawaii
- KPQG in Goliad, Texas
- KQFX (FM) in Borger, Texas
- KRKN in Eldon, Iowa
- KSHA in Redding, California
- KSOG-LP in Alice, Texas
- KSOP in Salt Lake City, Utah
- KTOO in Juneau, Alaska
- KUFA in Hebronville, Texas
- KVGB-FM in Great Bend, Kansas
- KVMO in Vandalia, Missouri
- KVPH in North Las Vegas, Nevada
- KWOH-LP in Biola, California
- KXOQ in Kennett, Missouri
- KXSE in Davis, California
- KXXU in Santa Anna, Texas
- KZBE in Omak, Washington
- KZBS in Granite, Oklahoma
- KZIO in Two Harbors, Minnesota
- KZLT in East Grand Forks, Minnesota
- KZTP in Sibley, Iowa
- WABK-FM in Gardiner, Maine
- WAJQ in Alma, Georgia
- WAXQ in New York, New York
- WAYI in Charlestown, Indiana
- WAYO-LP in Rochester, New York
- WBBQ in Augusta, Georgia
- WBMX in Chicago, Illinois
- WBQR-LP in Brookfield, Wisconsin
- WCBH in Casey, Illinois
- WCGF-LP in Greer, South Carolina
- WCZY in Mount Pleasant, Michigan
- WEYE in Surgoinsville, Tennessee
- WEZJ in Williamsburg, Kentucky
- WFOX-LP in Sandy Springs, South Carolina
- WFRG in Utica, New York
- WFXK in Bunn, North Carolina
- WFZZ in Seymour, Wisconsin
- WGNL in Greenwood, Mississippi
- WGSX in Lynn Haven, Florida
- WHLW in Luverne, Alabama
- WJKS in Keeseville, New York
- WJSG in Hamlet, North Carolina
- WKCY in Harrisonburg, Virginia
- WKNT-LP in Kingston, Tennessee
- WKZM in Sarasota, Florida
- WLEG-LP in Goshen, Indiana
- WLPL-LP in Dixon, Illinois
- WMJU in Bude, Mississippi
- WNAE in Clarendon, Pennsylvania
- WNLT in Harrison, Ohio
- WNNP in Richwood, Ohio
- WOGI in Moon Township, Pennsylvania
- WOMC in Detroit, Michigan
- WPBP-LP in Brandon, Mississippi
- WPWS-LP in Piney Woods, Mississippi
- WQAM-FM in Miramar, Florida
- WQNQ in Fletcher, North Carolina
- WRDS-LP in Roscommon, Michigan
- WRJJ in La Center, Kentucky
- WRRS-LP in Pittsfield, Massachusetts
- WSKE in Everett, Pennsylvania
- WULL-LP in Ivydale, West Virginia
- WVCN in Baraga, Michigan
- WWPG in Eutaw, Alabama
- WXBC (FM) in Hardinsburg, Kentucky
- WXZC in Inglis, Florida
- WZFT in Baltimore, Maryland
- WZIN in Charlotte Amalie, Virgin Islands
- WZTR in Dahlonega, Georgia
- WZYP in Athens, Alabama
