= WAJQ =

WAJQ may refer to:

- WAJQ-FM, a radio station (104.3 FM) licensed to Alma, Georgia, United States
- WAWO, a radio station (1400 AM) licensed to Alma, Georgia, which held the call sign WAJQ from 1994 to 2011
