= K-car =

K-car may refer to:

- Chrysler K platform, an American automobile platform
  - Plymouth Reliant and Dodge Aries, known as K-cars
- Kawasaki Type K LRV, a light rail vehicle built by Kawasaki in 1981 for use on SEPTA trolley lines
- HR 4138, a star in the constellation Carina with Bayer designation K Carinae, abbreviated K Car
- Toyota K platform, Japanese automobile platform
- "K Car", a song by Relient K from the 2000 album Relient K
- K-car, nickname of a helicopter in the Rhodesian Fireforce configuration

== See also ==
- KCAR (disambiguation)
- Chevrolet C/K, a series of trucks 1962–1998
- Kei car, a Japanese category of small automobiles
