= KJOI =

KJOI may refer to:

- KJOI-LD, a low-power television station (channel 32) licensed to serve Bakersfield, California, United States; see List of television stations in California
- KWOH-LP, a low-power radio station (104.3 FM) licensed to serve Biola, California, which held the call sign KJOI-LP from 2015 to 2023
- KJOU-LD, a low-power television station (channel 12) licensed to serve Bakersfield, California, which held the call sign KJOI-LP from 2005 to 2015
- KFXR (AM), a radio station (1190 AM) licensed to serve Dallas, Texas, United States, which held the call sign KJOI from 2000 to 2001
- KCBT-LD, a low-power television station (channel 34) licensed to serve Bakersfield, California, which held the call sign KJOI-LP from 1998 to 2005
- KSOF, a radio station (98.9 FM) licensed to serve Dinuba, California, which held the call sign KJOI from 1990 to 1997
- KYSR, a radio station (98.7 FM) licensed to serve Los Angeles, California, which held the call sign KJOI from 1972 to 1990
