= WXBC =

WXBC may refer to

- WXBC Bard College Radio a student-run radio station in Annandale-on-Hudson, New York.
- WXBC (FM) a radio station in Hardinsburg, Kentucky.
