= KHMR =

KHMR or Khmr may refer to:

- KHMR (FM), a radio station (104.3 FM) licensed to serve Lovelady, Texas, United States
- Kicking Horse Resort
- Khmer script (ISO 15924 code: Khmr)
