= Expresso FM =

Expresso FM (ZYS 805)
Guaiúba, Ceará; Brazil
- Broadcast area: Fortaleza, Ceará
- Frequency: 104.3 MHz

Programming
- Language: Portuguese
- Format: Music; Sports

Ownership
- Owner: Sistema Liberdade de Comunicação Ltda.
- Operator: Sistema Ceará Agora de Comunicação
- Sister stations: Mix FM Fortaleza

History
- Founded: March 2010
- Former names: Expresso SomZoom Sat

Technical information
- Licensing authority: ANATEL
- Class: A1
- ERP: 7.1 kW

Links
- Public license information: Profile
- Website: cearaagora.com.br/expresso-fm/

Expresso FM (ZYS 805) is a Brazilian radio station based in Fortaleza, Ceará, and licensed to Guaiúba. It is part of the pool of enterprises named Sistema Ceará Agora de Comunicação. The station is a music radio station with a regional format, combining sports programming and a daily newscast.

== History ==
Expresso FM appeared on the Fortaleza dial on March 8, 2010, on an experimental basis on 90.7 MHz, a frequency licensed to Maracanaú, replacing Rede SomZoom Sat, which had been broadcasting on this dial since 2007. Betting on the popular segment and hiring important communicators, the station was officially launched at the end of the year. Expresso FM was a project initially founded and supported by the Sindicato das Empresas de Ônibus do Estado do Ceará (Sindiônibus) with a focus on the capital's bus lines, mixing popular programming with journalism.

In February 2014, the entity that owns 90.7 MHz entered into a partnership with Rede Vida Sat, a religious network based in São Paulo, to launch an affiliate on the frequency in place of Expresso FM. Initially scheduled for March 1, the premiere was postponed until April, giving Expresso FM time to set up its broadcast on another frequency. The station entered into a partnership with Rede SomZoom Sat, which had been broadcasting since 2013 on 104.3 MHz, a station licensed to Guaiúba. Beginning on March 31, 2014, the partnership between the two resulted in the creation of Expresso SomZoom Sat, a fusion of the two stations' programming. The affiliate of the Feliz FM network - Rede Vida Sat's new name - was launched on 90.7 MHz on April 6. In the same year, the station estimated that its average audience with the partnership was 270,000 listeners per minute on Fortaleza's public transport alone.

Expresso SomZoom Sat operated until December 31, 2016, when the partnership with SomZoom Sat was terminated and on January 1, 2017, it became an independent broadcaster again. The official re-launch of Expresso FM programming took place on January 2. The station kept programs from the old Expresso SomZoom Sat, such as Expresso da Manhã (present since the radio station's debut), Expresso em Pauta and Alto Astral, and announced the hiring of broadcaster Rasga Baleia, the team from the program Canal do Vovô (both from radio 91 FM, the latter was named Equipe Bola na Rede), and announced its sports team, led by Bosco Farias (from Rádio Verdes Mares), as well as keeping communicators such as Lobão, Fran Silveira and Karine Mitre. The sports team officially debuted on January 9, 2017. Also from 91 FM, broadcaster Camila Carla made her debut on the station on January 23.

In December 2017, Expresso FM signed an agreement with TV da Gente for the "A Expresso é da Gente" project, aimed at promoting the station's new programming, which also began rebroadcasting Expresso FM programs. The partnership began with the definitive installation of TV da Gente in Fortaleza, which opened on January 1, 2019. The agreement lasted until the beginning of the COVID-19 pandemic, when programming was initially suspended for safety reasons and was never resumed.

In January 2023, Expresso FM ended its management partnership with Sindiônibus and began restructuring its team and voice-over professionals, including moving its headquarters from the union building to the headquarters of Sistema Ceará Agora de Comunicação (which owns the frequency and is responsible for managing the project) in the Aldeota neighborhood. In October 2024, Expresso FM hired sports narrator Gomes Farias (Bosco Farias' uncle) from Jovem Pan News Fortaleza to lead the Apaixonados por Futebol team and present a daily sports program. In December 2024, the conglomerate launched Expresso FM Sobral to replace the Mix FM affiliate in the municipality.

== Bibliography ==
- Canalito, Jorge; Leme, Paulinho (2007). Rádio FM: Em Fortaleza é outra história. Fortaleza, Ceará: Premius Editora. ISBN 9788590732907.
