= KCAR =

KCAR may refer to:

- KCAR-FM, a radio station (104.3 FM) licensed to serve Galena, Kansas, United States
- KHDY (AM), a radio station (1350 AM) licensed to serve Clarksville, Texas, United States, which held the call sign KCAR until 2018
- Caribou Municipal Airport, ICAO airport code KCAR
- King Cetshwayo Artillery Regiment, an artillery regiment of the South African Army

== See also ==
- K-Car
