= WWIO =

WWIO may refer to:

- WWIO-FM, a radio station (88.9 FM) licensed to Brunswick, Georgia, United States
- WPAA (AM), a radio station (1190 AM) licensed to St. Marys, Georgia, United States, which held the call sign WWIO from 2002 to 2025
