= WAYO (disambiguation) =

WAYO is a radio station in Rochester, New York.

Wayo or WAYO may also refer to:

- Wayō, a Japanese architectural and artistic style
- Wayo (song), a song by Tekno
- WCXB, a radio station (89.9 FM) licensed to Benton Harbor, Michigan, United States, which held the call sign WAYO from 2007 to 2013
