= WPAA (AM) =

- St. Marys, Georgia; United States
- Broadcast area: Brunswick, Georgia; Jacksonville, Florida
- Frequency: 1190 kHz

Programming
- Language: English
- Format: Classic country

Ownership
- Owner: Blueberry Broadcasting, Inc.; (Blueberry Broadcasting, Inc.)
- Sister stations: WAJQ-FM

History
- First air date: 1985
- Former call signs: WECC (1985–2002); WWIO (2002–2025)

Technical information
- Licensing authority: FCC
- Facility ID: 38286
- Class: D
- Power: 1,800 watts (day only)
- Transmitter coordinates: 30°45′47″N 81°36′39″W
- Translator: 94.3 W232DA (St. Marys)

Links
- Public license information: Public file; LMS

WPAA (1190 AM) is a classic country station licensed to serve St. Marys, Georgia, United States. The station is owned by Blueberry Broadcasting Corporation, which also owns WAJQ-FM and WAWO in Alma, Georgia. It broadcasts a classic country format with songs from the 1970s-early 2000s.

== History ==
The station was assigned the call sign WWIO by the Federal Communications Commission (FCC) on April 19, 2002.

The call sign was changed to WPAA on January 20, 2025, ahead of a $30,000 sale to Neal Ardman's NIA Broadcasting. Ardman, through Radio Kings Bay, already owns WKBX in the area.
