= XHAZE-FM =

Radio station in Nogales, Sonora, Mexico

- Nogales, Sonora; Mexico
- Broadcast area: Nogales, Sonora
- Frequency: 104.3 MHz
- Branding: Urbana 104.3

Programming
- Format: Spanish rhythmic

Ownership
- Owner: Comercial Libertas, S.A. de C.V.

History
- First air date: November 14, 1997
- Call sign meaning: Arizpe

Technical information
- Licensing authority: CRT
- Class: B
- ERP: 50 kW
- HAAT: 73.9 m (242 ft)
- Transmitter coordinates: 31°16′33″N 110°55′32.8″W

Links
- Website: www.urbananogales.com

XHAZE-FM is a radio station on 104.3 FM in Nogales, Sonora. The station is known as Urbana 104.3 and carries a Spanish rhythmic format.

== History ==
XHAZE received its concession on October 5, 1994. It was originally located in Arizpe, but the station was relocated to Nogales, 81 miles (130 km) away, before signing on November 14, 1997.

After years of broadcasting a Regional Mexican format under "La Sonora de Nogales", XHAZE-FM flipped to Spanish rhythmic as "Urbana 104.3" on September 5, 2023.
