= XHROJ-FM =

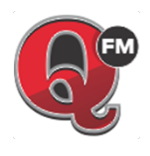
- Cancún, Quintana Roo; Mexico
- Broadcast area: Cancún, Quintana Roo
- Frequency: 104.3 FM
- Branding: QFM

Programming
- Format: Vaiety hits
- Affiliations: El Heraldo Radio

Ownership
- Owner: Grupo Quequi; (Fundación Maya Cancún, A.C.)

History
- First air date: February 25, 2010 (permit); May 24, 2011
- Call sign meaning: Sergio ROJano Sahab

Technical information
- Licensing authority: CRT
- Class: A
- ERP: 2.844 kW
- HAAT: 44.60 m

Links
- Webcast: QFM Listen Live

XHROJ-FM is a noncommercial radio station on 104.3 FM in Cancún, Quintana Roo, Mexico. It is known as QFM 104.3.

== History ==
XHFMC-FM received its permit in 2010. The callsign was changed to XHROJ-FM not long after, likely named after Sergio Rojano Sahab, who was listed as the lawyer on the application to change the callsign but has been described as ripping off radio station owners. From its sign-on on May 24, 2011, to 2012, XHROJ was known as Yaakun FM, with an adult contemporary music format. The station took its name from the Mayan word for "caring".

=== First Quequi era ===
On January 7, 2013, XHROJ relaunched under the ownership of Corporativo Quequi, a newspaper publisher in the state, at an event headlined by Governor Roberto Borge Angulo.

=== Acustik management ===
Logo used while operated by Acustik between 2016 and 2018

In early 2016, operation transferred from Quequi to a new media group, Grupo Acustik (or Acustik Media). While QFM retained its English classic hits format, Acustik relocated its operations to the Plaza Península and also launched a commercial pirate station, Acustik 95.3. Acustik also began a process of national expansion, winning 32 radio stations in the IFT-4 auction of 2017 In early 2018, programming on QFM included Acustik Noticias Quintana Roo newscasts and a handful of special interest programs.

=== Return to Quequi ===
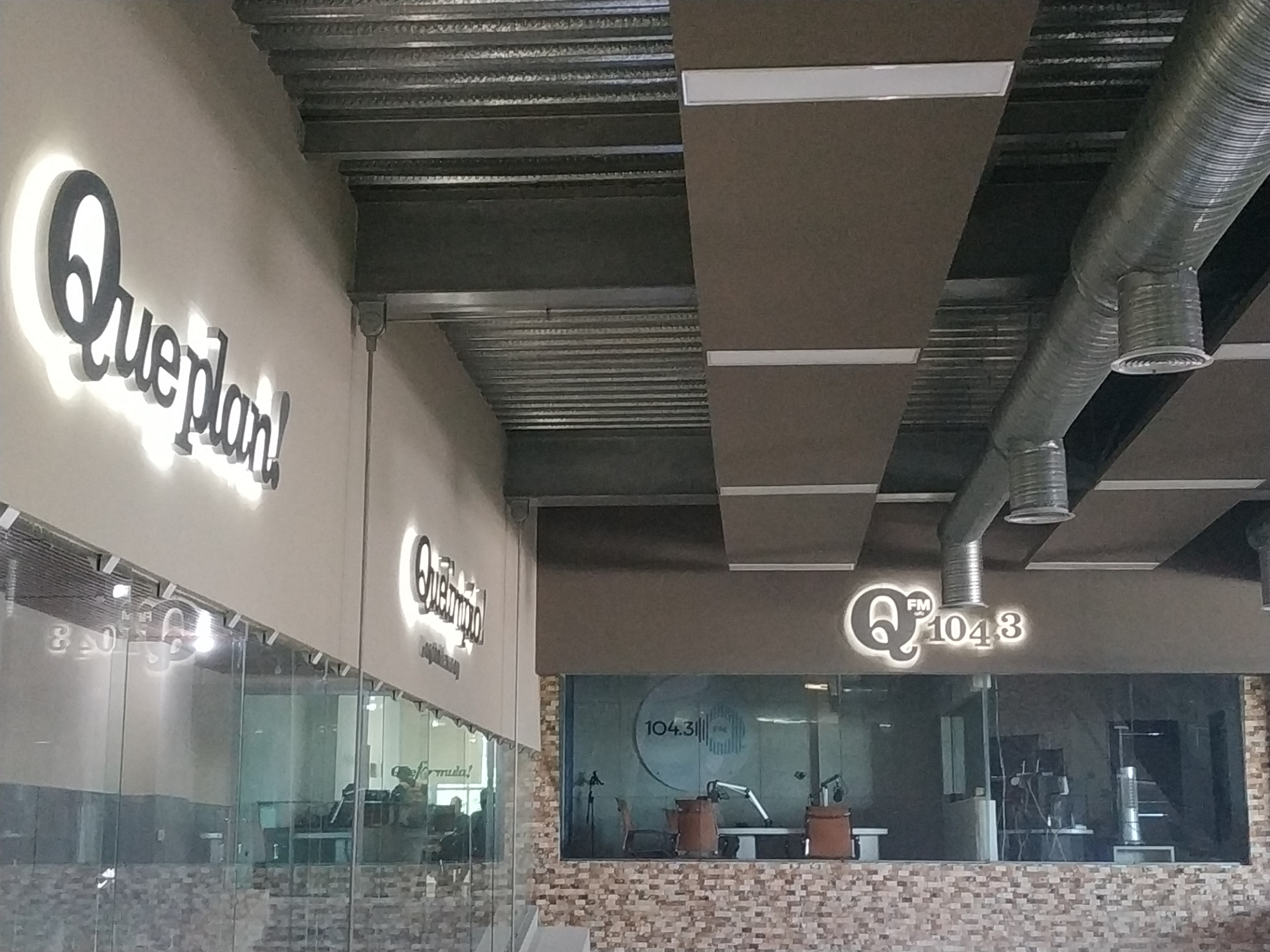
The QFM studios inside the Grupo Quequi headquarters in Cancún

In August 2018, Grupo Quequi retook control of QFM, reinstating its own news programming including a revival of the Qué Pasa en Quintana Roo newscast. QFM began airing El Heraldo Radio programming on June 1, 2020.
