= XHATV-FM =

Radio station in Álamo Temapache, Veracruz, Mexico

Álamo-Temapache, Veracruz; Mexico
- Frequency: 104.3 FM
- Branding: Unción FM

Programming
- Format: Christian radio

Ownership
- Owner: Ageo Hernández Hernández

History
- First air date: July 5, 2018
- Call sign meaning: Álamo Temapache Veracruz

Technical information
- Class: A
- ERP: 2.252 kWs
- HAAT: -1.9 m
- Transmitter coordinates: 20°54′55″N 97°40′28″W

Links
- Webcast: Listen live
- Website: radiofm1043.com

XHATV-FM is a radio station on 104.3 FM in Álamo-Temapache, Veracruz, Mexico. XHATV-FM is owned by Ageo Hernández Hernández and carries a Christian talk format known as "Unción FM".

== History ==
XHATV-FM received its concession on March 8, 2018, and the station signed on July 5, 2018. It had previously broadcast as a pirate on 104.7.
