= XHJIM-FM =

Radio station in Ciudad Jiménez, Chihuahua

- Ciudad Jiménez, Chihuahua; Mexico
- Broadcast area: Ciudad Jiménez, Chihuahua
- Frequency: 104.3 FM
- Branding: Halcón Stereo

Programming
- Format: Pop

Ownership
- Owner: Sergio Villarreal Lujan

History
- First air date: September 23, 1992 (concession)
- Call sign meaning: JIMénez

Technical information
- Licensing authority: CRT
- Class: B
- ERP: 50.07 kW
- HAAT: 41.6 m (136 ft)

Links
- Website: www.jimenezvivo.com/web/

XHJIM-FM is a radio station on 104.3 FM in Ciudad Jiménez, Chihuahua. The station is owned by Sergio Villarreal Lujan and carries a pop format known as Halcón Stereo.

== History ==
XHJIM received its concession on September 23, 1992.
