= KBCN-FM =

- Marshall, Arkansas; United States
- Broadcast area: North Arkansas
- Frequency: 104.3 MHz
- Branding: ESPN Arkansas

Programming
- Language: English
- Format: Sports radio
- Network: ESPN Radio

Ownership
- Owner: Pearson Broadcasting of Marshall, Inc.

History
- First air date: April 1983
- Former call signs: KZRO (1983–1988); KSNE (1988–1993)

Technical information
- Licensing authority: FCC
- Facility ID: 14064
- Class: C0
- ERP: 100,000 watts
- HAAT: 310 meters (1,020 ft)
- Transmitter coordinates: 35°52′17″N 92°39′10″W

Links
- Public license information: Public file; LMS
- Webcast: Listen live
- Website: hitthatline.com

KBCN-FM (104.3 MHz, "ESPN Arkansas") is a FM radio station broadcasting a sports radio format. Licensed to Marshall, Arkansas, United States, the station is currently owned by Pearson Broadcasting of Marshall, Inc.

== History ==
The Federal Communications Commission issued a construction permit for the station in April 1983. The station was assigned call sign KZRO in April 1983, and received its license to cover on January 17, 1984. On October 15, 1988, the station changed its call sign to KSNE and again on July 1, 1993 to KBCN-FM.

On March 1, 2012, KBCN-FM changed their format from country to sports, branded as "ESPN Arkansas" with programming from ESPN Radio.
