= Guaiúba =

Municipality in Ceará, Brazil

- Municipality
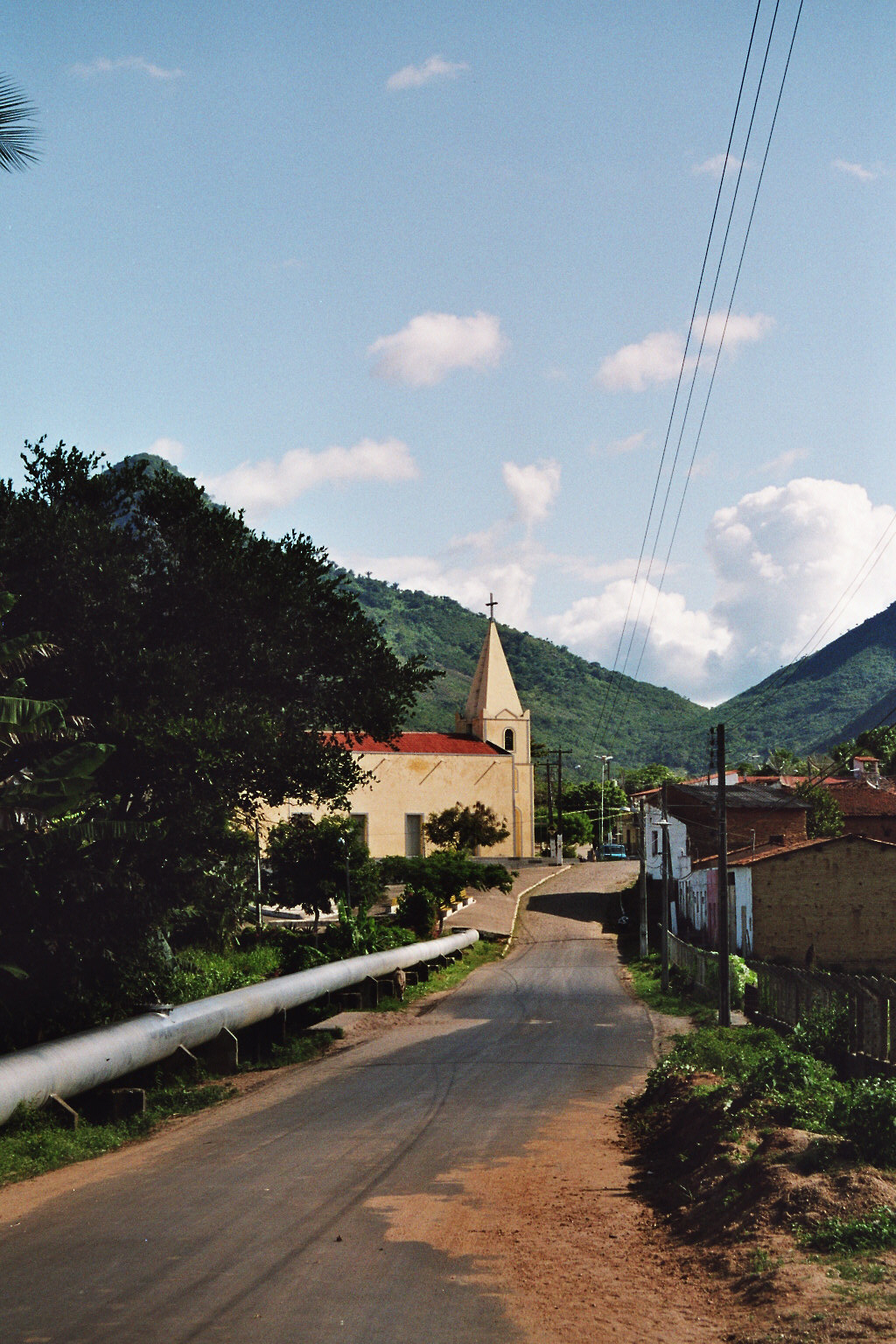

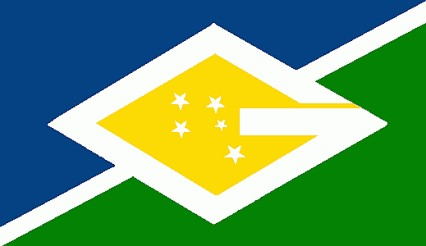
- Flag Coat of arms

- Coordinates: 4°02′S 38°38′W
- Country: Brazil
- Region: Nordeste
- State: Ceará
- Mesoregion: Metropolitana de Fortaleza

Population (2020)
  - Total: 26,290
- Time zone: UTC−3 (BRT)

Guaiúba is a municipality in the state of Ceará in the Northeast region of Brazil.

== See also ==
- List of municipalities in Ceará
