= WRDS-LP =

- Roscommon, Michigan; United States
- Frequency: 104.3 MHz

Programming
- Format: Southern gospel

Ownership
- Owner: Soul's Harbor Assembly of God Church

Technical information
- Licensing authority: FCC
- Facility ID: 126011
- Class: L1
- ERP: 100 watts
- HAAT: 16.6 meters (54 ft)
- Transmitter coordinates: 44°29′36.1″N 84°35′45.4″W

Links
- Public license information: LMS

WRDS-LP (104.3 FM) is a southern gospel radio station licensed to Roscommon, Michigan, United States. The station is currently owned by Soul's Harbor Assembly of God Church.
