= WRJJ =

- La Center, Kentucky; United States
- Frequency: 104.3 MHz
- Branding: 104.3 WRJJ

Programming
- Format: 80's hits

Ownership
- Owner: Janet Jensen

History
- First air date: 2012

Technical information
- Licensing authority: FCC
- Facility ID: 164199
- Class: A
- ERP: 4,000 watts
- HAAT: 38 metres (125 ft)
- Transmitter coordinates: 37°04′30″N 88°58′22″W

Links
- Public license information: Public file; LMS

WRJJ (104.3 FM) is a radio station licensed to serve the community of La Center, Kentucky. The station is owned by Janet Jensen, and airs an 80's hits format.

The station was assigned the WRJJ call letters by the Federal Communications Commission on October 7, 2008.
