= CICN-FM =

Defunct
- Marcelin, Saskatchewan; Canada
- Broadcast area: Muskeg Lake Cree Nation
- Frequency: 104.3 MHz

Programming
- Format: First Nations community radio

Ownership
- Owner: Muskeg Lake Cree Nation

History
- First air date: November 1, 2011
- Last air date: June 2017

Technical information
- ERP: 30 watts
- HAAT: 12.1 metres (40 ft)
- Transmitter coordinates: 53°00′15″N 106°52′36″W

CICN-FM was a radio station broadcasting First Nations community radio programming on the frequency 104.3 MHz (FM) on the Muskeg Lake Cree Nation at Marcelin, Saskatchewan, Canada.

== History ==
On June 22, 2011, Muskeg Lake Cree Nation Radio Station Corporation received Canadian Radio-television and Telecommunications Commission (CRTC) approval to operate a new English- and Cree-language low-power Type B Native FM radio station at Muskeg Lake Cree Nation, Saskatchewan. The station signed on the air on November 1, 2011 and ceased broadcasting in June 2017.
