= XHSV-FM =

Radio station in Morelia, Michoacán

Morelia, Michoacán, Mexico; Mexico
- Frequency: 104.3 MHz
- Branding: Radio Nicolaita

Programming
- Format: Mexican college

Ownership
- Owner: Universidad Michoacana de San Nicolás de Hidalgo

History
- First air date: 1975

Technical information
- ERP: 25 kW
- HAAT: -75.51 meters
- Transmitter coordinates: 19°38′48.1″N 101°13′24.7″W

Links
- Webcast: radionicolaita.umich.mx/index.php/radio-en-vivo
- Website: radionicolaita.umich.mx

XHSV-FM is a Mexican college radio station owned by the Universidad Michoacana de San Nicolás de Hidalgo. It is known as Radio Nicolaita and broadcasts on 104.3 MHz in Morelia.

== History ==
XHSV began as XESV-AM 1370, obtaining its permit on February 12, 1974. Installation work began in 1975 for the new station.

The station migrated to FM in 2011 as XHSV-FM 104.3.
