= WZTR =

Radio station in Dahlonega, Georgia

- Dahlonega, Georgia; United States
- Broadcast area: Northeast Georgia
- Frequency: 104.3 MHz
- Branding: GNN Radio

Programming
- Format: Christian

Ownership
- Owner: Augusta Radio Fellowship Institute, Inc.

History
- First air date: 1996 (as WKHC)
- Former call signs: WKHC (1996–2008)

Technical information
- Licensing authority: FCC
- Facility ID: 34319
- Class: A
- ERP: 3,700 watts
- HAAT: 127 meters (417 ft)
- Transmitter coordinates: 34°29′56.00″N 84°8′32.00″W

Links
- Public license information: Public file; LMS
- Website: gnnradio.org

WZTR (104.3 FM) is a radio station broadcasting a Christian format, licensed to Dahlonega, Georgia, United States. The station is currently owned by Augusta Radio Fellowship Institute, Inc.

Turner purchased the radio station in 2006, then operating as WKHC-FM ("Gold 104.3") carrying ABC's satellite "Real Country" format. In 2008, the station changed its moniker to "Thunder 104.3 FM" and changed its format from classic country to a mix of classic rock, southern rock and country music.
