= Toyota K platform =

Motor vehicle body platform

The Toyota K platform, informally known as the Toyota Camry platform, is a front-wheel-drive automobile platform (also adaptable to four-wheel-drive) that has underpinned various Toyota and Lexus models from the mid-size category upwards since September 1999, starting with the Avalon (XX20). Besides the Camry, the K platform was used on minivans, crossovers and luxury sedans. This platform was larger than the front-wheel-drive MC and New MC platforms, but less upscale than the N and New N platforms designed for rear-wheel drive luxury applications. Starting with the XV70 Toyota Camry (2017), the new K platform (TNGA-K) is part of the Toyota New Global Architecture (TNGA).

== Features ==
- It is a front-wheel drive platform, with optional four-wheel drive.
- Four-wheel drive variants use either:
  - V-Flex II system, which is a viscous-coupling torque-on-demand unit (on most models); or
  - Symmetric full-time four-wheel drive (on Lexus RX and Highlander)
  - e-FOUR system (rear wheels are driven by electric motors) on hybrid models.
- Engines are mounted transversely.
- MacPherson struts are used in suspension at all four corners with the exception of the Alphard, Previa, and Sienna, which use a twist-beam rear suspension.

== Applications ==
- Toyota Avalon — XX20 (1999–2004), XX10 (2000–2005, for Australian market), XX30 (2004–2012), XX40 (2012–2018)
  - Toyota Pronard — XX20 (2000–2004)
  - Toyota X Runner — XX10 (concept car, 2003)
- Toyota Camry — XV30 (2001–2006), XV40 (2006–2011), XV50 (2011–2017)
  - Toyota Camry Solara — XV30 (2003–2009)
  - Toyota Aurion — XV40 (2006–2011), XV50 (2011–2017)
- Toyota Highlander/Kluger — XU20 (2000–2007), XU40 (2007–2013), XU50 (2013–2019)
- Toyota Previa/Estima/Tarago — XR30, XR40 (2000–2005)
- Toyota Alphard — AH10 (2002–2008)
- Toyota Sienna — XL20 (2003–2009), XL30 (2010–2020)
- Toyota Venza — AV10 (2008–2017)
- Lexus ES — XV30 (2001–2006), XV40 (2006–2012), XV60 (2012–2018)
  - Toyota Windom — XV30 (2001–2006)
- Lexus RX — XU30 (2003–2008), AL10 (2008–2015), AL20 (2015–2022)
  - Toyota Harrier — XU30 (2003–2013)
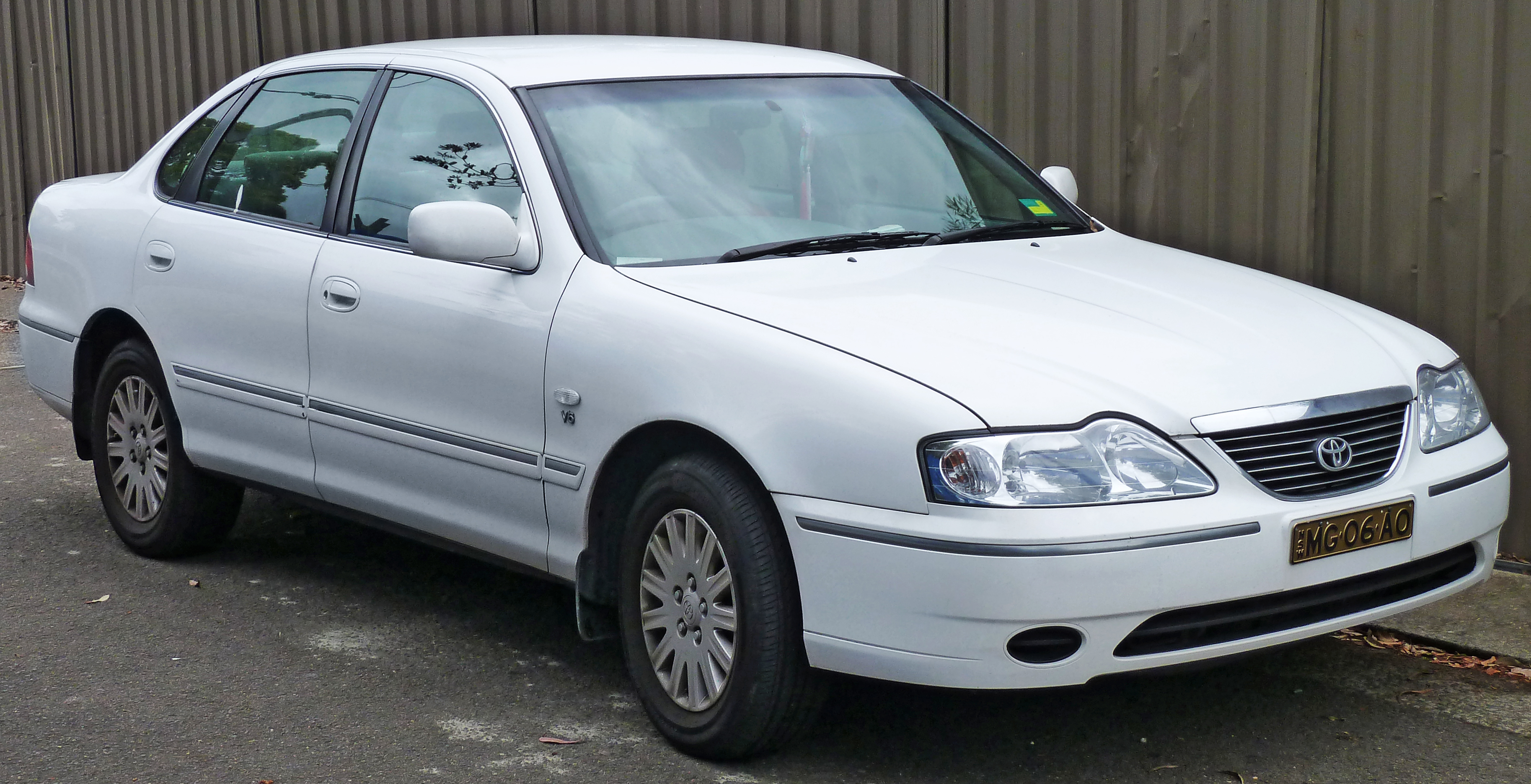
Toyota Avalon (XX10, for Australian market)

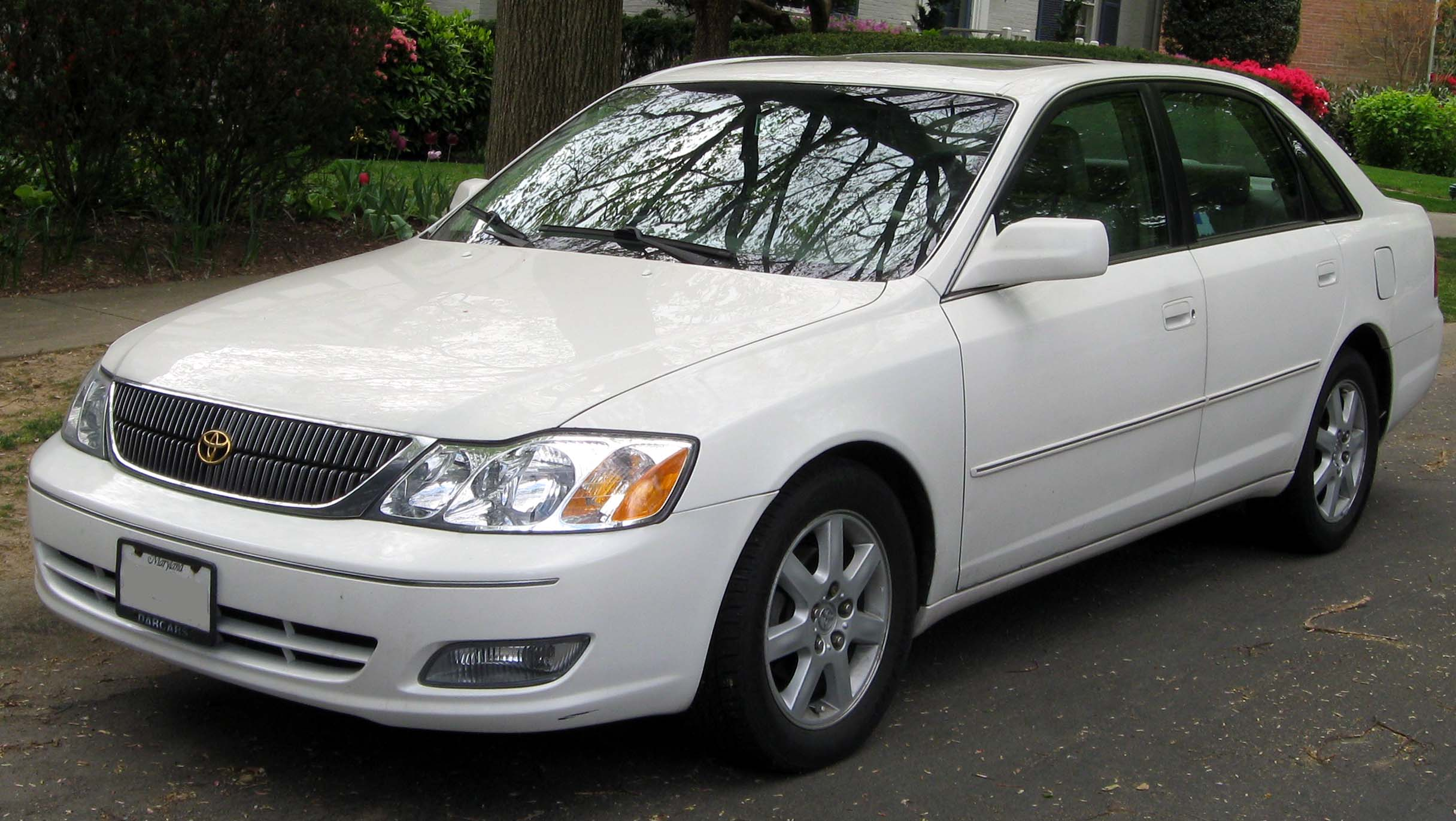
Toyota Avalon/Pronard (XX20)

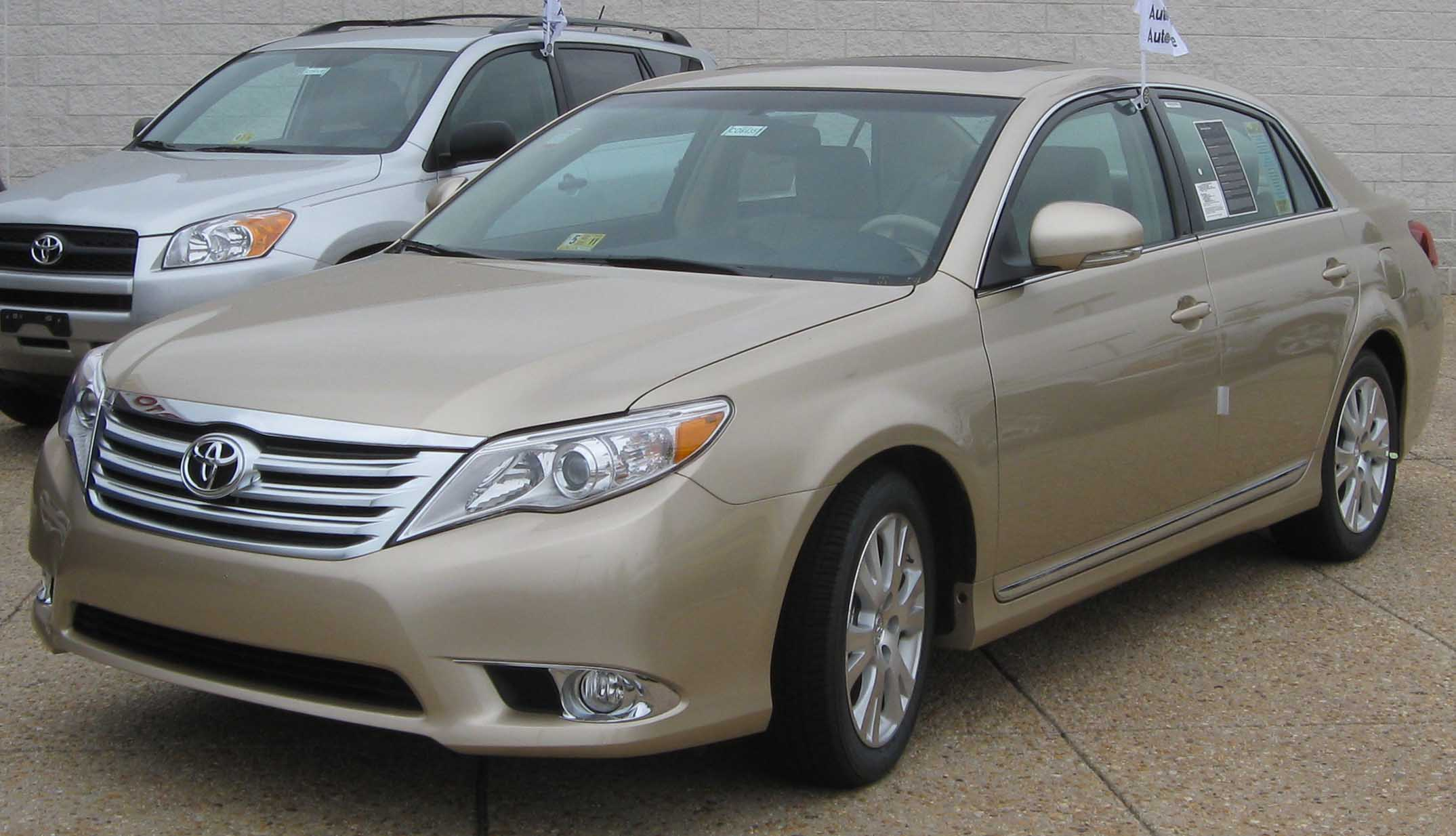
Toyota Avalon (XX30)

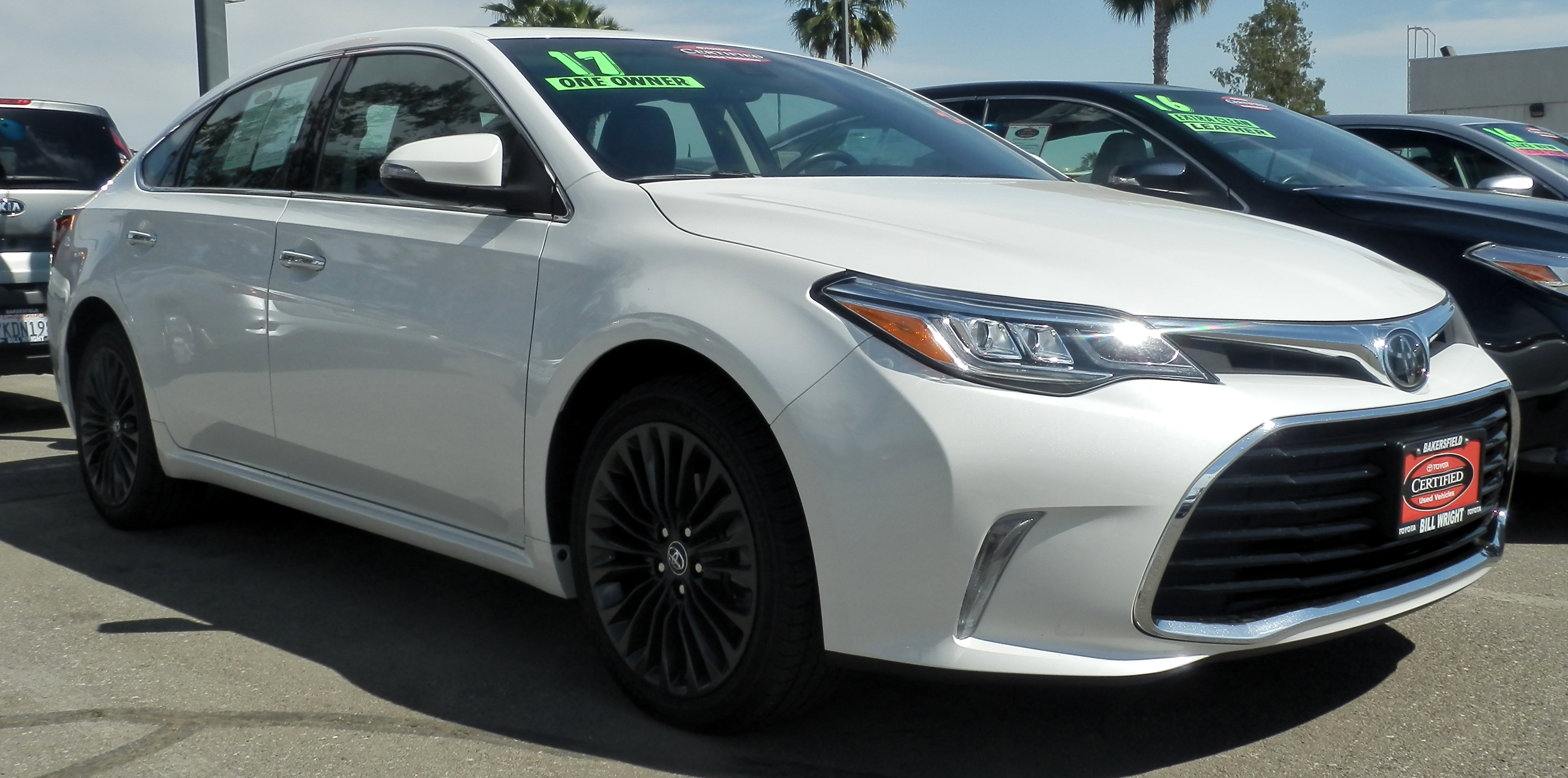
Toyota Avalon (XX40)

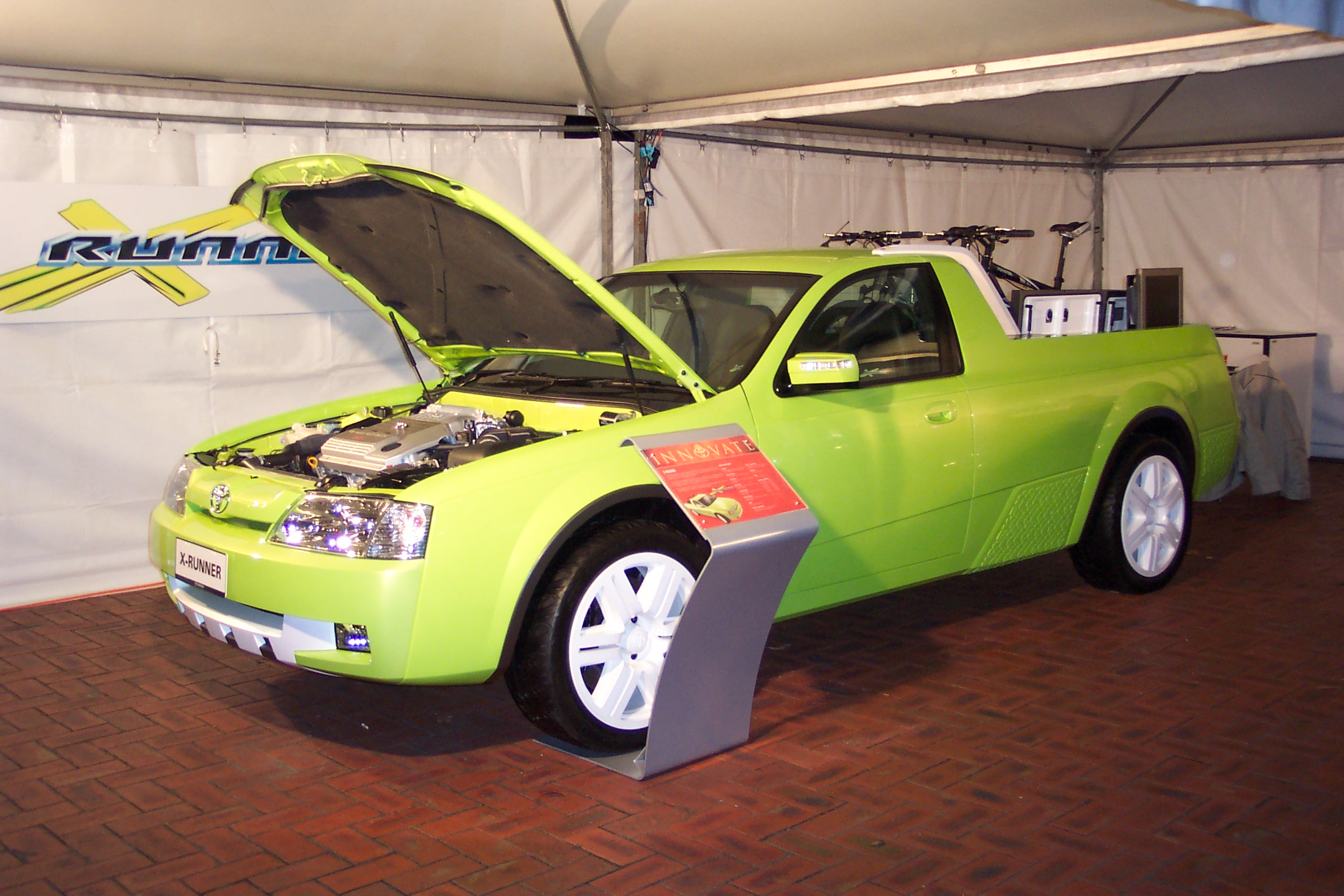
Toyota X Runner

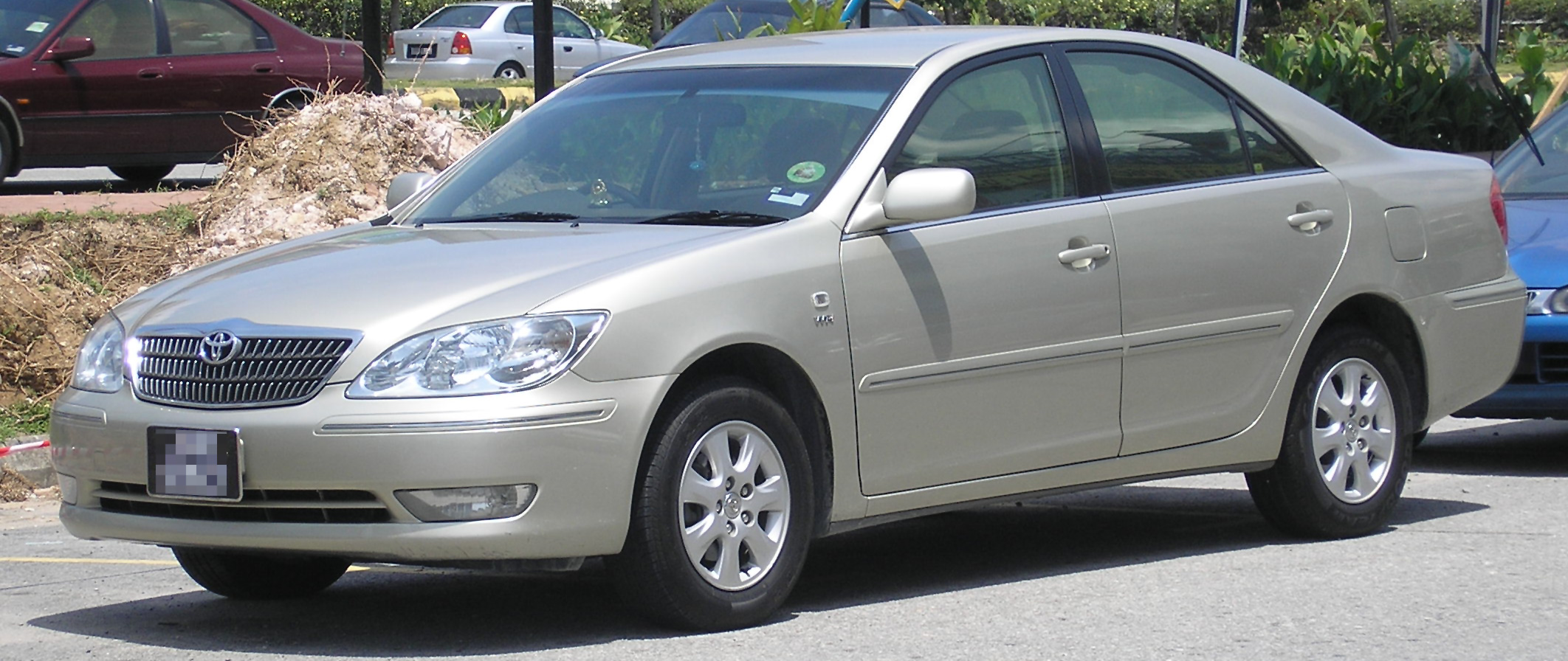
Toyota Camry (XV30)

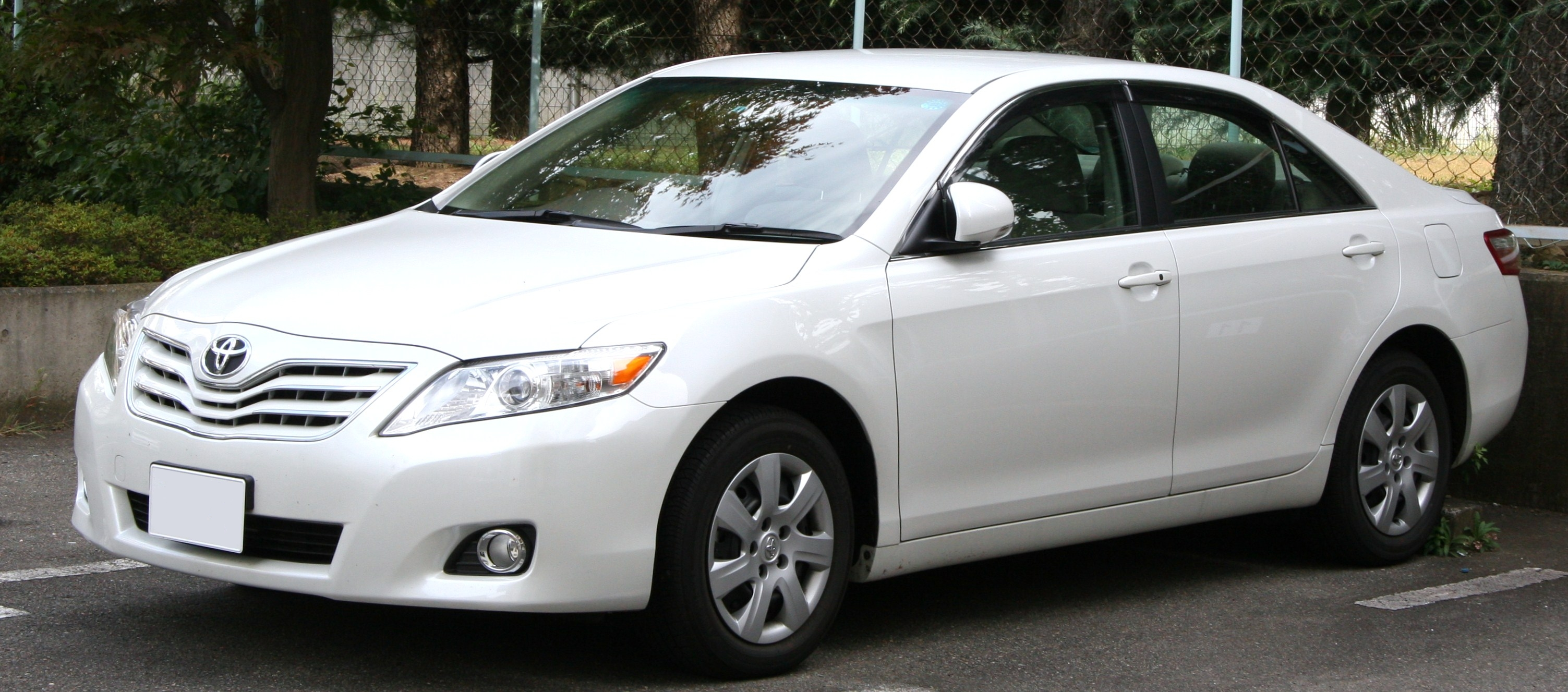
Toyota Camry (XV40)

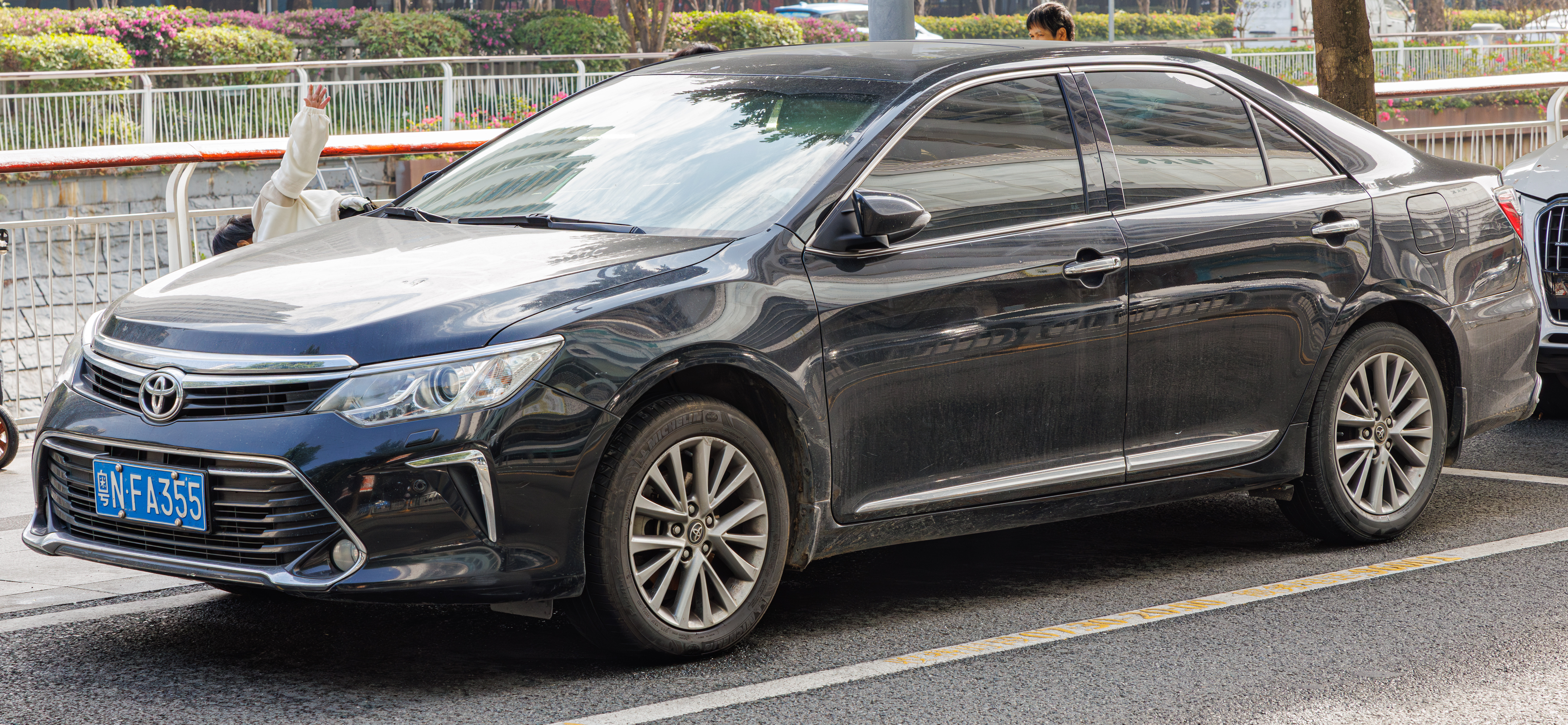
Toyota Camry/Aurion (XV50)

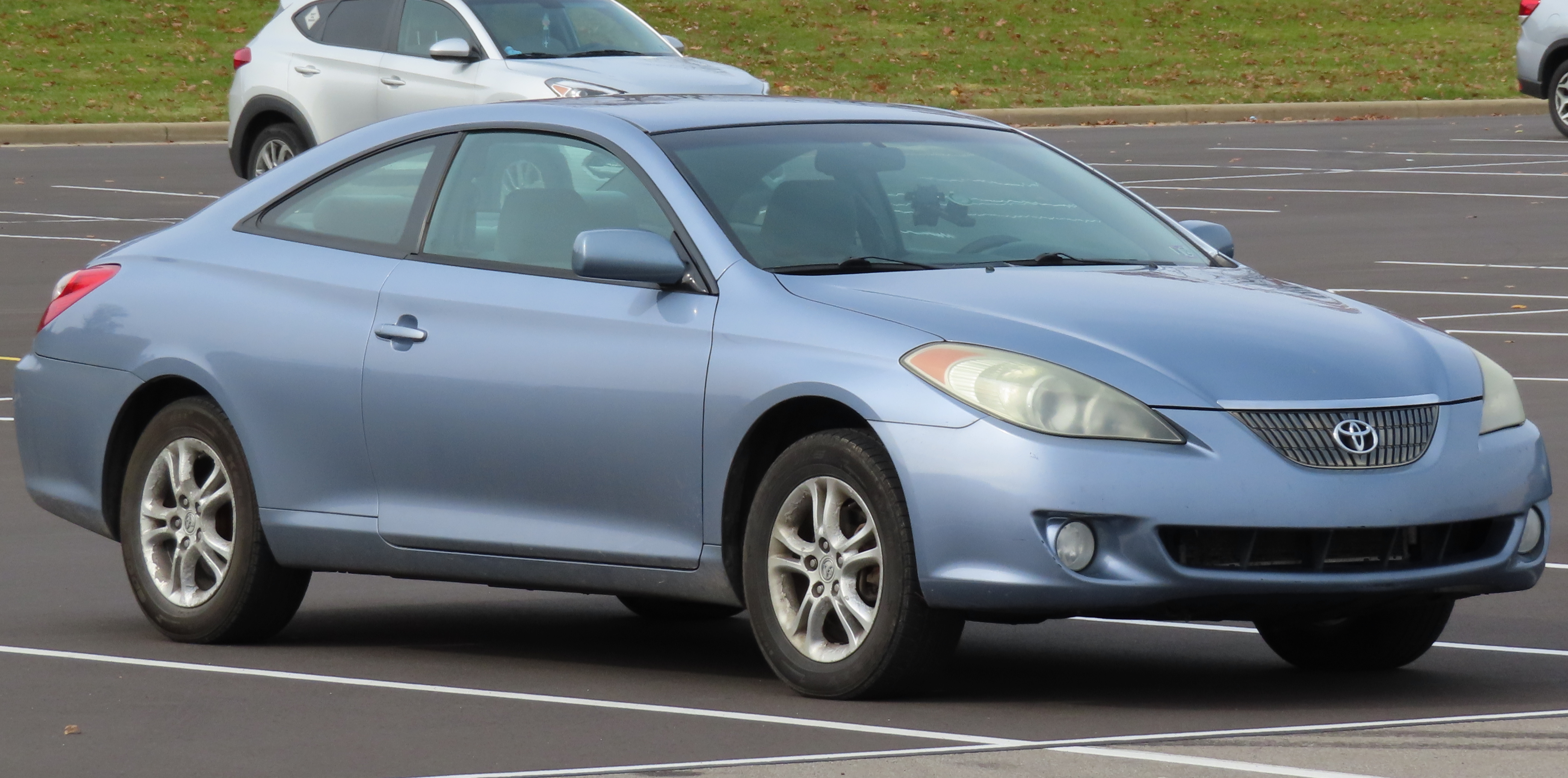
Toyota Camry Solara

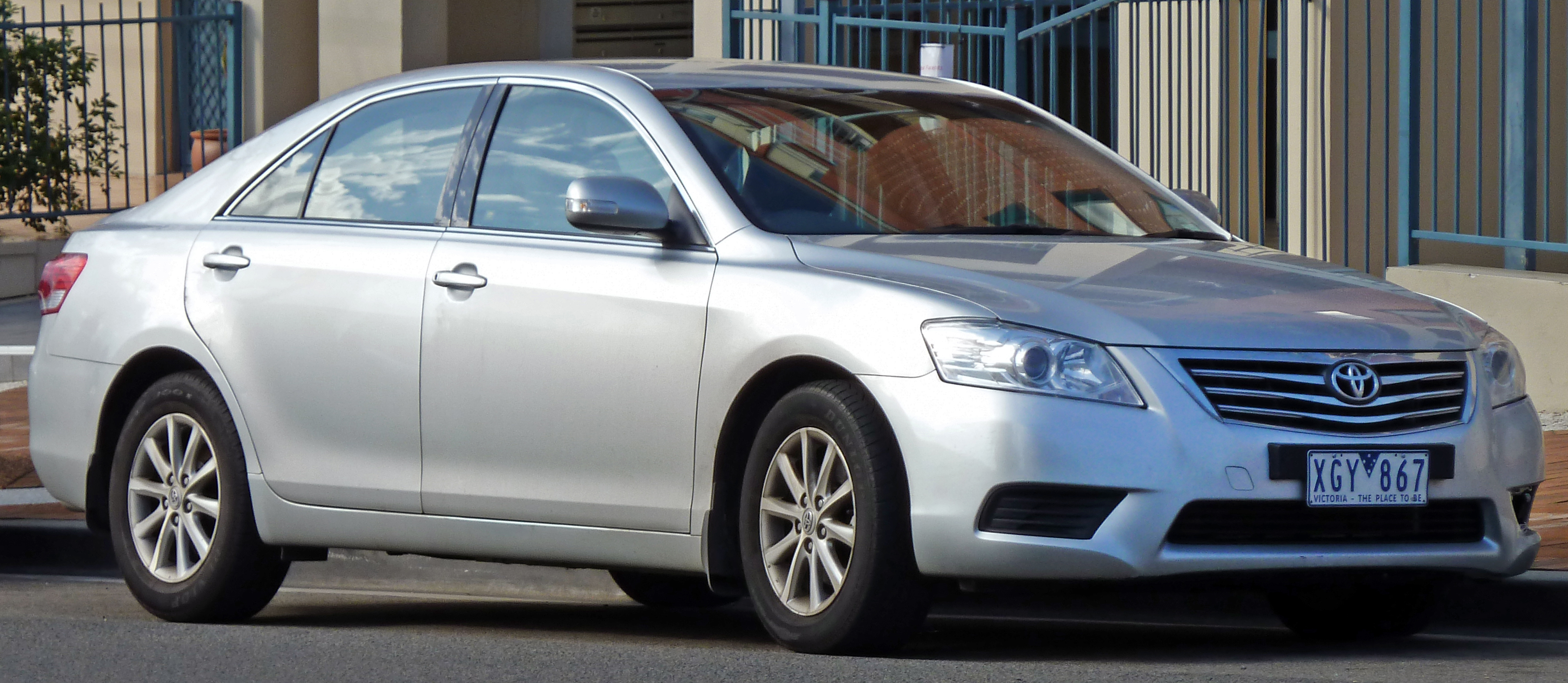
Toyota Aurion/Camry (XV40)

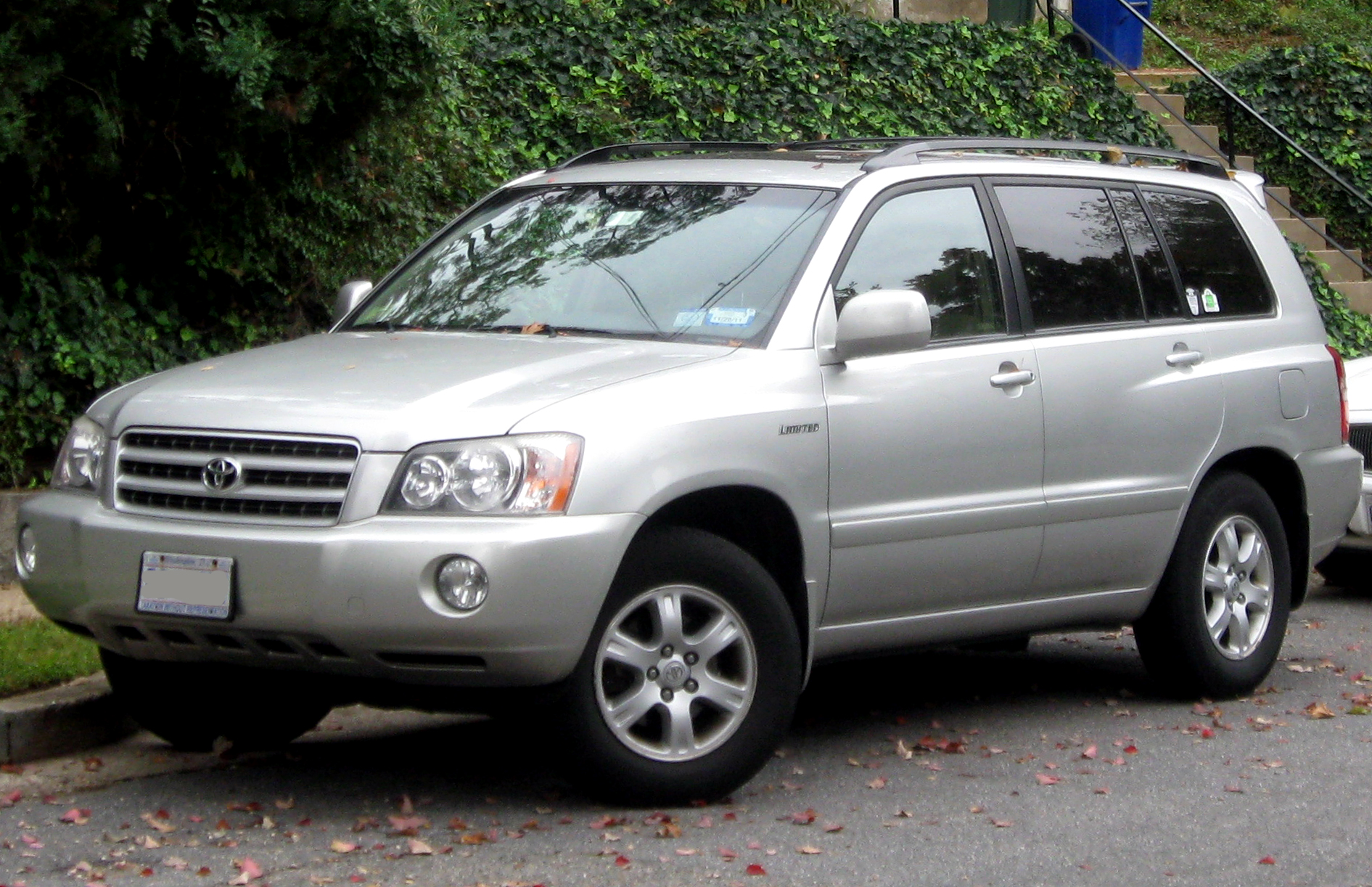
Toyota Highlander/Kluger (XU20)

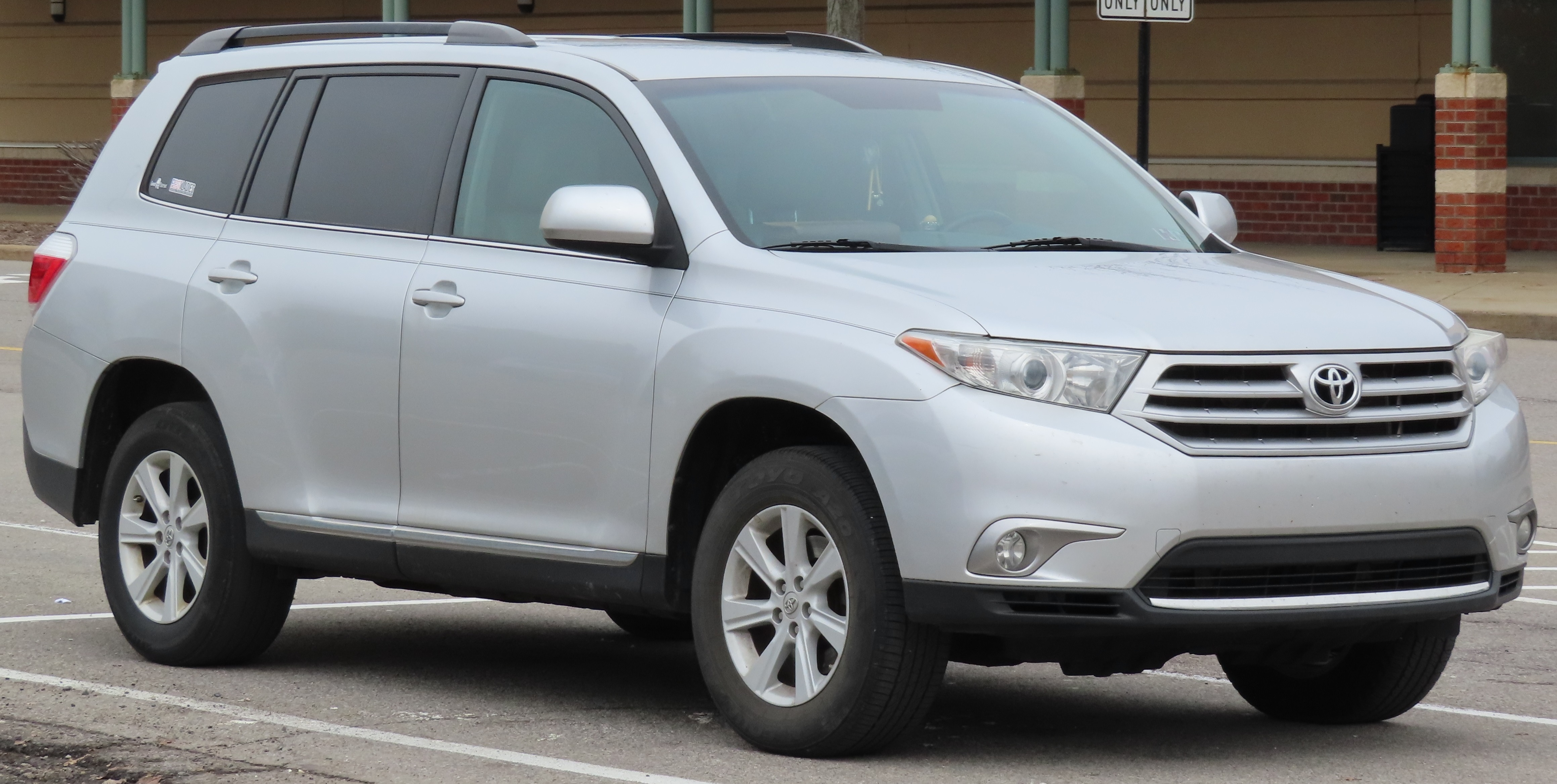
Toyota Highlander/Kluger (XU40)

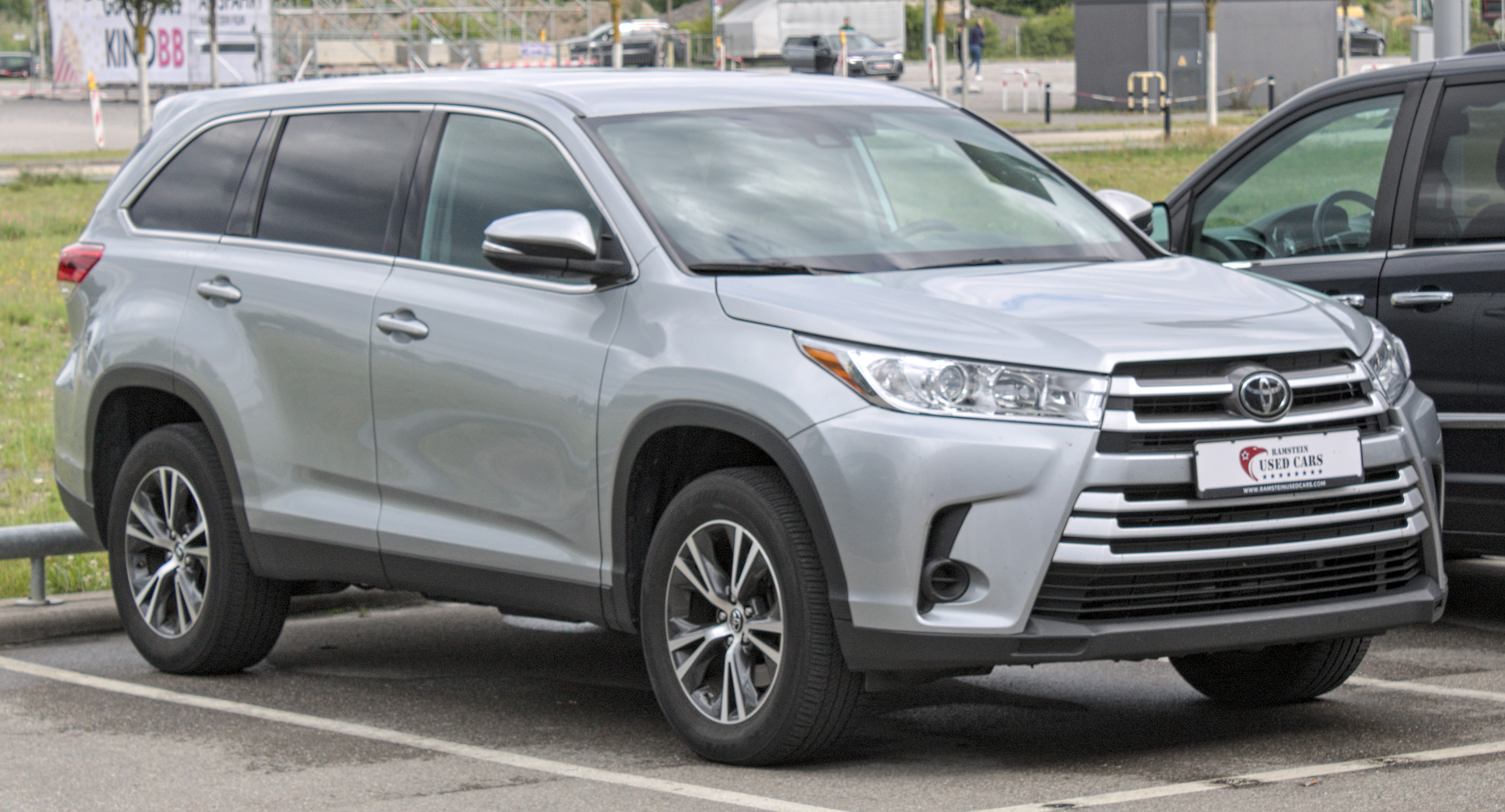
Toyota Highlander/Kluger (XU50)

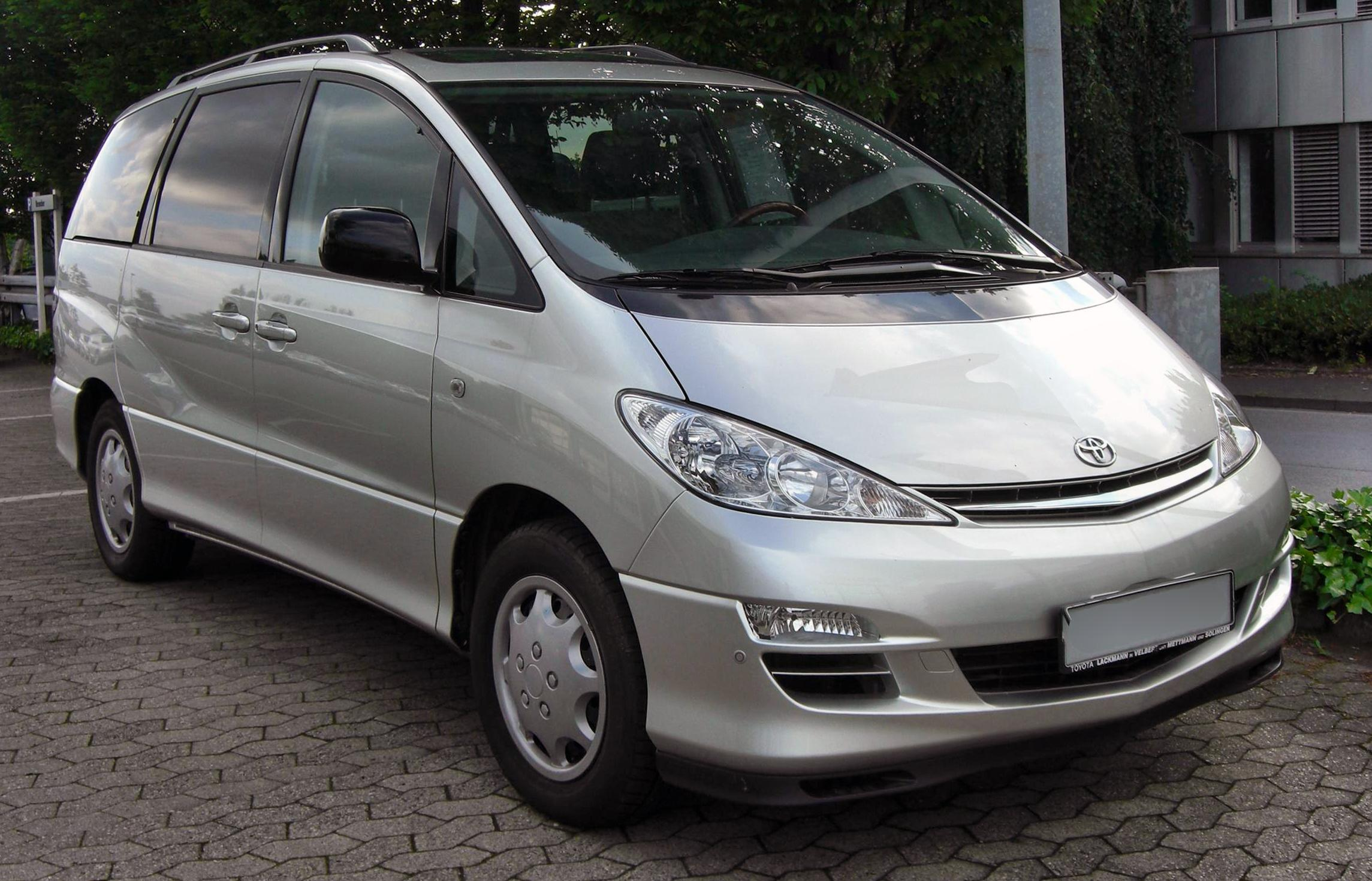
Toyota Previa/Estima/Tarago

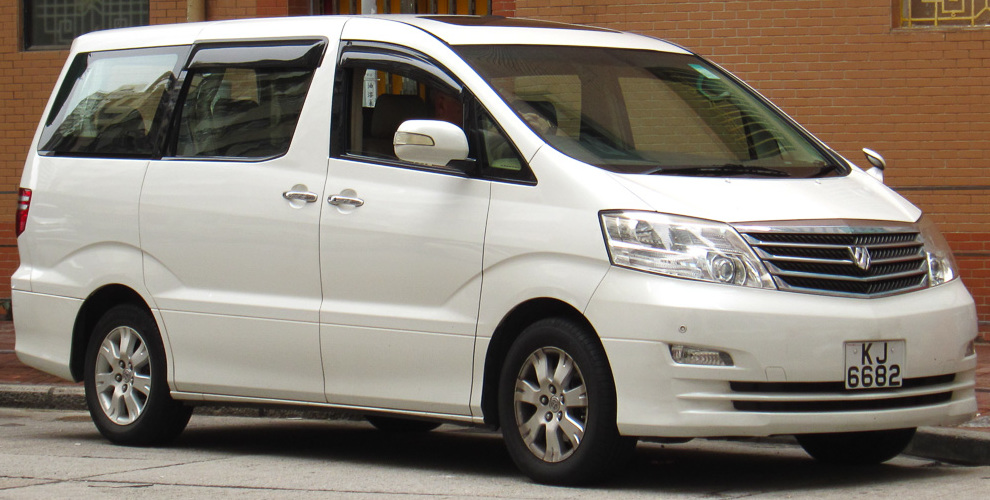
Toyota Alphard

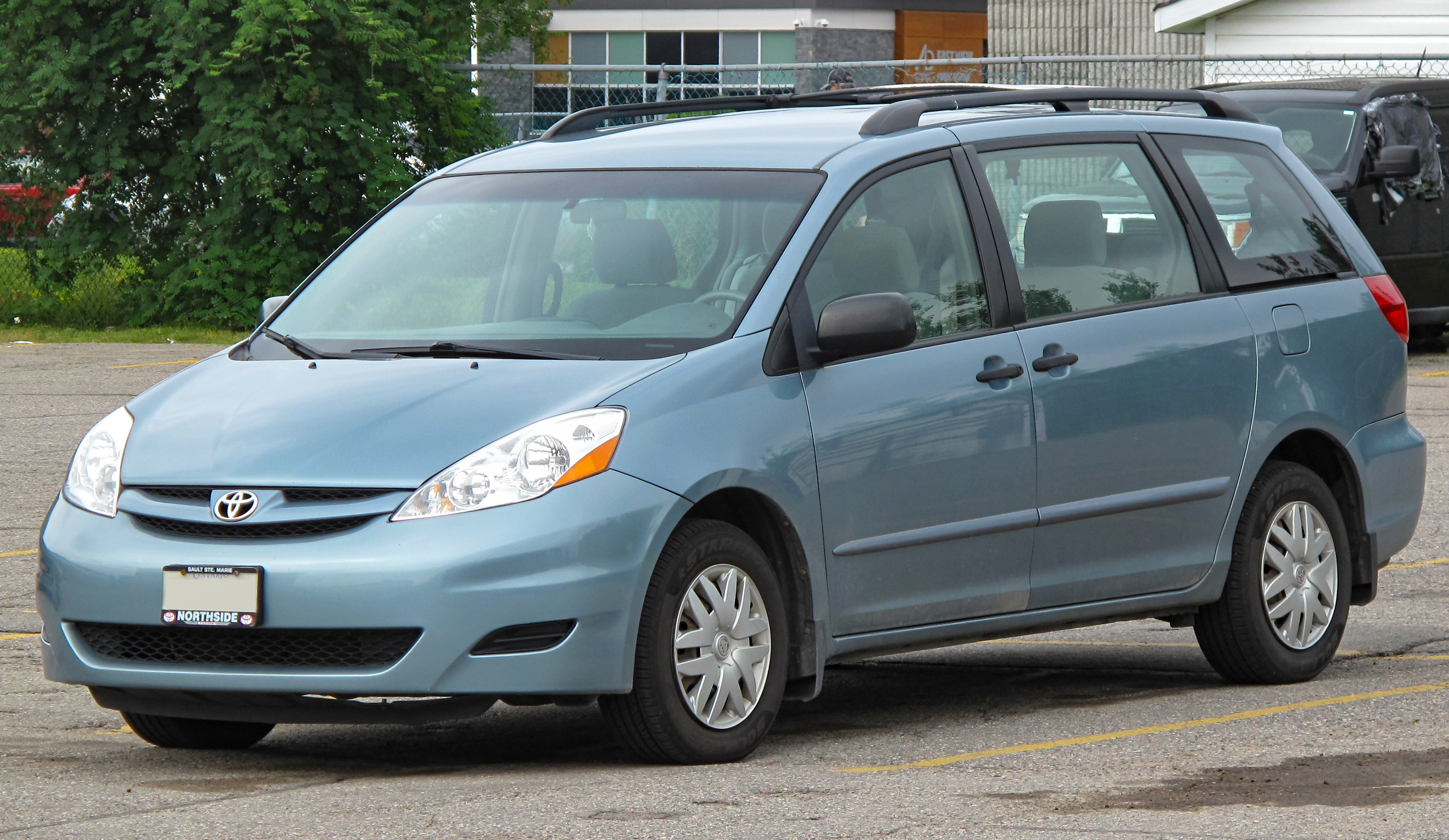
Toyota Sienna (XL20)

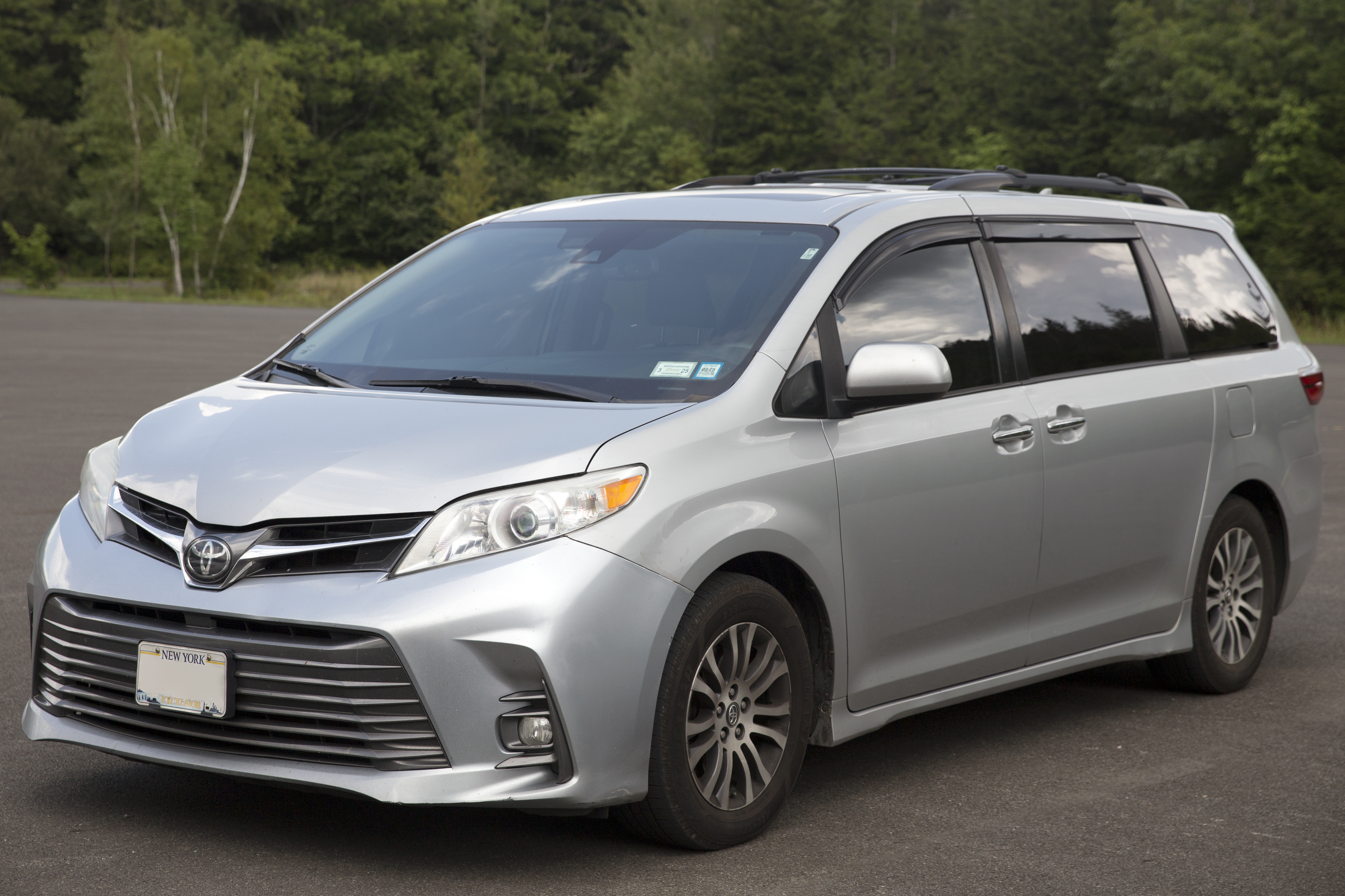
Toyota Sienna (XL30)

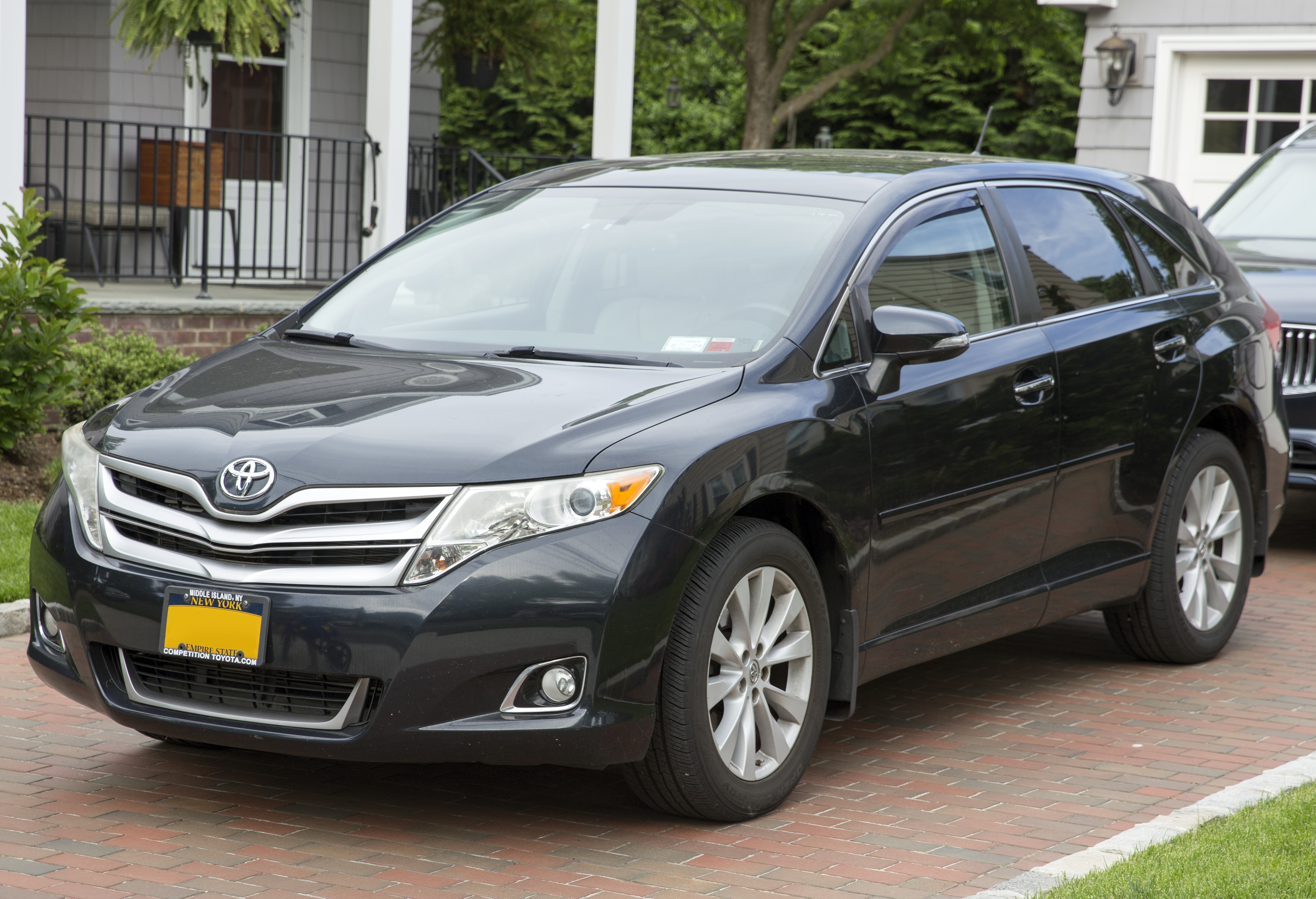
Toyota Venza

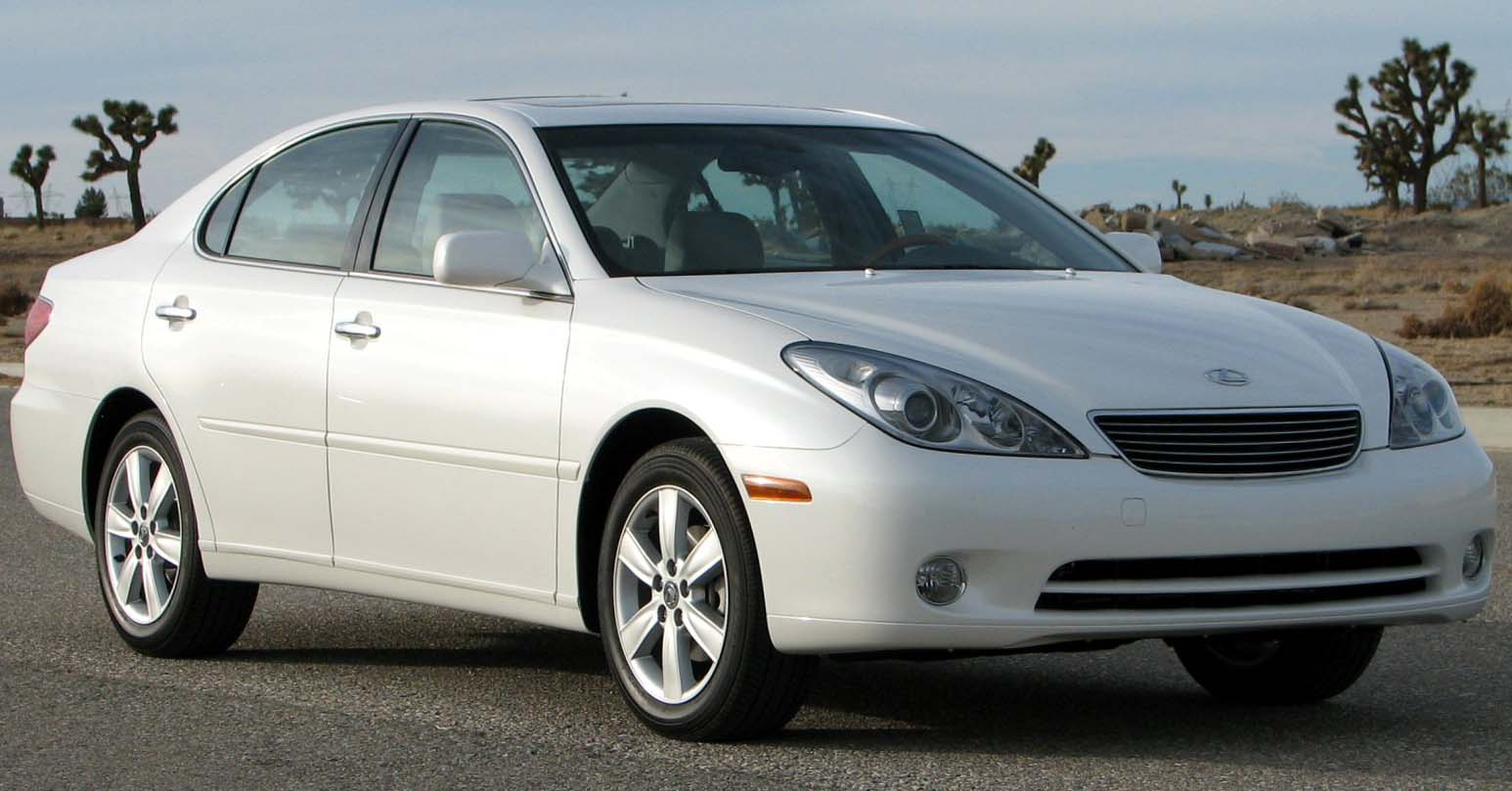
Lexus ES/Toyota Windom (XV30)

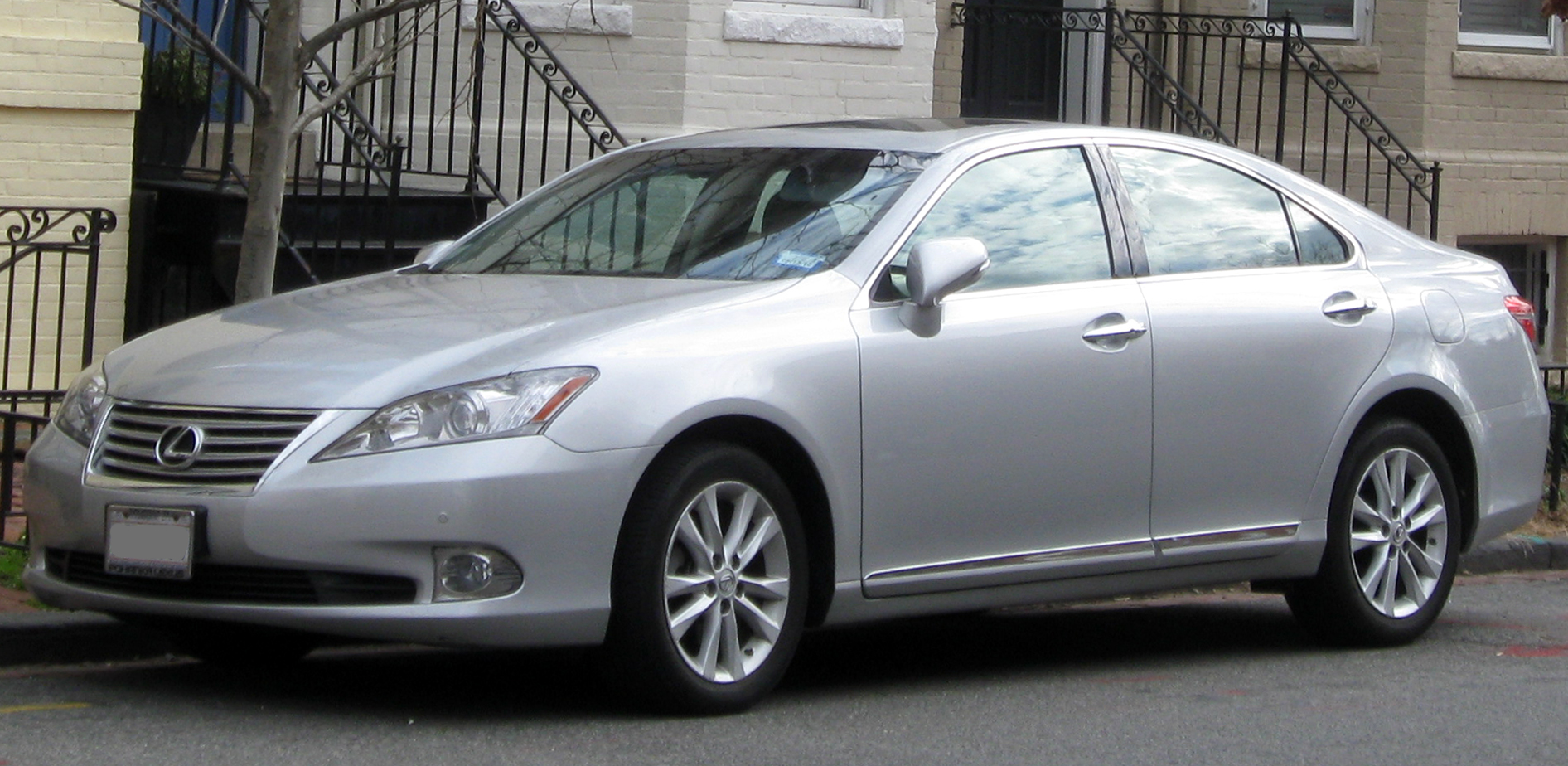
Lexus ES (XV40)

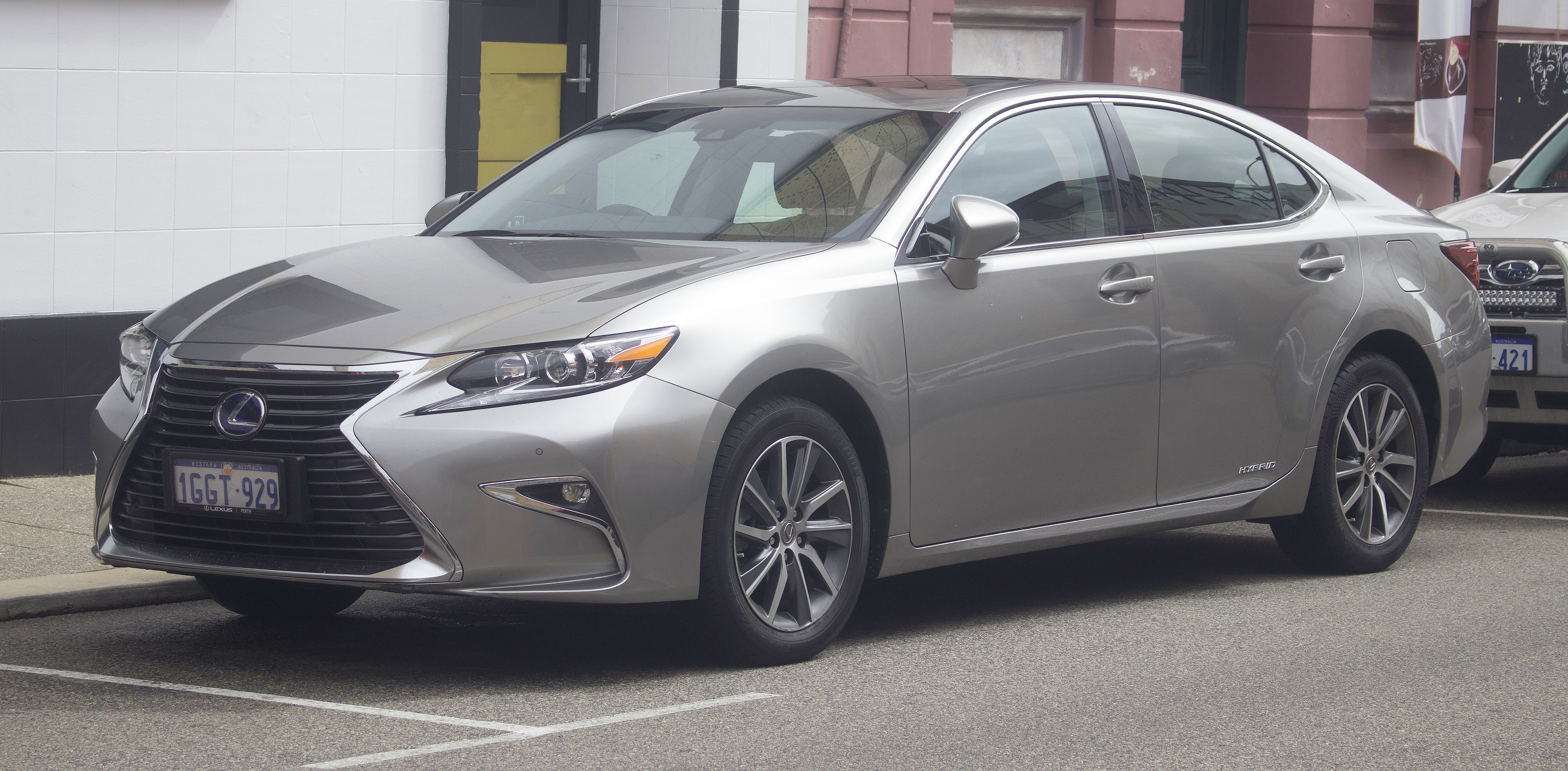
Lexus ES (XV60)

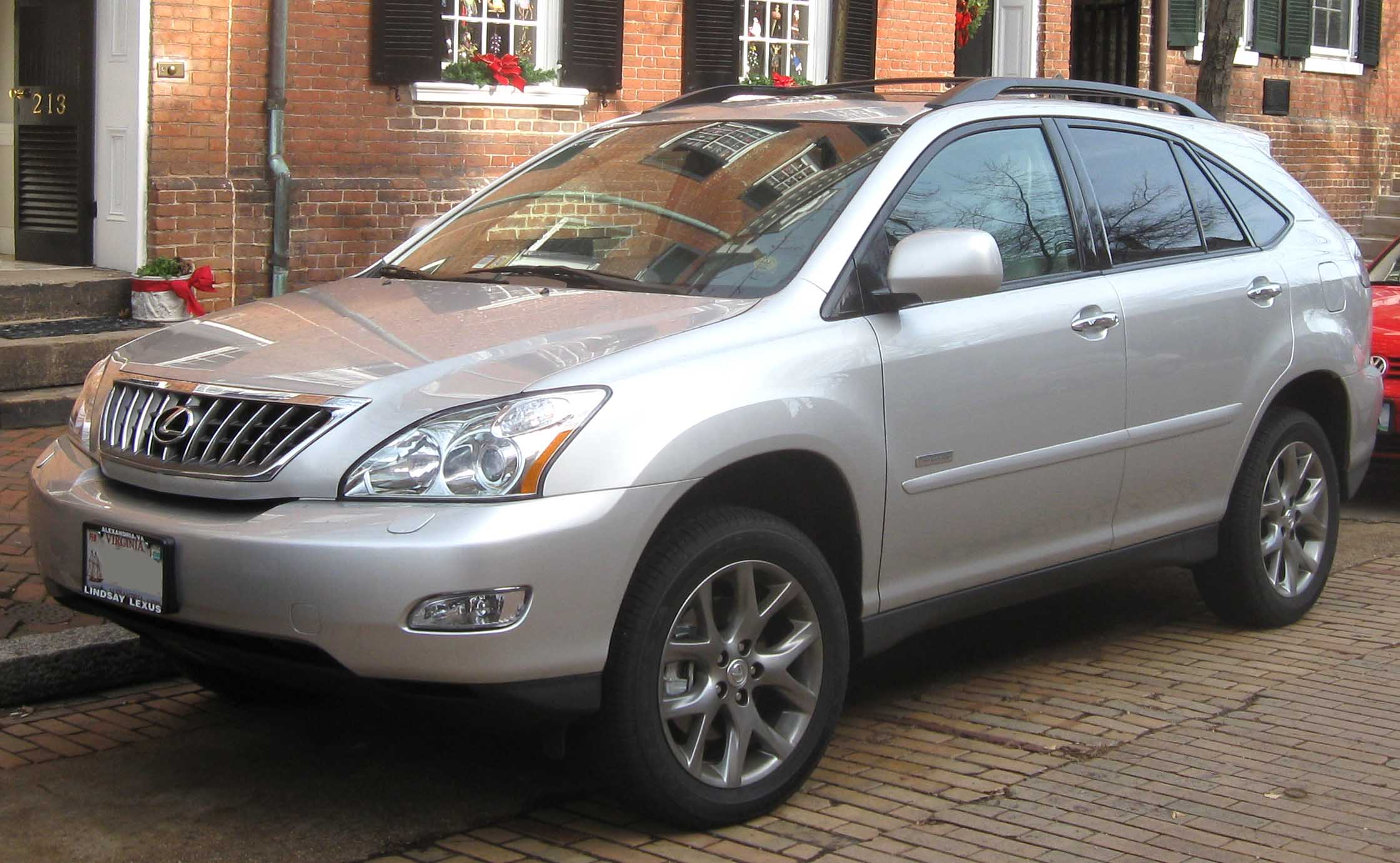
Lexus RX/Toyota Harrier (XU30)

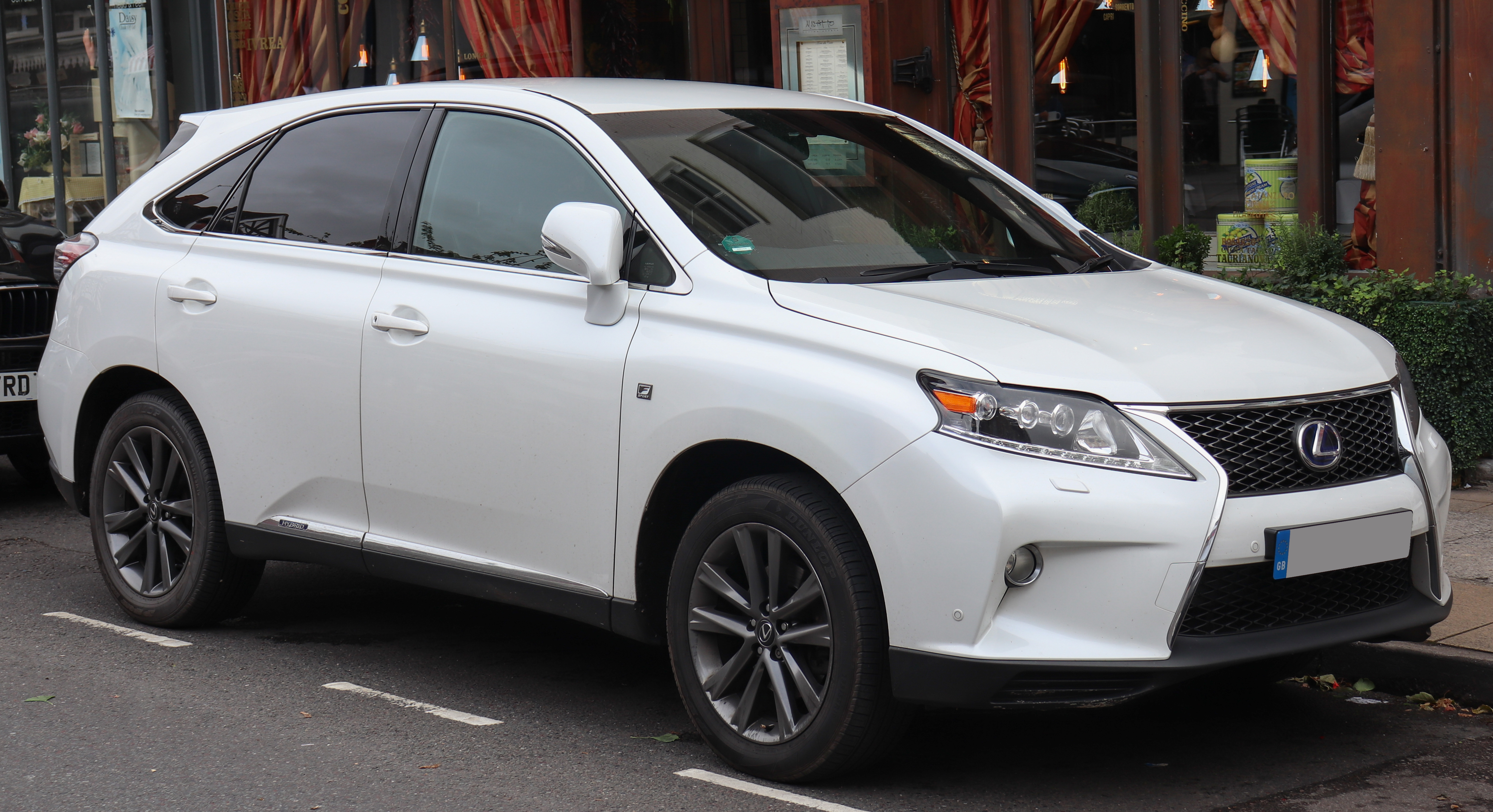
Lexus RX (AL10)

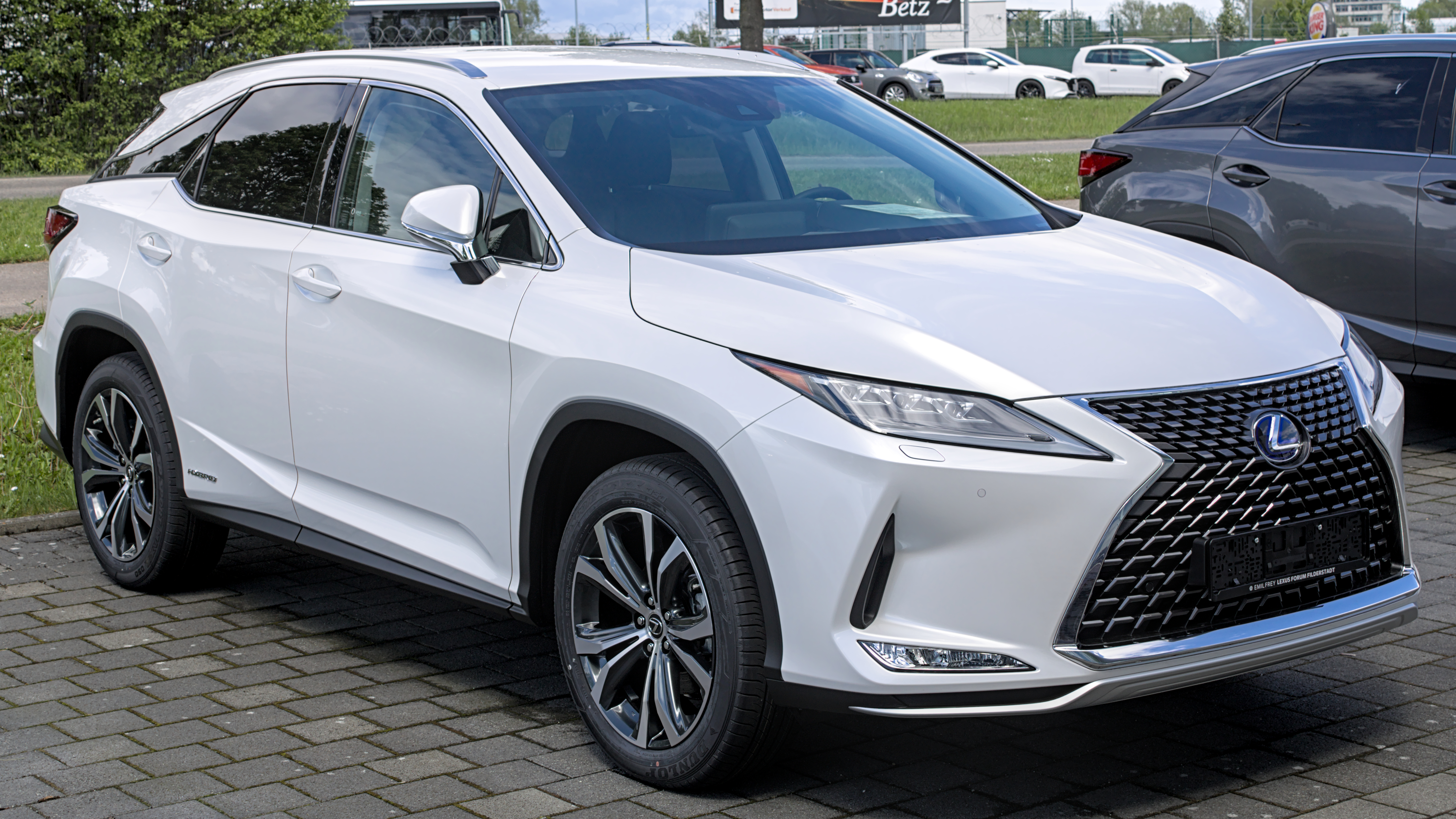
Lexus RX (AL20)
