= HR 4138 =

Star in the constellation Carina

- Location of HR 4138 (circled in red)

Observation data Epoch J2000 Equinox ICRS
- Constellation: Carina
- Right ascension: 10^{h} 30^{m} 20.12777^{s}
- Declination: −71° 59′ 34.0579″
- Apparent magnitude (V): +4.72

Characteristics
- Spectral type: A1V
- B−V color index: +0.042±0.007
- Variable type: Rotating variable

Astrometry
| Radial velocity (R_{v}) | +7.5±0.4 km/s |
| Proper motion (μ) | RA: +27.896 mas/yr Dec.: −30.148 mas/yr |
| Parallax (π) | 11.7934±0.1025 mas |
| Distance | 277 ± 2 ly (84.8 ± 0.7 pc) |
| Absolute magnitude (M_{V}) | 0.21 |

Details
| Mass | 2.3±0.3 M_{☉} |
| Radius | 3.43±0.11 R_{☉} |
| Luminosity | 75±4 L_{☉} |
| Surface gravity (log g) | 3.73±0.07 cgs |
| Temperature | 9,161±137 K |
| Metallicity [Fe/H] | +0.06 dex |
| Rotation | likely 3.0 to 3.2 days |
| Rotational velocity (v sin i) | 12 km/s |
| Age | 403 Myr |

Other designations
- K Car, CPD−71°1034, FK5 2842, GC 14457, HD 91375, HIP 51438, HR 4138, SAO 256722

Database references
| SIMBAD | data |

HR 4138 is a single star in the constellation Carina. It has the Bayer designation K Carinae, abbreviated K Car, while HR 4138 is the star's designation in the Bright Star Catalogue. It has a white hue and is faintly visible to the naked eye with an apparent visual magnitude of +4.72. This star is located at a distance of 277 light years based on parallax measurements, and it is drifting further away with a radial velocity of +7.5 km/s. Judging from its motion through space, it is a candidate member of the Sirius supercluster.

== Characteristics ==
The spectrum of K Carinae matches a spectral class of A1V, with the luminosity class V indicating that it is a main sequence star that generates energy by the fusion of helium at its core. This star is 2.3 times more massive than the Sun, with a radius 3.43 times the radius of the Sun and a luminosity 75 times solar. The effective temperature of 9,160 K give it a blue-white hue typical of A-type stars. It has an age estimated at 400 million years and has a low projected rotational velocity of 12 km/s. Unexpectedly for an A-type star, a magnetic field has been detected.

The star has an overabundance of lanthanides and heavy elements on its surface, and thus is classified as chemically peculiar. While elements such as helium are depleted relative to the Sun, and light (Z < 30) elements have solar-like abundances, heavier elements such as barium, strontium, yttrium and zirconium are overabundant. The abundance of mercury is around 15,000 times solar. The uneven distribution of silicon and iron on its surface make K Carinae variable in the far-ultraviolet – the variability happens due to its rotation, which is believed to have a period between 3.0 and 3.2 days.

K Carinae displays an infrared excess, indicating the presence of an orbiting debris disk with a black body temperature of 45 K at a separation of 314.2 AU from the host star.
