= 91 FM =

- Maracanaú, Ceará; Brazil
- Broadcast area: Fortaleza, Ceará
- Frequency: 91.3 MHz
- Branding: 91,3. A FM de Fortaleza.

Programming
- Language: Portuguese
- Format: Defunct

Ownership
- Owner: Sistema Comercial de Comunicações Ltda.
- Operator: A3 Entretenimento

History
- First air date: June 12, 2006
- Last air date: July 9, 2017
- Former names: Top FM; Fortal FM; A3 FM

Technical information
- Licensing authority: ANATEL
- Class: A4

91 FM was a Brazilian radio station based in Fortaleza, Ceará, and licensed to Maracanaú. The radio station was part of A3 Entretenimento, a conglomerate of companies focused on promoting and producing events and forró bands, led by Zequinha Aristides.

The station was launched in 2006 with a project for CHR audiences, through Top FM and later Fortal FM. With the emergence of A3 FM in 2011, the station began to focus its programming on the popular segment.

== History ==
=== Top FM and Fortal FM (2006-2011) ===
The radio station was inaugurated on June 12, 2006, on the occasion of Dia dos Namorados, and was named Top FM. The style of the radio was CHR, combined with popular programming, and it had a musical program with very few commercial breaks. After two years, the radio station closed down, giving way to Fortal FM, a partnership between Zequinha Aristides (owner of the radio station) and Carnailha, the company that organizes Fortal. Fortal FM made its debut in 2008, in a test phase. At noon on June 6, 2009, the radio station had its official launch. The radio station had pop music-oriented programming and also promoted the artists taking part in Fortal, mostly axé music artists. Its artistic production followed the trends of radio stations in São Paulo, with part of its artwork produced with the North American studio Reel World.

In December 2010, the radio station announced the end of its frequency modulated broadcasts to make way for A3 FM, a popular music station directly linked to its controlling group, A3 Entretenimento. Fortal FM then changed its slogan to "A sua web rádio" ("Your web radio"), as its broadcasts would continue on the internet. On January 15, 2011, the radio station officially left the FM dial.

=== A3 FM and 91 FM (2011-2017) ===
On January 17, 2011, 91.3 MHz was taken over by A3 FM, a popular radio station, and Fortal FM began broadcasting on the internet, which was not accepted by the public. The online radio station ceased operations on April 30, 2012, and in May, the team was transferred to Rádio Liderança. A3 FM was aired simultaneously with another radio station in the same style, belonging to the same group, 102 FM. 102 FM remained on air until March 31, 2011, when it gave way to the evangelical radio station Logos FM the following day.

With the change in style, A3 FM appeared among the ten most listened-to radio stations in Fortaleza, according to a 2012 Ibope measurement. At the end of October 2016, the radio station dropped the A3 brand and began to be identified as 91 FM. In November, the radio station laid off part of its team. Radio presenters such as Rasga Baleia and Camila Carla made their debut on the new Expresso FM in January 2017. On January 27, 2017, the station once again mixed popular music programming with pop music. From February 2017 onwards, it put out calls of expectation for a "new program", which ended up not premiering as planned.

At the end of June 2017, 91 FM began to look forward to the arrival of new programming, with confirmation from the Igreja Jerusalém da Grandeza de Deus that it would take over the frequency, with the entry of gospel radio station Jerusalem FM. In July 2017, 91 FM began to include gospel songs in its programming, and did so until July 5, 2017, when religious programming took over permanently. On July 10, 2017, the frequency was definitively identified as Rádio Jerusalém FM. From then on, the frequency began its journey with Christian broadcasters, later taking over the programming of Nova Rádio Cristã and Logos FM.

== Programs ==
Fortal FM's programs

- Club 91
- D'Boa
- Hora Aditivada
- Music Nation
- Outros Sons
- Programação Exagerada
- Rádio Elétrico
- Siriguella Beats
- Web Hits
- Torcida 91

A3 FM and 91 FM programs

- A Hora do João Rufino
- A Voz que Clama no Deserto (independent)
- Aviões & Convidados
- Balada A3
- Butikim do Baleia
- Canal do Vovô
- Clássicos do Forró
- Clube do Samba
- Domingão da A3
- Eu, Você e a Saudade
- Faixa Nobre do Esporte
- Festa A3
- Ligue se Ligue
- Madrugada A3
- Oração da Madrugada (independent)
- Pistolão
- Play de Domingo
- Programa do Lobão
- Programa Paulo Nascimento
- Sabadão da A3 and Sabadão da 91
- Show do Pepiteiro
- Vivendo o Verdadeiro Amor (independent)

== Broadcasters' team ==
=== Presenters ===
Fortal FM presenters

- Aldair Dantas
- Amanda Estanislau
- Felipe Arantes
- Julinho Lemos

A3 FM and 91 FM presenters

- Albino Moreira
- Allex Motta
- André Luiz
- Camila Carla
- Elton Torres
- Fabiano Santos
- Fábio Biola
- Guido Albuquerque
- Jana Risti
- João Rufino
- Jorge Caffé
- Leyla Diogenes
- Lobão
- Luciano Filho
- Queiroz Ribeiro
- Rasga Baleia

=== Sports team ===
Speakers

- Jota Rômulo

Commentators

- César Figueiredo
- Diomar Sousa
- Edmilson Maciel
- Martins Andrade
- Pedro Mapurunga
- Regis Melo
- J.P. Quintela

Reporters

- Alex Oliveira (Fortaleza Esporte Clube sectorist)
- Alysson Lima
- Rodrigo Cavalcante (Ceará Sporting Club sectorist)

Anchor

- Adriano Júnior

== Bibliography ==
- Canalito, Jorge; Leme, Paulinho (2007). Rádio FM: Em Fortaleza é outra história. Fortaleza, Ceará: Premius Editora. ISBN 9788590732907.
