= WJSG =

- Hamlet, North Carolina; United States
- Frequency: 104.3 MHz
- Branding: GNN Radio

Programming
- Format: Christian

Ownership
- Owner: Augusta Radio Fellowship Institute, Inc.

History
- Former call signs: WSJG (1991–1991)

Technical information
- Licensing authority: FCC
- Facility ID: 29672
- Class: C3
- ERP: 6,000 watts
- HAAT: 149 meters
- Transmitter coordinates: 34°48′39.00″N 79°43′38.00″W

Links
- Public license information: Public file; LMS
- Website: gnnradio.org

WJSG (104.3 FM) is a radio station licensed to Hamlet, North Carolina, United States. The station is owned by Augusta Radio Fellowship Instite, Inc.

== History ==
The station went on the air as WSJG on May 3, 1991. On July 31, 1991, the station changed its call sign to the current WJSG.

The original format was Christian country music.
