= KBQF =

Radio station in McFarland–Bakersfield, California

- McFarland, California; United States
- Broadcast area: Bakersfield, California
- Frequency: 104.3 MHz
- Branding: Kalor 104.3

Programming
- Format: Spanish rhythmic

Ownership
- Owner: Jab Broadcasting, LLC

History
- First air date: January 17, 2007
- Call sign meaning: Bakersfield Q McFarland

Technical information
- Licensing authority: FCC
- Facility ID: 166077
- Class: A
- ERP: 6,000 watts
- HAAT: 99.6 meters (327 ft)
- Transmitter coordinates: 35°31′35″N 119°18′43″W

Links
- Public license information: Public file; LMS
- Webcast: Listen live
- Website: kalor-live.com

KBQF (104.3 FM) is a class A radio station broadcasting to McFarland, California. The station is owned by Jab Broadcasting, LLC.

== History ==
KBQF began broadcasting on January 17, 2007.
