= KJHB-LP =

- Jackson, Wyoming; United States
- Frequency: 104.3 MHz
- Branding: The Bronc

Programming
- Format: Album-oriented rock

Ownership
- Owner: Teton County School District #1

History
- Former frequencies: 97.7 MHz (2002–2015)

Technical information
- Licensing authority: FCC
- Facility ID: 126884
- Class: L1
- ERP: 100 watts
- HAAT: −154.0 meters (−505.2 ft)
- Transmitter coordinates: 43°27′25″N 110°48′4″W

Links
- Public license information: LMS
- Website: jhhsbroncs.com/0607jhhs/studentsParents/radio/radio/index.html

KJHB-LP (104.3 FM, "The Bronc") is a low-power radio station broadcasting an album-oriented rock format. Licensed to Jackson, Wyoming, United States, the station is currently owned by Teton County School District #1.
