= KWOH-LP =

- Biola, California; United States
- Broadcast area: Metro Biola
- Frequency: 104.3 MHz

Programming
- Format: Adult standards Oldies; Soft AC

Ownership
- Owner: Window of Heaven Ministry Network

History
- First air date: February 19, 2015
- Former call signs: KJOU-LP (2014–2015); KJOI-LP (2015–2023)
- Call sign meaning: Window of Heaven

Technical information
- Licensing authority: FCC
- Facility ID: 194666
- Class: L1
- Power: 66 watts
- HAAT: 36.8 meters (121 ft)
- Transmitter coordinates: 36°48′4.90″N 120°0′58.10″W

Links
- Public license information: LMS

KWOH-LP is an adult standards and soft AC formatted broadcast radio station licensed to and serving Biola, California.

KWOH-LP is owned and operated by Window of Heaven Ministry Network.
