= WAYO-LP =

- Rochester, New York; United States
- Broadcast area: Rochester
- Frequency: 104.3 MHz FM
- Branding: WAYO

Programming
- Language: English
- Format: Freeform

Ownership
- Owner: Multi-Use Community Cultural Center

History
- First air date: January 4, 2016; 10 years ago
- Call sign meaning: WAY Out

Technical information
- Licensing authority: FCC
- Facility ID: 192365
- Class: L1
- ERP: 39 watts
- HAAT: 45 meters
- Transmitter coordinates: 43°9′35.00″N 77°34′44.00″W

Links
- Public license information: LMS
- Webcast: listen live
- Website: wayofm.org

WAYO-LP (104.3 FM) is a listener-supported community low-power radio station based in Rochester, New York.

WAYO's studios are located in the Fedder Industrial Park on East Main Street in Rochester and the station broadcasts from a tower on the building's roof formerly used by WJZR during that station's time in the market.

== History ==
After raising startup costs for the station via Indiegogo and later underwriting, online broadcasting began on November 30, 2015. The launch of FM radio broadcasting began on January 4, 2016.
