= KCAR-FM =

- Baxter Springs, Kansas; United States
- Broadcast area: Joplin, Missouri
- Frequency: 104.3 MHz
- Branding: The Rewind 104.3 FM

Programming
- Format: Adult contemporary

Ownership
- Owner: American Media Investments

History
- First air date: 1998 (as KBGZ)
- Former call signs: KBGZ (1998–2001)

Technical information
- Licensing authority: FCC
- Facility ID: 86554
- Class: A
- ERP: 3,500 watts
- HAAT: 127 meters (417 ft)
- Transmitter coordinates: 37°4′10.00″N 94°32′49.00″W

Links
- Public license information: Public file; LMS

KCAR-FM (104.3 FM) is an American radio station broadcasting an adult contemporary format. Licensed to Baxter Springs, Kansas, it serves the greater Joplin, Missouri area. The station is currently owned by American Media Investments of Pittsburg, Kansas. The station carried an oldies format for many years, until March 12, 2010, when it flipped to comedy as "LOL 104.3." On October 18, 2012, the station flipped to Hot AC, branded as "Star 104.3". On February 1, 2019, the station switched back to a classic hits format branded as "The Rewind on 104.3 FM". By 2023, the station flipped to an AC format, retaining its Rewind branding but shorten to just "The Rewind 104.3".

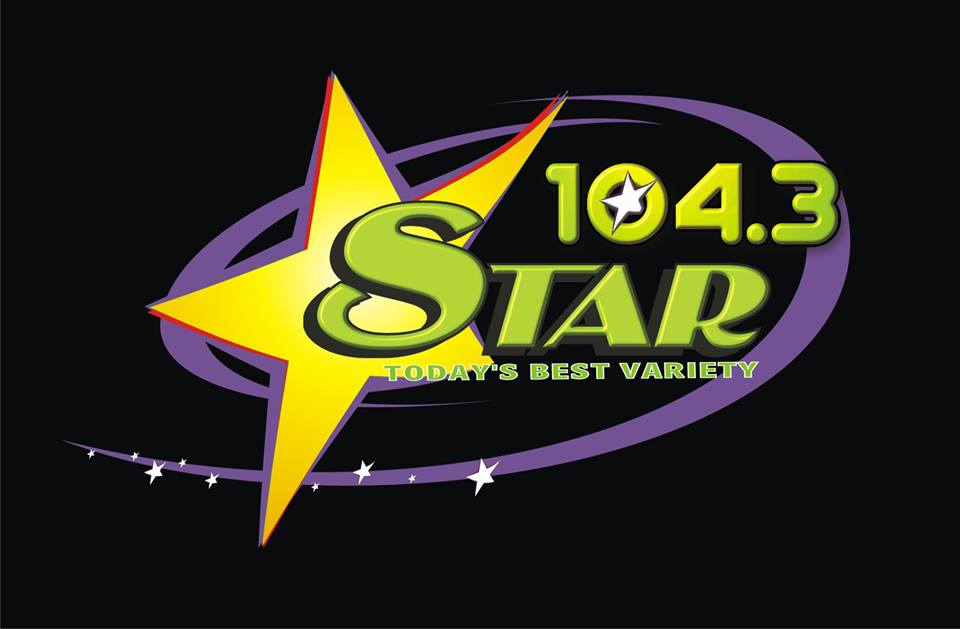
Star 104.3 logo from 2012 to 2019

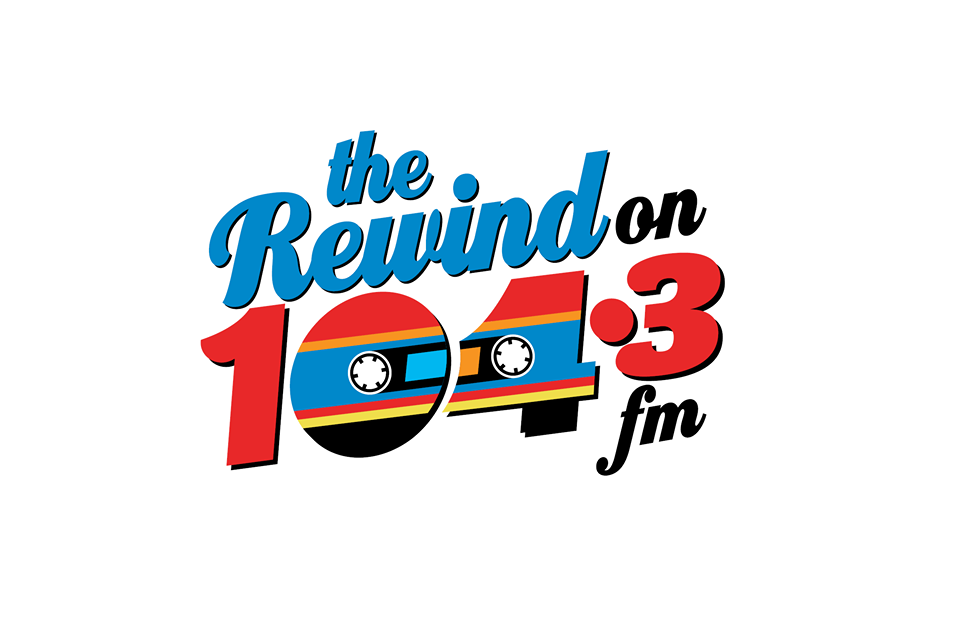
Rewind 104.3 logo from 2019 to 2023
