= WXBC (FM) =

- Hardinsburg, Kentucky; United States
- Frequency: 104.3 MHz

Programming
- Format: Classic Country
- Affiliations: Fox News Radio

Ownership
- Owner: Breckinridge Broadcasting Co., Inc.

Technical information
- Licensing authority: FCC
- Facility ID: 6700
- Class: A
- ERP: 2,300 watts
- HAAT: 115.0 meters
- Transmitter coordinates: 37°46′14″N 86°26′7″W

Links
- Public license information: Public file; LMS
- Website: wxbc1043.com

WXBC (104.3 FM) is a radio station broadcasting a Classic Country format. Licensed to Hardinsburg, Kentucky, United States. The station is currently owned by Breckinridge Broadcasting Co., Inc. and features programming from Fox News Radio.
