= WAJQ-FM =

Radio station in Alma, Georgia, United States

- Alma, Georgia; United States
- Frequency: 104.3 MHz
- Branding: Classic Country 104.3

Programming
- Format: Classic country

Ownership
- Owner: Blueberry Broadcasting Company, Inc.
- Sister stations: WAWO

History
- First air date: December 11, 1984 (as WULF-FM)
- Former call signs: WULF-FM (1984–1987); WKXH-FM (1987–1994)

Technical information
- Licensing authority: FCC
- Facility ID: 63862
- Class: A
- ERP: 4,500 watts
- HAAT: 113.0 meters
- Transmitter coordinates: 31°36′26.00″N 82°32′46.00″W

Links
- Public license information: Public file; LMS

WAJQ-FM (104.3 FM) is a radio station broadcasting a classic country format licensed to Alma, Georgia, United States. The station is currently owned by Blueberry Broadcasting Company, Inc.

== History ==
The station went on the air as WULF-FM on December 11, 1984. On May 5, 1987, the station changed its call sign to WKXH-FM, changing again on November 4, 1994, to the current WAJQ-FM.
