= WAWO =

- Alma, Georgia; United States
- Frequency: 1400 kHz

Programming
- Format: Catholic

Ownership
- Owner: Blueberry Broadcasting Company, Inc.

History
- Former call signs: WULF (?-1994); WAJQ (1994–2011)

Technical information
- Licensing authority: FCC
- Facility ID: 63861
- Class: C
- Power: 1,000 watts unlimited
- Transmitter coordinates: 31°31′50.00″N 82°27′45.00″W
- Translator: (99.1 MHz) W256DS (Alma)

Links
- Public license information: Public file; LMS

WAWO (1400 AM) is a radio station licensed to Alma, Georgia, United States. The station is currently owned by Blueberry Broadcasting Company, Inc.
