= KHMR (FM) =

- Lovelady, Texas; United States
- Broadcast area: Crockett, Trinity, Madisonville
- Frequency: 104.3 MHz

Programming
- Format: Classic Rock

Ownership
- Owner: KM Communications Inc.; (KM Radio of Lovelady LLC)

History
- First air date: March 9, 2009

Technical information
- Licensing authority: FCC
- Facility ID: 164205
- Class: C3
- ERP: 10,500 watts
- HAAT: 152.5 meters (500 feet)
- Transmitter coordinates: 31°11′30″N 95°29′32″W

Links
- Public license information: Public file; LMS

KHMR (104.3 FM) is a radio station licensed to serve Lovelady, Texas. Owned by KM Communications of Skokie, Illinois, it received its license to cover on March 9, 2009, but has remained mostly under Silent STA (Special Temporary Authority) since sign on due to financial reasons, as specified in the request for STA.

As of early March 2016, the station had not yet reported a resumption of operations since its most recent silent STA.

On April 6, 2016, KM Radio filed for resumption of operations. KHMR returned to the air utilizing the classic rock format it has used while broadcasting since the facility's inception. In 2017, the station adopted a Christian contemporary format.

The station went silent again in 2023, before returning again in 2024, this time with a Classic Rock format.
