= Georgia (U.S. state) =

U.S. state

- State
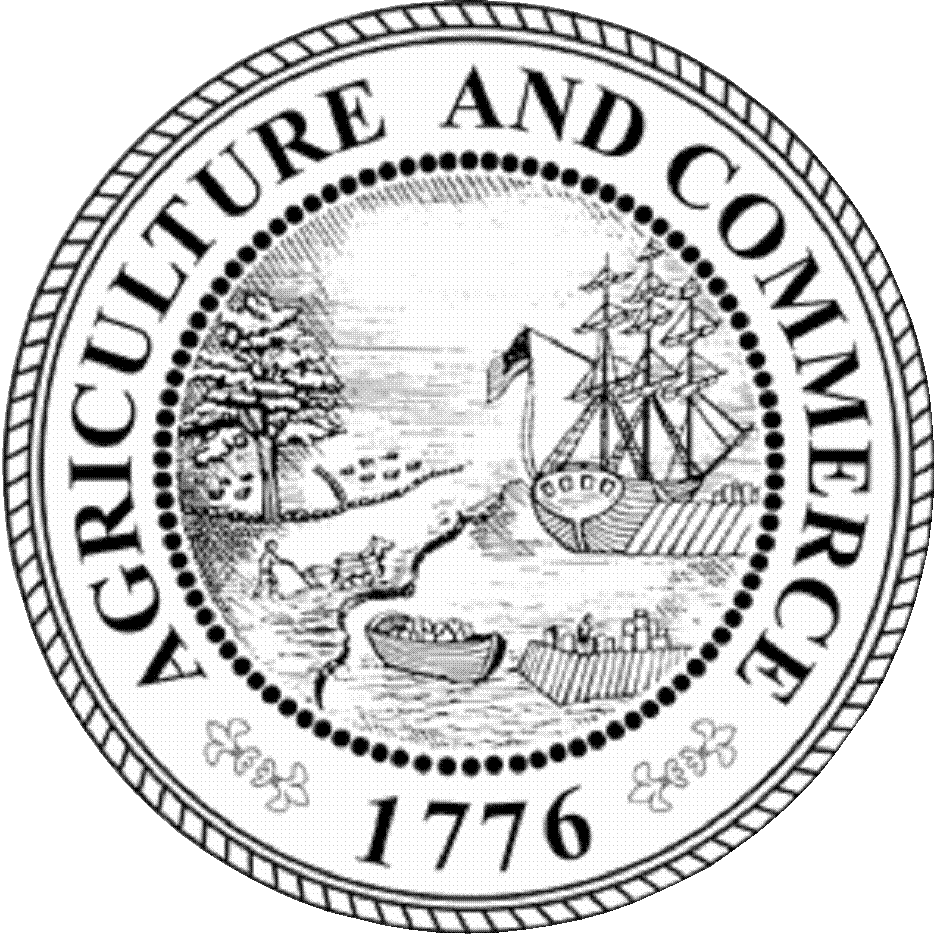
- Flag Seal
- Nicknames: Peach State; Empire State of the South
- Motto(s): "Wisdom, Justice & Moderation"
- Anthem: "Georgia on My Mind"
- Location of Georgia within the United States
- Country: United States
- Before statehood: Province of Georgia
- Admitted to the Union: January 2, 1788; 238 years ago (4th)
- Capital (and largest city): Atlanta
- Largest county or equivalent: Fulton
- Largest metro and urban areas: Atlanta

Government
  - Governor: Brian Kemp (R)
  - Lieutenant Governor: Burt Jones (R)
- Legislature: Georgia General Assembly
  - Upper house: Senate
  - Lower house: House of Representatives
- Judiciary: Supreme Court of Georgia
- U.S. senators: Jon Ossoff (D); Raphael Warnock (D)
- U.S. House delegation: 9 Republicans; 5 Democrats (list)

Area
  - Total: 59,420 sq mi (153,910 km^{2})
  - Land: 57,906 sq mi (149,976 km^{2})
  - Water: 1,519 sq mi (3,933 km^{2}) 2.6%
  - Rank: 24th

Dimensions
  - Length: 300 mi (480 km)
  - Width: 230 mi (370 km)
- Elevation: 590 ft (180 m)
- Highest elevation (Brasstown Bald (Note: Elevation adjusted to North American Vertical Datum of 1988)): 4,783 ft (1,458 m)
- Lowest elevation (Atlantic Ocean): 0 ft (0 m)

Population (2025)
  - Total: ▲11,302,748
  - Rank: 8th
  - Density: 185/sq mi (71.5/km^{2})
  - Rank: 16th
  - Median household income: $74,600 (2023)
  - Income rank: 25th
- Demonym: Georgian

Language
  - Official language: English
- Time zone: UTC−05:00 (Eastern)
  - Summer (DST): UTC−04:00 (EDT)
- USPS abbreviation: GA
- ISO 3166 code: US-GA
- Traditional abbreviation: Ga.
- Latitude: 30.356–34.985° N
- Longitude: 80.840–85.605° W
- Website: georgia.gov
- Symbols of Georgia
- Song: "Georgia on My Mind" by Ray Charles
- Amphibian: American green tree frog; Dryophytes cinereus
- Bird: Brown thrasher; Toxostoma rufum
- Butterfly: Eastern tiger swallowtail; Papilio glaucus
- Fish: Largemouth bass; Micropterus nigricans
- Flower: Cherokee rose; Rosa laevigata
- Fruit: Peach; Prunus persica
- Insect: Western honey bee; Apis mellifera
- Reptile: Gopher tortoise; Gopherus polyphemus
- Tree: Southern live oak; Quercus virginiana
- Vegetable: Vidalia onion; Allium cepa 'Granex'

Georgia (/ˈdʒɔːrdʒə/ JOR-jə) is a state in the Southeastern, South Atlantic, and Deep South regions of the United States. It borders Tennessee to the northwest, North Carolina and South Carolina to the northeast, the Atlantic Ocean to the east, Florida to the south, and Alabama to the west. Of the 50 U.S. states, Georgia is the 24th-largest by area and eighth-most populous. According to the U.S. Census Bureau, its 2025 estimated population was 11,302,748. Atlanta, a global city, is both the state's capital and its largest city. The Atlanta metropolitan area, with a population greater than 6.3 million people in 2023, is the eighth most populous metropolitan area in the United States and contains about 57% of Georgia's entire population. Other major metropolitan areas in the state include Augusta, Savannah, Columbus, and Macon.

The Province of Georgia was established in 1732, with its first settlement occurring in 1733 when Savannah was founded. By 1752, Georgia had transitioned into a British royal colony, making it the last and southernmost of the original Thirteen Colonies. On January 2, 1788, Georgia became the fourth state to ratify the United States Constitution. Between 1802 and 1804, a portion of western Georgia was carved out to create the Mississippi Territory, which eventually became the U.S. states of Alabama and Mississippi. Georgia declared its secession from the Union on January 19, 1861, joining the ranks of the original seven Confederate States. After the Civil War, it was the last state to be readmitted to the Union on July 15, 1870.

In the late 19th century, during the post-Reconstruction period, Georgia's economy underwent significant changes, driven by a coalition of influential politicians, business leaders, and journalists, notably Henry W. Grady, who promoted the "New South" ideology focused on reconciliation and industrialization. In the mid-20th century, several notable figures from Georgia, including Martin Luther King Jr., emerged as key leaders in the civil rights movement. Since 1945, Georgia has experienced significant population and economic expansion, aligning with the larger Sun Belt trend.

Georgia is defined by a diversity of landscapes, flora, and fauna, such as the Blue Ridge Mountains (part of the broader Appalachian Mountain range) and the Piedmont plateau. Except for some elevated areas in the Blue Ridge, Georgia predominantly experiences a humid subtropical climate.

== History ==
=== Pre-settlement ===
Before settlement by European colonists, Georgia was governed by mound building polities such as Ocute and Coosa. Human habitation in the region dates back thousands of years across four major archaeological periods: Paleoindian, Archaic, Woodland, and Mississippian cultures. During the Mississippian period, Indigenous populations developed a complex agricultural lifestyle, cultivating crops such as corn, beans, squash, and sunflowers, supplemented by hunting and fishing. Prominent Mississippian mound-building sites and chiefdoms flourished throughout the territory, including Etowah Indian Mounds, Ocmulgee Mounds, Ichisi, and Guale. Following 16th-century Spanish expeditions, such as that of Hernando de Soto, epidemic diseases and social instability caused the collapse of these chiefdoms, leading to the reorganization of surviving populations into historic tribes including the Muscogee (Creek) and Cherokee.

=== Colonial era and Revolutionary War ===
On February 12, 1733, a year after Georgia was established as a British colony, the Province of Georgia was established in Savannah by British General James Oglethorpe. It was administered by the Trustees for the Establishment of the Colony of Georgia in America under a charter issued by (and named for) King George II. The Trustees implemented an elaborate plan for the colony's settlement, known as the Oglethorpe Plan, which envisioned an agrarian society of yeoman farmers and prohibited slavery. The colony was invaded by the Spanish in 1742, during the War of Jenkins' Ear. In 1752, after the government failed to renew subsidies that had helped support the colony, the Trustees turned over control to the crown. Georgia became a crown colony, with a governor appointed by the king of Great Britain.

The Province of Georgia was one of the Thirteen Colonies that revolted against British rule in the American Revolution. Its delegates to the Second Continental Congress, which convened in present-day Independence Hall in Philadelphia, joined other delegates in unanimously approving the Declaration of Independence, which declared the Thirteen Colonies free and independent from British colonial rule.

=== Independence ===
Georgia's first constitution was ratified in February 1777. Georgia was the 10th state to ratify the Articles of Confederation on July 24, 1778, and was the 4th state to ratify the United States Constitution on January 2, 1788.

Cotton slaves in Georgia, c. 1850

After the Creek War (1813–1814), General Andrew Jackson forced the Muscogee (Creek) tribes to surrender land to Georgia, including in the Treaty of Fort Jackson (1814), surrendering 21 million acres in what is now southern Georgia and central Alabama, and the Treaty of Indian Springs (1825). In 1829, gold was discovered in the North Georgia mountains leading to the Georgia Gold Rush and establishment of a federal mint in Dahlonega, which continued in operation until 1861. The resulting influx of American settlers put pressure on the federal U.S. government to take land from the Cherokee Nation. In 1830, President Andrew Jackson signed into law the Indian Removal Act, sending many eastern Indian nations to reservations in present-day Oklahoma, including all of Georgia's tribes. President Jackson and the state of Georgia ignored the Supreme Court's ruling in Worcester v. Georgia (1832) that U.S. states were not permitted to redraw Indian boundaries. In 1838, his successor, Martin Van Buren, dispatched federal troops to gather the tribes and deport them west of the Mississippi. This forced relocation, known as the Trail of Tears, led to the death of more than four thousand Cherokees.

=== American Civil War ===
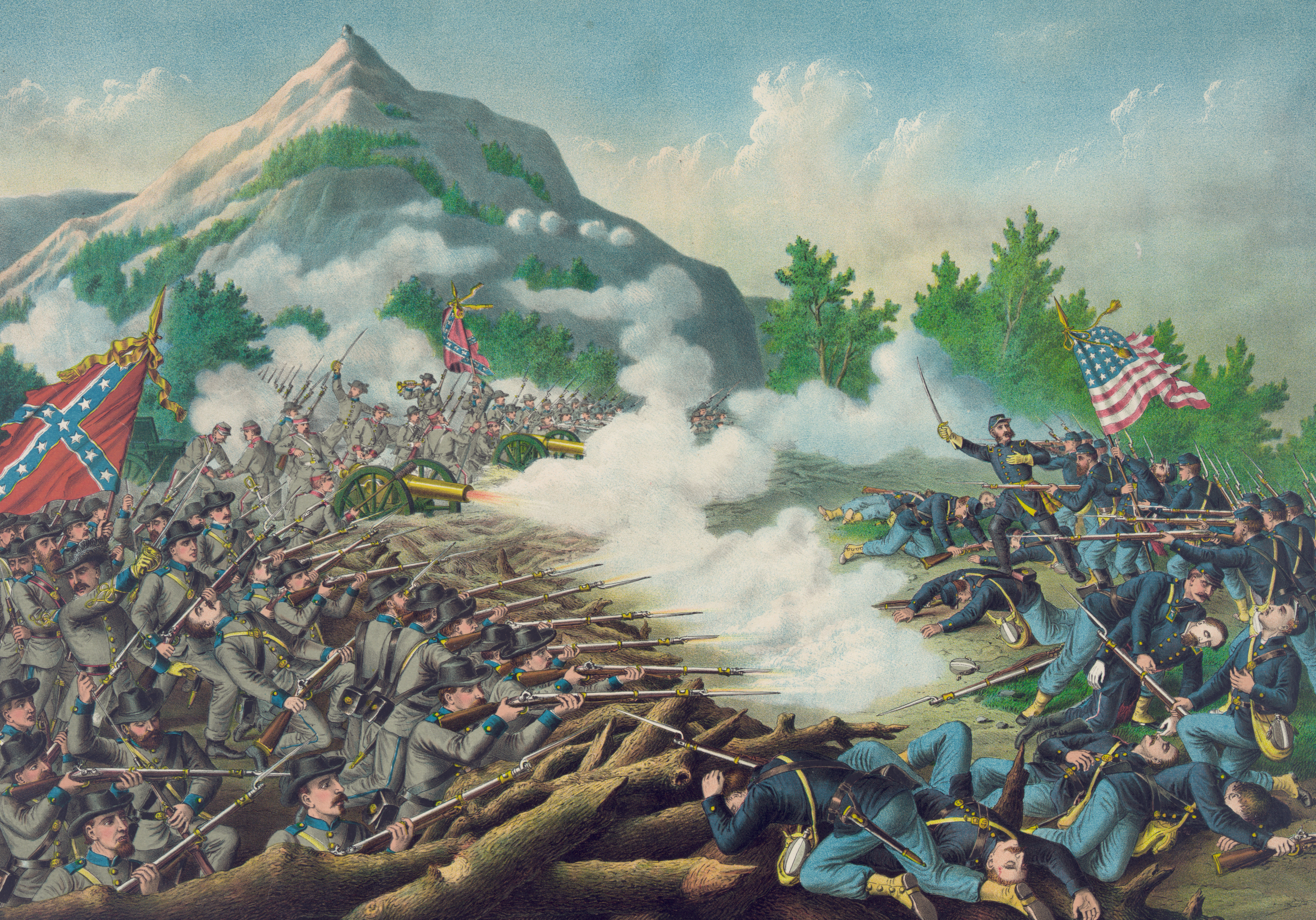
The Battle of Kennesaw Mountain in 1864

In early 1861, as the American Civil War commenced, Georgia chose to leave the Union to join the Confederacy. Support for secession from the Union enjoyed a majority among the state's delegates, which grew during successive votes, and the state ultimately became one of several major military theaters during the Civil War.

Major battles took place at Chickamauga, Kennesaw Mountain, and Atlanta. In December 1864, a large swath of the state from Atlanta to Savannah, was destroyed during General William Tecumseh Sherman's March to the Sea, during which 18,253 Georgian soldiers were killed, representing roughly one of every five then in service of the Confederacy. One of the most notorious Civil War sites in the state was Andersonville Prison, where nearly 13,000 Union prisoners of war died from disease, malnutrition, and overcrowding. Following the war, the camp's commander Henry Wirz was sentenced to death for war crimes and hanged, making him the highest-ranking Confederate official to be executed.

=== Reconstruction and civil rights ===
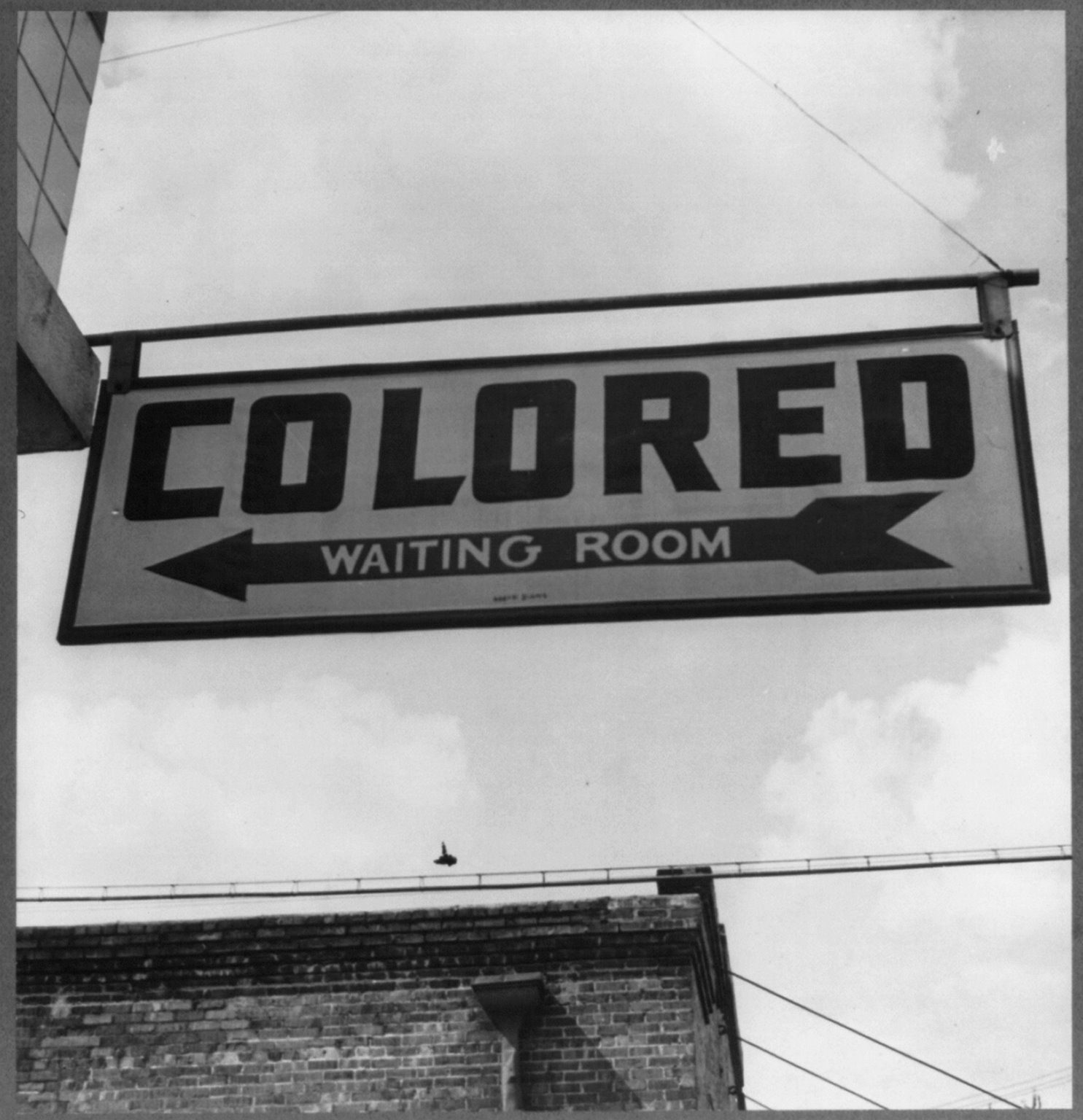
A so-called "Colored" waiting room sign in 1943 at a bus terminal in Rome, Georgia, where Jim Crow laws created "de jure" legally required segregation

Georgia did not re-enter the Union until July 15, 1870, as the last of the former Confederate states to be re-admitted. Federal troops would continue to be stationed in the state until the end of the Reconstruction era in 1877. White Democrats, having regained power in the state legislature, passed a poll tax in that year which disenfranchised many poor black (and some white) people, preventing them from registering. In 1908, the state established a white primary; with the only competitive contests within the Democratic Party, it was another way to exclude black people from politics. They constituted 46.7% of the state's population in 1900, but the proportion of Georgia's population that was African American dropped thereafter to 28%, primarily due to tens of thousands leaving the state during the Great Migration.

According to the Equal Justice Initiative's 2015 report on lynching in the United States (1877–1950), Georgia had 531 deaths, the second-highest total of these extralegal executions of any state in the South. The overwhelming number of victims were black and male. Many of the killings were committed by the white supremacist hate group the Ku Klux Klan (KKK), whose second iteration was formed at Georgia's Stone Mountain by William Joseph Simmons on November 25, 1915. The Klan's revival was spurned in part by the 1913 murder of 13-year-old Mary Phagan and the lynching two years later of her convicted killer, Jewish pencil factory supervisor and B'nai B'rith Atlanta chapter president Leo Frank. The affair led to the creation of the Anti-Defamation League, which successfully lobbied for Frank to be posthumously pardoned in 1986. Political disfranchisement persisted through the mid-1960s, until after Congress passed the Voting Rights Act of 1965.

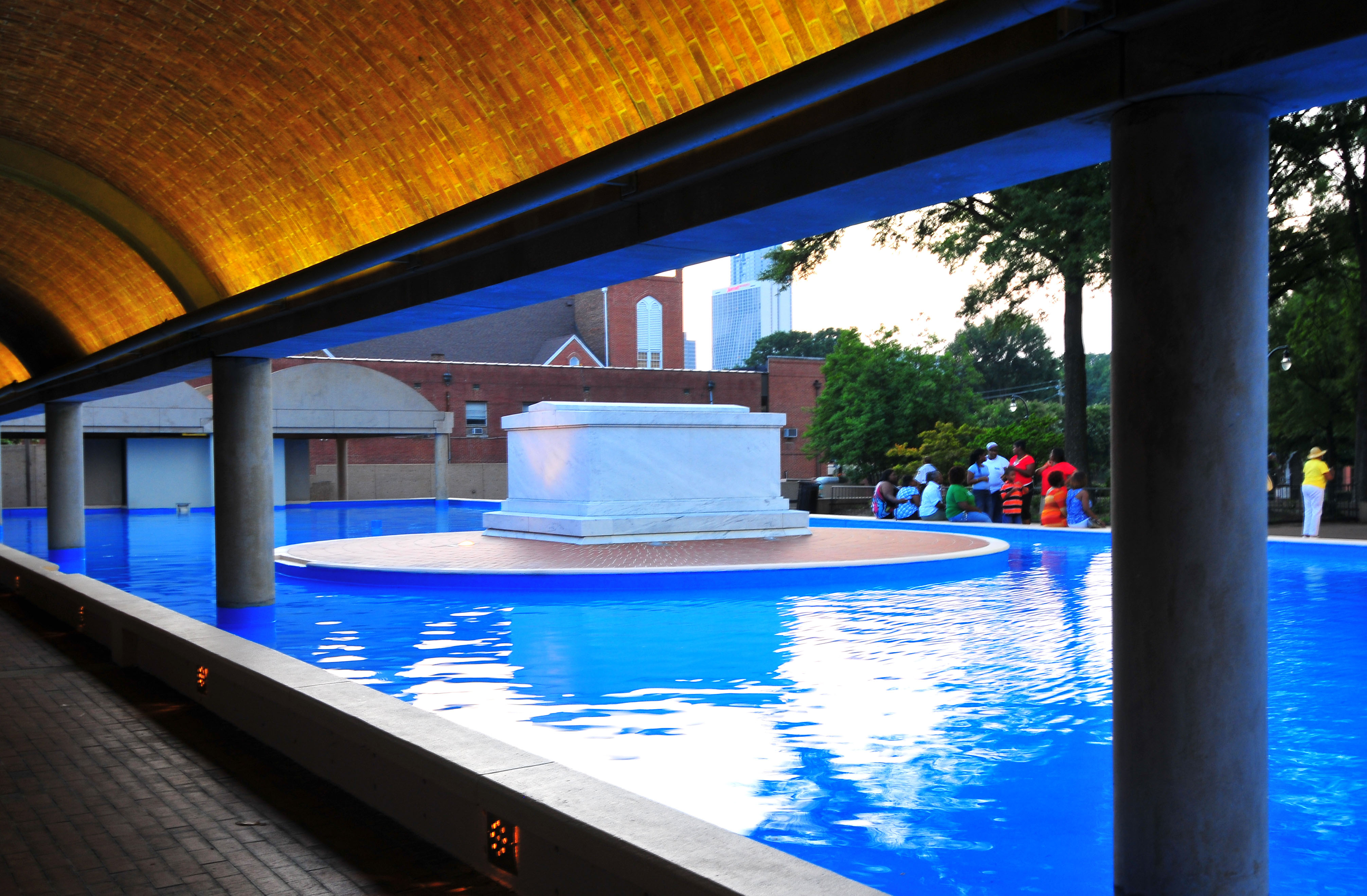
Martin Luther King Jr.'s tomb at Martin Luther King Jr. National Historical Park in Atlanta

Martin Luther King Jr., an Atlanta-born Baptist minister who was part of the educated middle class that had developed in the city's African-American community, emerged as a national leader in the civil rights movement in the 1950s. King joined with others to form the Southern Christian Leadership Conference (SCLC) in Atlanta in 1957 to provide political leadership for the civil rights movement across the South. In 1956, riots occurred at the Sugar Bowl in Atlanta following a clash between Georgia Tech's president Blake R. Van Leer and Governor Marvin Griffin.

On February 5, 1958, during a training mission flown by a B-47, a Mark 15 nuclear bomb, also known as the Tybee Bomb, was lost off the coast of Tybee Island near Savannah. The bomb was thought by the Department of Energy to lie buried in silt at the bottom of Wassaw Sound.

By the 1960s, the proportion of African Americans in Georgia had declined to 28% of the state's population, after waves of migration to the North and some immigration by whites. With their voting power diminished, it took some years for African Americans to win a state-wide office. Julian Bond, a civil rights leader, was elected to the Georgia's House of Representatives in 1965, and served multiple terms there and subsequently in Georgia's State Senate.

Atlanta mayor Ivan Allen Jr. testified before Congress in support of the Civil Rights Act, and Governor Carl Sanders worked with the Kennedy administration charged with ensuring the state's compliance. Ralph McGill, editor and syndicated columnist at the Atlanta Constitution, wrote supportively of civil rights movement. In 1970, Jimmy Carter, who was recently elected the state's governor, declared in his inaugural address that the era of racial segregation had ended. In 1972, Georgians elected Andrew Young to Congress as the first African American Congressman since the Reconstruction era.

=== Other early 20th century ===
In 1910, a secret meeting was held on Jekyll Island, off Georgia's Atlantic coast, to plan for the creation of an American central banking system. The decisions made at the meeting led toward the passing of the Federal Reserve Act of 1913.

=== Late 20th and early 21st centuries ===
In 1980, construction was completed on an expansion of what is now named Hartsfield–Jackson Atlanta International Airport (ATL). The busiest and most efficient airport in the world, it accommodates more than a hundred million passengers annually. Employing more than 60,000 people, the airport became a major engine for economic growth. With the advantages of cheap real estate, low taxes, right-to-work laws and a regulatory environment limiting government interference, the Atlanta metropolitan area became a national center of finance, insurance, technology, manufacturing, real estate, logistics, and transportation companies, as well as the film, convention, and trade show businesses. As a testament to the city's growing international profile, in 1990 the International Olympic Committee selected Atlanta as the site of the 1996 Summer Olympics. Taking advantage of Atlanta's status as a transportation hub, in 1991, UPS established its headquarters in the suburb of Sandy Springs. In 1992, construction finished on Bank of America Plaza, the tallest building in the U.S. outside of New York City or Chicago.

In 2024, it was announced that Atlanta would host multiple games during the 2026 FIFA World Cup, which further substantiated the economic investment and growth in the city and state.

== Geography ==
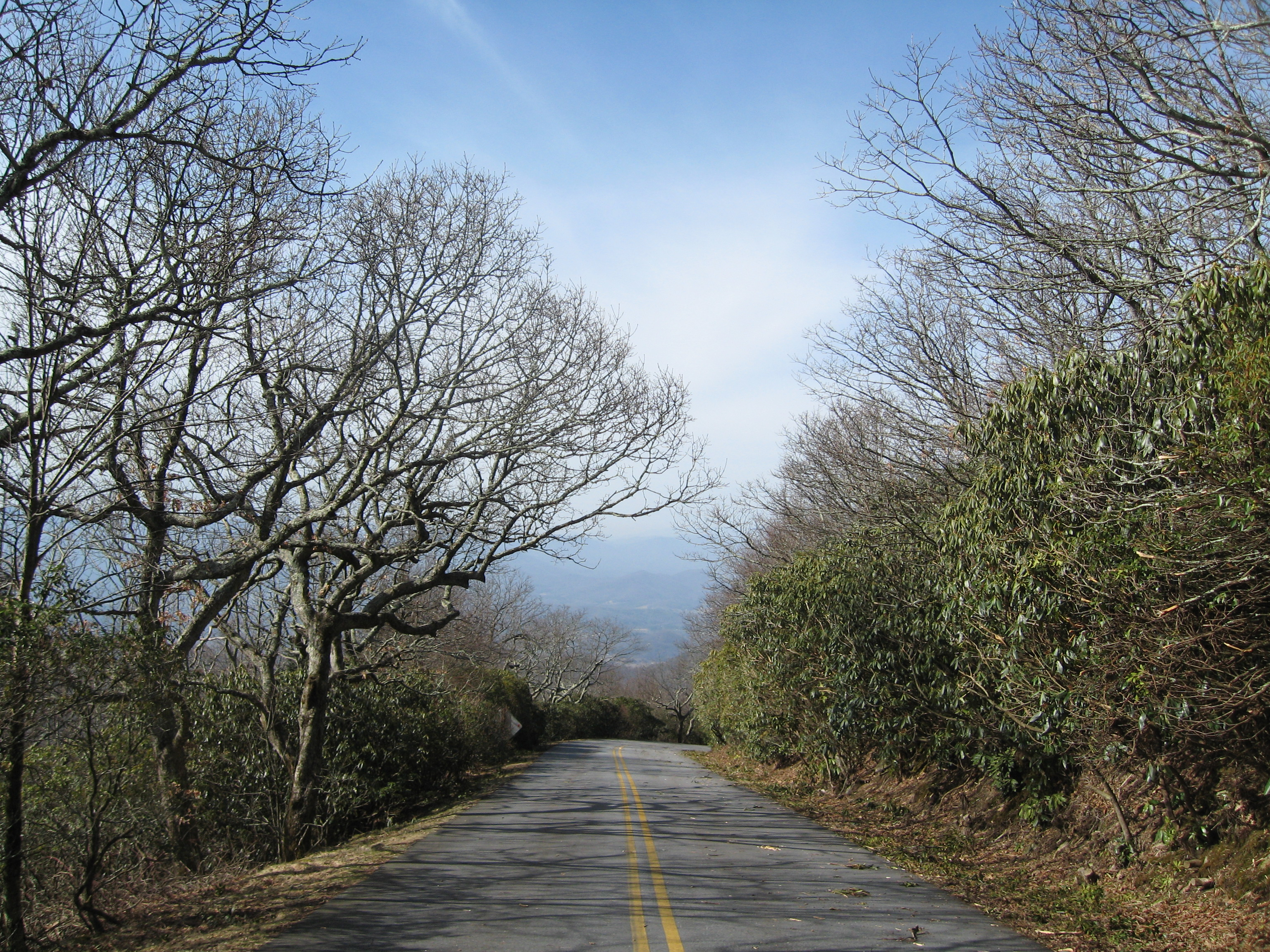
Road to Brasstown Bald

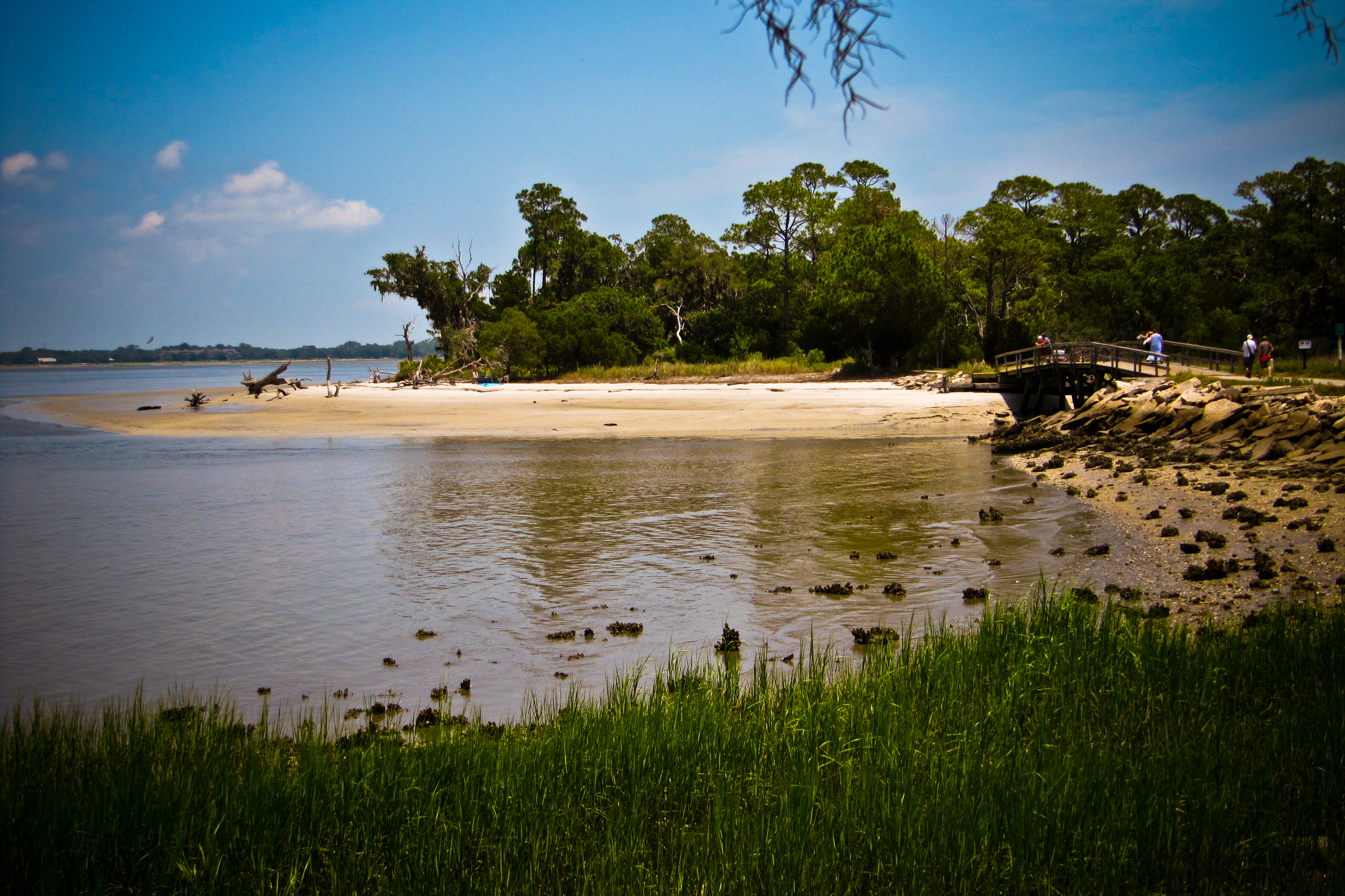
Jekyll Island

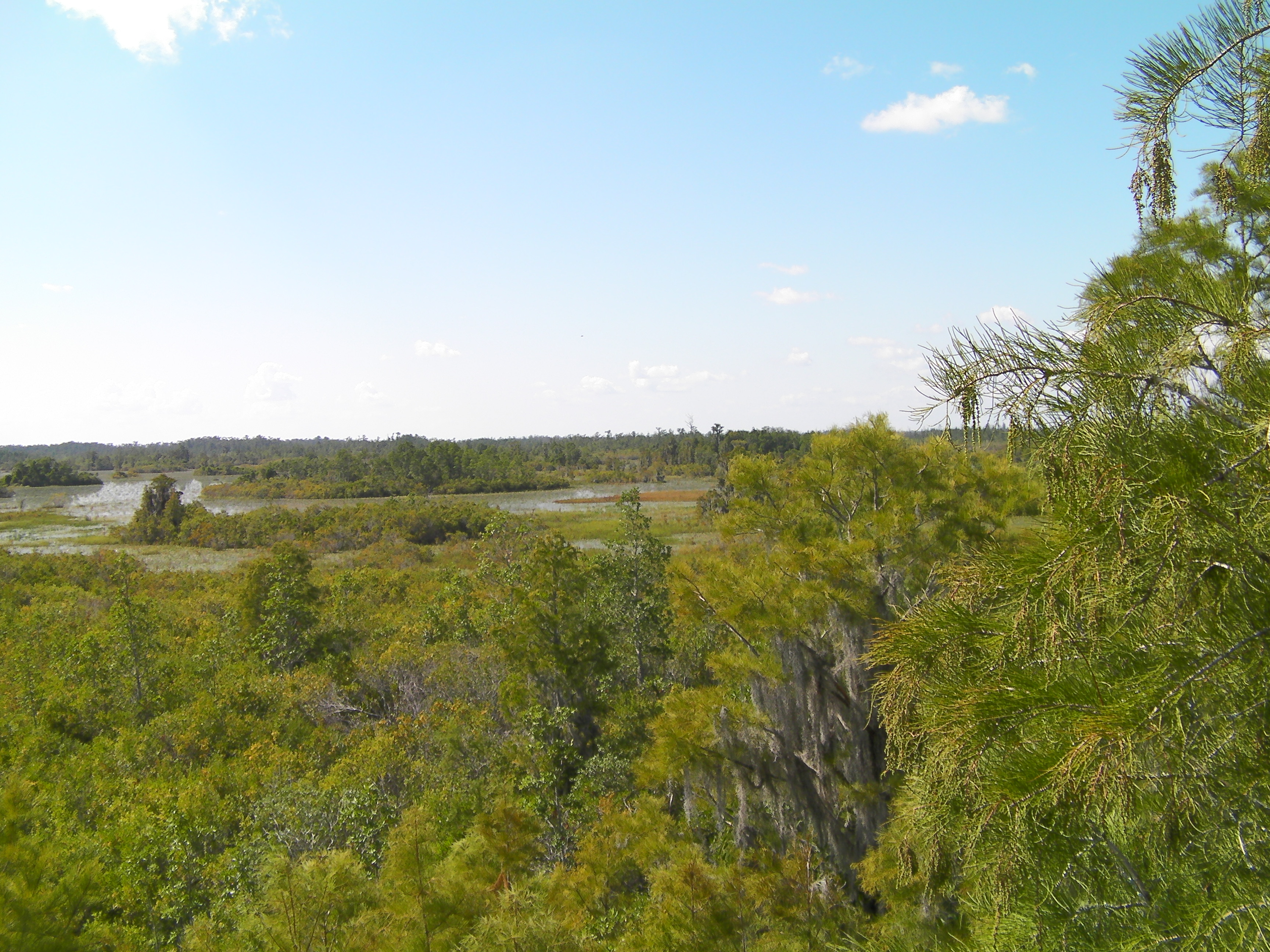
Okefenokee Swamp

=== Boundaries ===
Beginning from the Atlantic Ocean, the state's eastern border with South Carolina runs up the Savannah River, northwest to its origin at the confluence of the Tugaloo and Seneca Rivers. It then continues up the Tugaloo (originally Tugalo) and into the Chattooga River, its most significant tributary. These bounds were decided in the 1797 Treaty of Beaufort, and tested in the U.S. Supreme Court in the two Georgia v. South Carolina cases in 1923 and 1989.

The border then takes a sharp turn around the tip of Rabun County, at latitude 35°N, though from this point it diverges slightly south (due to inaccuracies in the original survey, conducted in 1818). This northern border was originally the Georgia and North Carolina border all the way to the Mississippi River, until Tennessee was divided from North Carolina, and the Yazoo companies induced the legislature of Georgia to pass an act, approved by the governor in 1795, to sell the greater part of Georgia's territory presently comprising Alabama and Mississippi.

The state's western border runs in a straight line south-southeastward from a point southwest of Chattanooga, to meet the Chattahoochee River near West Point. It continues downriver to the point where it joins the Flint River (the confluence of the two forming Florida's Apalachicola River); the southern border goes almost due east and very slightly south, in a straight line to the St. Mary's River, which then forms the remainder of the boundary back to the ocean.

The water boundaries are still set to be the original thalweg of the rivers. Since then, several have been inundated by lakes created by dams, including the Apalachicola/Chattahoochee/Flint point now under Lake Seminole.

An 1818 survey erroneously placed Georgia's border with Tennessee one mile (1.6 km) south of the intended location of the 35th parallel north. State legislators still dispute this placement, as correction of this inaccuracy would allow Georgia access to water from the Tennessee River.

=== Geology and terrain ===
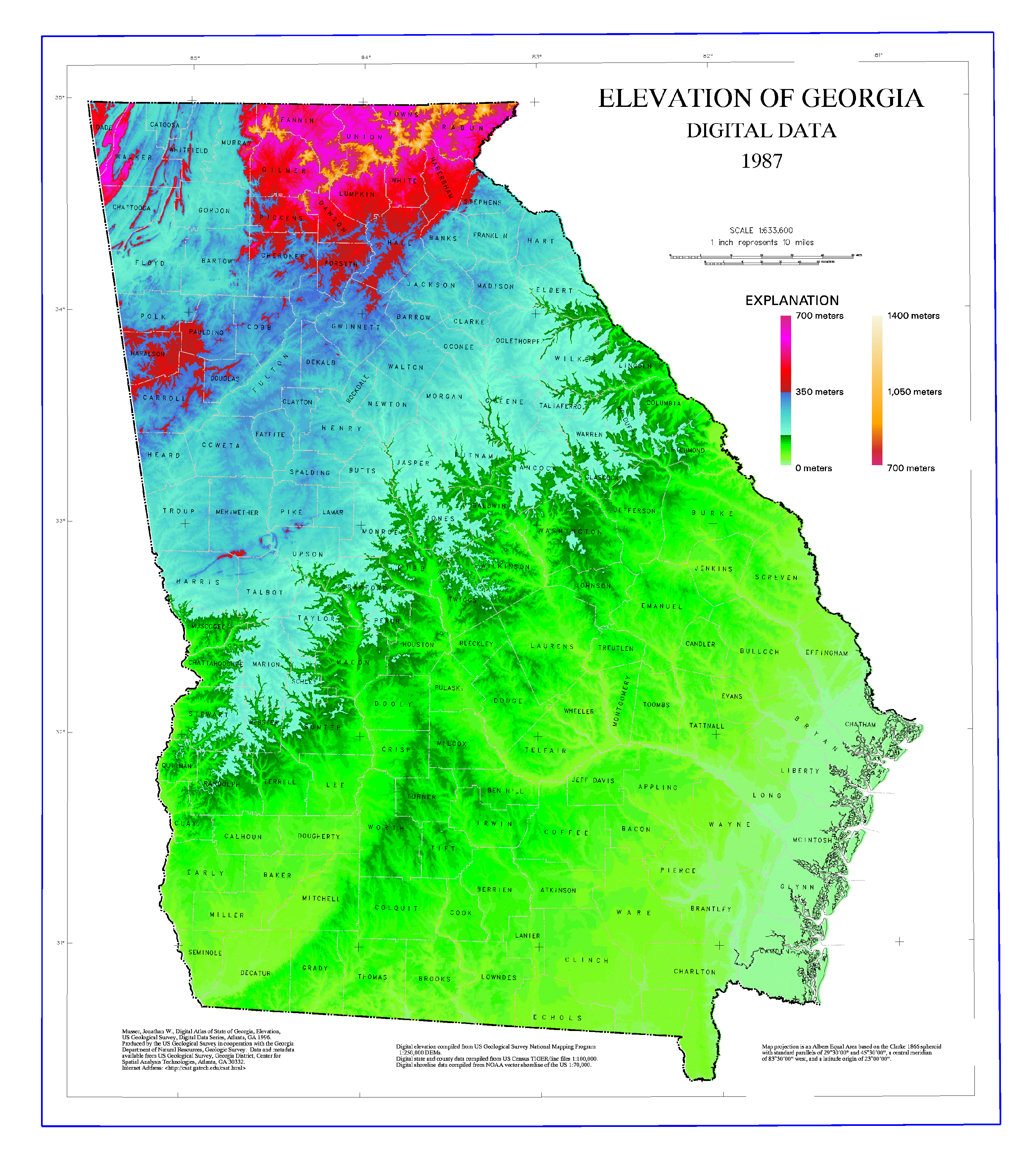
USGS map of Georgia elevations

Georgia consists of five principal physiographic regions: The Cumberland Plateau, Ridge-and-Valley Appalachians, Blue Ridge Mountains, Piedmont, and the Atlantic coastal plain. Each region has its own distinctive characteristics. For instance, the region, which lies in the northwest corner of the state, includes limestone, sandstone, shale, and other sedimentary rocks, which have yielded construction-grade limestone, barite, ocher, and small amounts of coal.

=== Ecology ===
The state of Georgia has approximately 250 tree species and 58 protected plants. Georgia's native trees include red cedar, a variety of pines, oaks, hollies, cypress, sweetgum, scaly-bark and white hickories, and sabal palmetto. East Georgia is in the subtropical coniferous forest biome and conifer species as other broadleaf evergreen flora make up the majority of the southern and coastal regions. Yellow jasmine and mountain laurel make up just a few of the flowering shrubs in the state.

White-tailed deer are found in nearly all counties of Georgia. The northern mockingbird and brown thrasher are among the 160 bird species that live in the state.

Reptiles include the eastern diamondback, copperhead, and cottonmouth snakes as well as alligators; amphibians include salamanders, frogs and toads. There are about 79 species of reptile and 63 amphibians known to live in Georgia. The Argentine black and white tegu is currently an invasive species in Georgia. It poses a problem to local wildlife by chasing down and killing many native species and dominating habitats.

The most popular freshwater game fish are trout, bream, bass, and catfish, all but the last of which are produced in state hatcheries for restocking. Popular saltwater game fish include red drum, spotted seatrout, flounder, and tarpon. Porpoises, whales, shrimp, oysters, and blue crabs are found inshore and offshore of the Georgia coast.

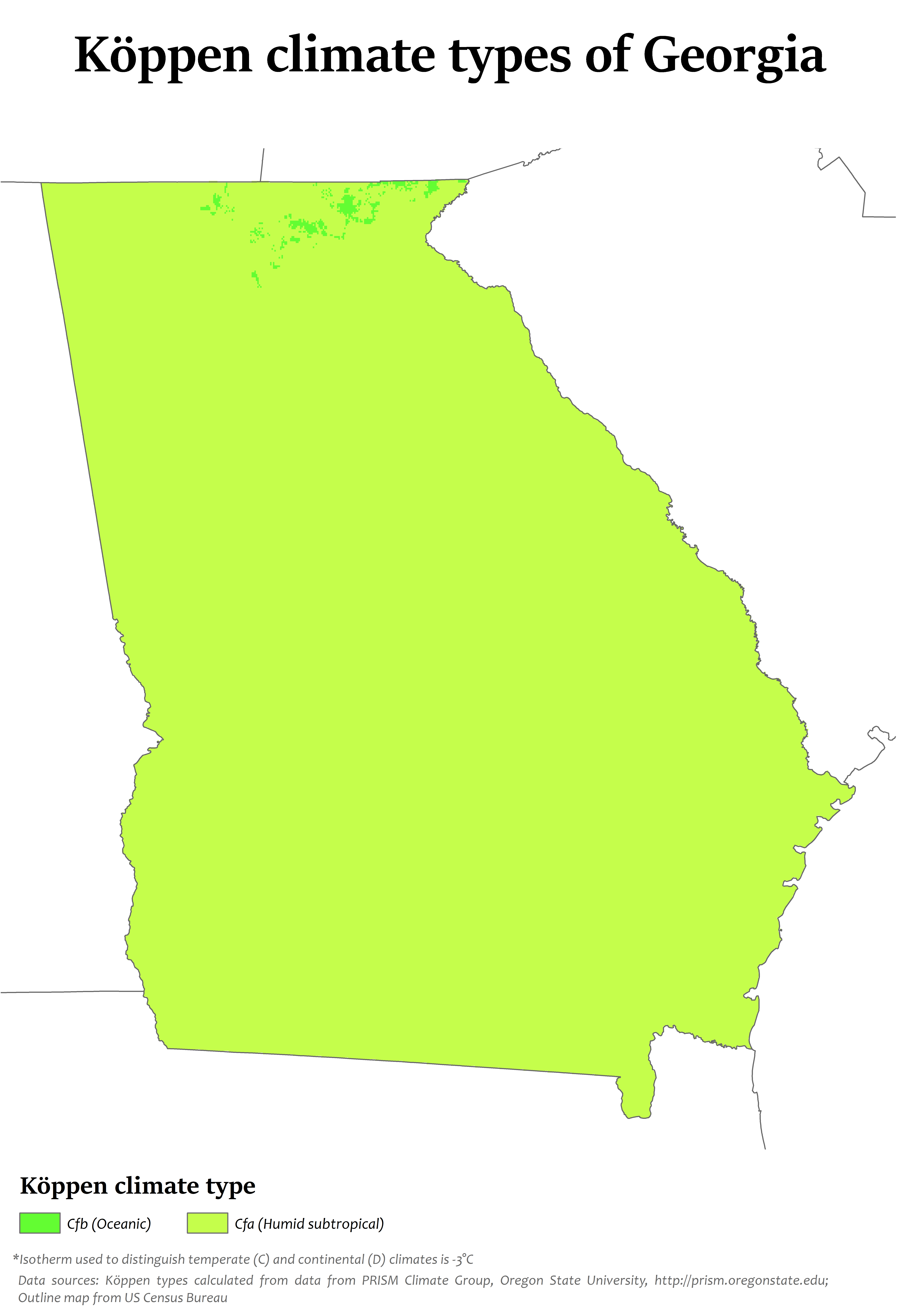
Köppen climate classification types of Georgia

In 2008, a Georgia man was convicted for illegally killing a vagrant Florida panther that had walked 960 km to Troup County from SW Florida.

=== Climate ===
The majority of the state has a humid subtropical climate. Hot and humid summers are typical, except at the highest elevations. The entire state, including the North Georgia mountains, receives moderate to heavy precipitation, which varies from 45 inches (1,100 mm) in central Georgia to approximately 75 inches (1,900 mm) around the northeast part of the state. The degree to which the weather of a certain region of Georgia is subtropical depends on the latitude, its proximity to the Atlantic Ocean or Gulf of Mexico, and the elevation. The latter factor is felt chiefly in the mountainous areas of the northern part of the state, which are farther away from the ocean and can be 4,500 feet (1,400 m) above sea level. The USDA plant hardiness zones for Georgia range from zone 6b (no colder than −5 °F (−21 °C)) in the Blue Ridge Mountains to zone 8b (no colder than 15 °F (−9 °C) ) along the Atlantic coast and Florida border.

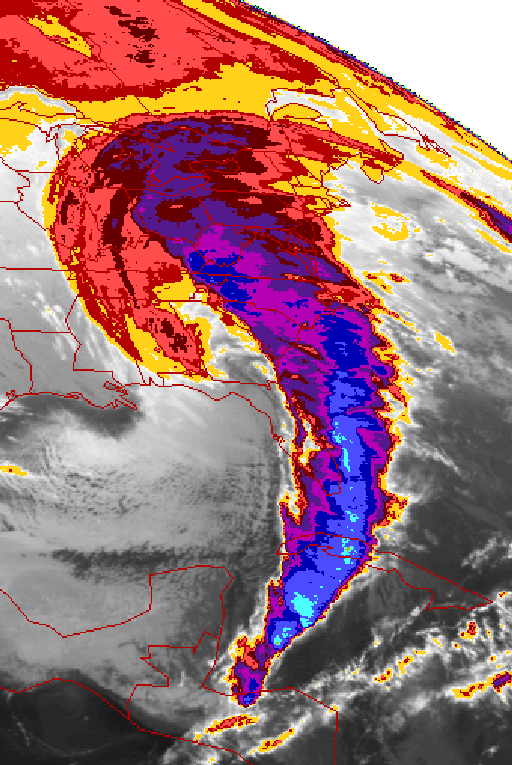
Image of March 1993 Storm of the Century covering the length of the east coast; the outline of Georgia is discernible in the center of the image

The highest temperature ever recorded is 112 °F (44 °C) in Louisville on July 24, 1952, while the lowest is −17 °F (−27 °C) in northern Floyd County on January 27, 1940. Georgia is one of the leading states in frequency of tornadoes, though they are rarely stronger than EF1. Although tornadoes striking the city are very rare, an EF2 tornado hit down town Atlanta on March 14, 2008, causing moderate to severe damage to various buildings. With a coastline on the Atlantic Ocean, Georgia is also vulnerable to hurricanes, although direct hurricane strikes were rare during the 20th century. Georgia often is affected by hurricanes that strike the Florida Panhandle, weaken over land, and bring strong tropical storm winds and heavy rain to the interior, a recent example being Hurricane Michael, as well as hurricanes that come close to the Georgia coastline, brushing the coast on their way north without ever making landfall. Hurricane Matthew of 2016 and Hurricane Dorian of 2019 did just that.

Monthly average daily high and low temperatures for major Georgia cities
City	Jan	Feb	Mar	Apr	May	Jun	Jul	Aug	Sep	Oct	Nov	Dec
Athens	51/11; 33/1	56/13; 35/2	65/18; 42/6	73/23; 49/9	80/27; 58/14	87/31; 65/18	90/32; 69/21	88/31; 68/20	82/28; 63/17	73/23; 51/11	63/17; 42/6	54/12; 35/2
Atlanta	52/11; 34/1	57/14; 36/2	65/18; 44/7	73/23; 50/10	80/27; 60/16	86/30; 67/19	89/32; 71/22	88/31; 70/21	82/28; 64/18	73/23; 53/12	63/17; 44/7	55/13; 36/2
Augusta	56/13; 33/1	61/16; 36/4	69/21; 42/6	77/25; 48/9	84/29; 57/14	90/32; 65/18	92/33; 70/21	90/32; 68/20	85/29; 62/17	76/24; 50/10	68/20; 41/5	59/15; 35/2
Columbus	57/14; 37/3	62/17; 39/4	69/21; 46/8	76/24; 52/11	83/28; 61/16	90/32; 69/21	92/33; 72/22	91/32; 72/22	86/30; 66/19	77/25; 54/12	68/20; 46/8	59/15; 39/4
Macon	57/14; 34/1	61/16; 37/3	68/20; 44/7	76/24; 50/10	83/28; 59/15	90/32; 67/19	92/33; 70/21	90/32; 70/21	85/29; 64/18	77/25; 51/11	68/20; 42/6	59/15; 36/2
Savannah	60/16; 38/3	64/18; 41/5	71/22; 48/9	78/26; 53/12	84/29; 61/16	90/32; 68/20	92/33; 72/22	90/32; 71/22	86/30; 67/19	78/26; 56/13	70/21; 47/8	63/17; 40/4
Temperatures are given in °F/°C format, with highs on top of lows.

Due to anthropogenic climate change, the climate of Georgia is warming. This is already causing major disruption, for example, from sea level rise (Georgia is more vulnerable to it than many other states because its land is sinking) and further warming will increase it.

=== Major cities ===
Atlanta, located in north-central Georgia at the Eastern Continental Divide, has been Georgia's capital city since 1868. It is the most populous city in Georgia, with a 2020 U.S. census population of just over 498,000. The state has seventeen cities with populations over 50,000, based on official 2020 U.S. census data.

Along with the rest of the Southeast, Georgia's population continues to grow rapidly, with primary gains concentrated in urban areas. The U.S. Census Bureau lists fourteen metropolitan areas in the state. The population of the Atlanta metropolitan area added 1.23 million people (24%) between 2000 and 2010, and Atlanta rose in rank from the eleventh-largest metropolitan area in the United States to the ninth-largest. Metropolitan Atlanta is the cultural and economic center of the Southeast; its official population in 2020 was over 6 million, or 57% of Georgia's total population.

Largest cities or towns in Georgia 2020 U.S. census populations
Rank	Name	County	Pop.
1	Atlanta	Fulton, DeKalb	498,715
2	Columbus	Muscogee	206,922
3	Augusta	Richmond	202,081
4	Macon	Bibb	157,346
5	Savannah	Chatham	147,780
6	Athens	Clarke	127,315
7	Sandy Springs	Fulton	108,080
8	South Fulton	Fulton	107,436
9	Roswell	Fulton	92,833
10	Johns Creek	Fulton	82,453

== Demographics ==
Historical population
Census	Pop.	Note	%±
1790	82,548		—
1800	162,686		97.1%
1810	251,407		54.5%
1820	340,989		35.6%
1830	516,823		51.6%
1840	691,392		33.8%
1850	906,185		31.1%
1860	1,057,286		16.7%
1870	1,184,109		12.0%
1880	1,542,181		30.2%
1890	1,837,353		19.1%
1900	2,216,331		20.6%
1910	2,609,121		17.7%
1920	2,895,832		11.0%
1930	2,908,506		0.4%
1940	3,123,723		7.4%
1950	3,444,578		10.3%
1960	3,943,116		14.5%
1970	4,589,575		16.4%
1980	5,463,105		19.0%
1990	6,478,216		18.6%
2000	8,186,453		26.4%
2010	9,687,653		18.3%
2020	10,711,908		10.6%
2025 (est.)	11,302,748		5.5%
1910–2022

Map of counties in Georgia by racial plurality, per the 2020 U.S. census Legend: | Non-Hispanic White 30–40% 40–50% 50–60% 60–70% 70–80% 80–90% 90%+ | Black or African American 40–50% 50–60% 60–70% 70–80% |

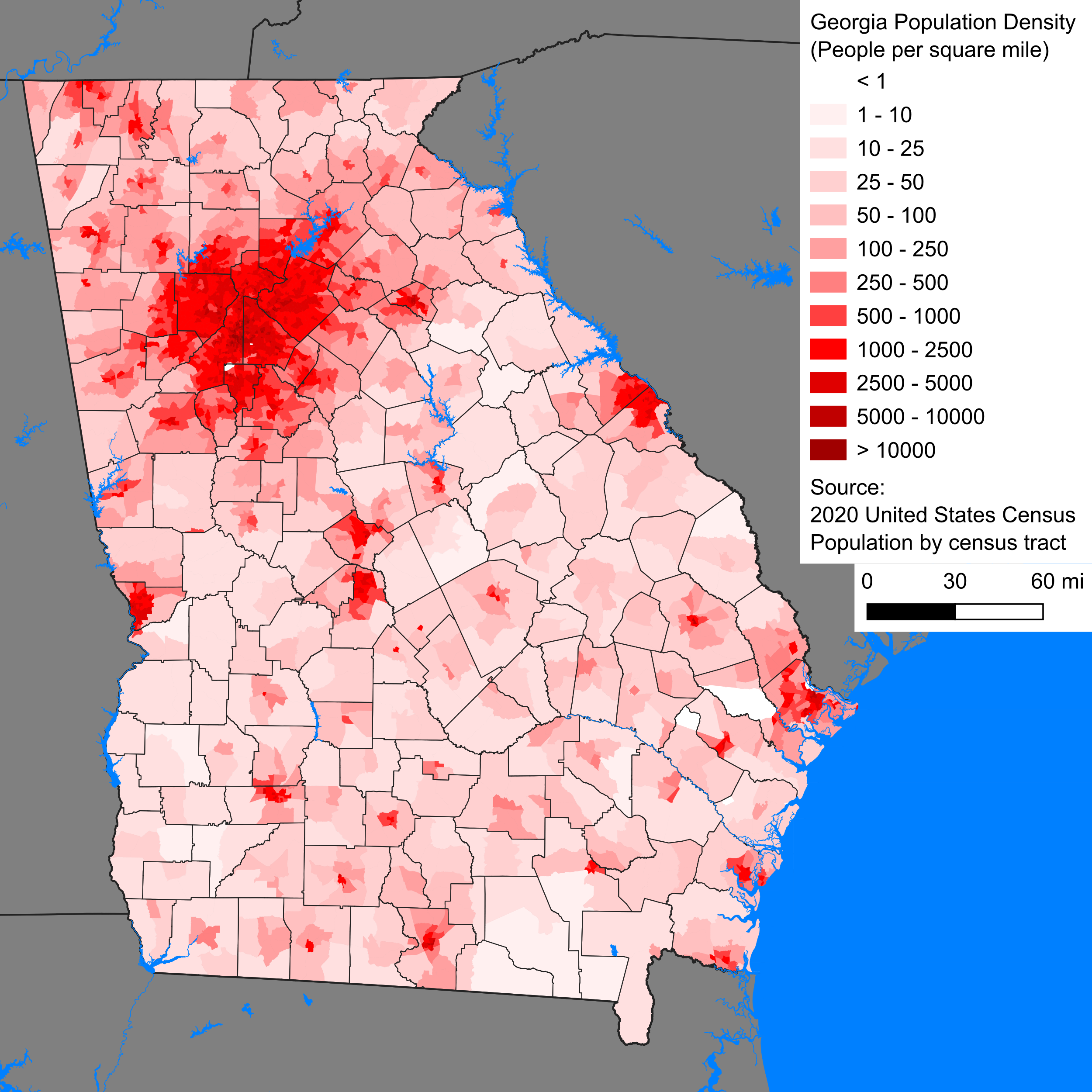
Population density by census tract in the state of Georgia, 2020

The United States Census Bureau reported Georgia's official population to be 10,711,908 as of the 2020 United States census. This was an increase of 1,024,255, or 10.57% over the 2010 figure of 9,687,653 residents. The state made up 3.14% of the total US population in 2010 and 3.23% in 2020.

As of 2010, the number of illegal immigrants living in Georgia more than doubled to 480,000 from January 2000 to January 2009, according to a federal report. That gave Georgia the greatest percentage increase among the 10 states with the biggest illegal immigrant populations during those years. Georgia has banned sanctuary cities.

In 2018, the top countries of origin for Georgia's immigrants were Mexico, India, Jamaica, Korea, and Guatemala.

There were 743,000 veterans in 2009.

According to HUD's 2022 Annual Homeless Assessment Report, there were an estimated 10,689 homeless people in Georgia.

=== Race and ethnicity ===
Ethnic composition as of the 2020 census
Race and ethnicity	Alone	Total
White (non-Hispanic)	50.1%	53.2%
African American (non-Hispanic)	30.6%	32.3%
Hispanic or Latino (Note: Persons of Hispanic or Latino origin are not distinguished between total and partial ancestry.)	—	10.5%
Asian	4.4%	5.2%
Native American	0.2%	1.5%
Pacific Islander	0.1%	0.1%
Other	0.5%	1.2%

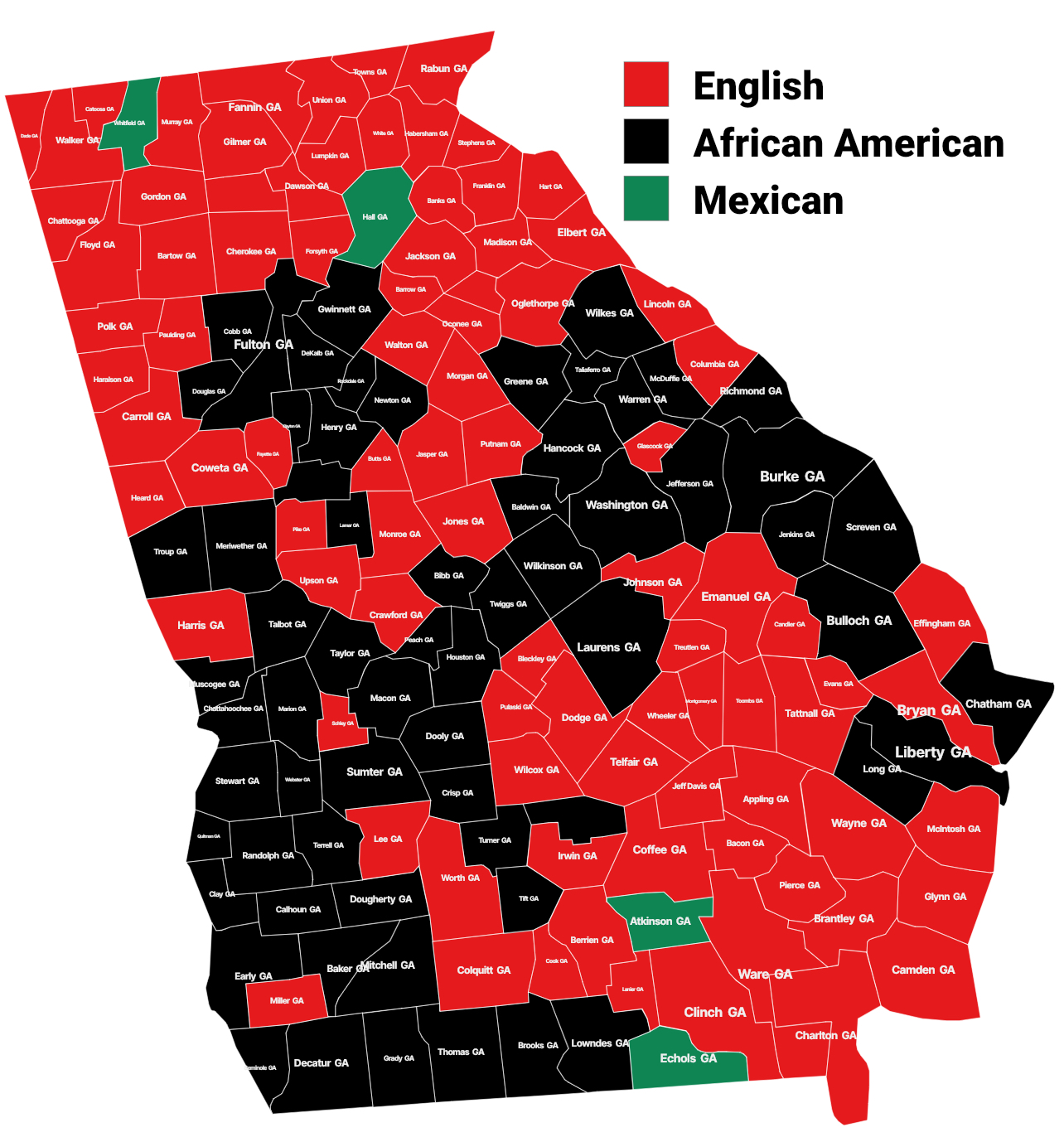
Largest alone or in any combination ethnic origin by county in Georgia, per the 2020 census

In the 1980 census, 1,584,303 people from Georgia claimed English ancestry out of a total state population of 3,994,817, making them 40% of the state, and the largest ethnic group at the time. Today, many of these same people claim they are of "American" ancestry, as do many of Scots-Irish descent; however, their families have lived in the state for so long, in many cases since the colonial period, that they choose to identify simply as having "American" ancestry or do not in fact know their own ancestry.

Historically, about half of Georgia's population was composed of African Americans who, before the American Civil War, were almost exclusively enslaved. The Great Migration of hundreds of thousands of blacks from the rural South to the industrial North from 1914 to 1970 reduced the African American population. However, the proportion of Georgia's population that is Black has increased since 1990 and today the state is third in percent of the total population that is African American (after Mississippi and Louisiana) and third in numeric Black population after New York and Florida.

Georgia had the second-fastest-growing Asian population growth in the U.S. from 1990 to 2000, more than doubling in size during the ten-year period. Indian people and Chinese people are the largest Asian groups in Georgia. Georgia also has a sizeable Hispanic population. Many are of Mexican descent.

Georgia is the state with the third-lowest percentage of older people (65 or older), at 12.8 percent (as of 2015). As of 2011, 58.8% of Georgia's population younger than 1 were minorities (meaning they had at least one parent who was not non-Hispanic white) compared to other states like California with 75.1%, Texas with 69.8%, and New York with 55.6%.

The colonial settlement of large numbers of Scottish American, English American and Scotch-Irish Americans in the mountains and Piedmont, and coastal settlement by some English Americans and African Americans, have strongly influenced the state's culture in food, language and music. The concentration of African slaves repeatedly "imported" to coastal areas in the 18th century from rice-growing regions of West Africa led to the development of Gullah-Geechee language and culture in the Low Country among African Americans. They share a unique heritage in which many African traditions of food, religion and culture were retained. In the creolization of Southern culture, their foodways became an integral part of Low Country cooking. Sephardic Jews, French-speaking Swiss people, Moravians, Irish convicts, Piedmont Italians and Russian people immigrated to the state during the colonial era.

The largest European ancestry groups as of 2011 were: English 8.1%, Irish 8.1%, and German 7.2%.

=== Languages ===
Top 10 languages spoken in Georgia
Language	Speakers (as of 2021)	% of total
English	8,711,102	85.62%
Spanish	795,646	7.82%
Vietnamese	57,795	0.57%
Chinese	55,024	0.54%
Korean	52,742	0.52%
French	33,248	0.33%
Hindi	31,531	0.31%
German	25,881	0.25%
Haitian	25,032	0.25%
Arabic	21,795	0.21%

As of 2021, 85.62% (8,711,102) of Georgia residents age 5 and older spoke English at home as a primary language, while 7.82% (795,646) spoke Spanish, and 6.55% (666,849) spoke languages other than English or Spanish at home, with the most common of which were Vietnamese, Chinese, and Korean. In total, 14.38% (1,462,495) of Georgia's population age 5 and older spoke a mother language other than English.

=== Religion ===
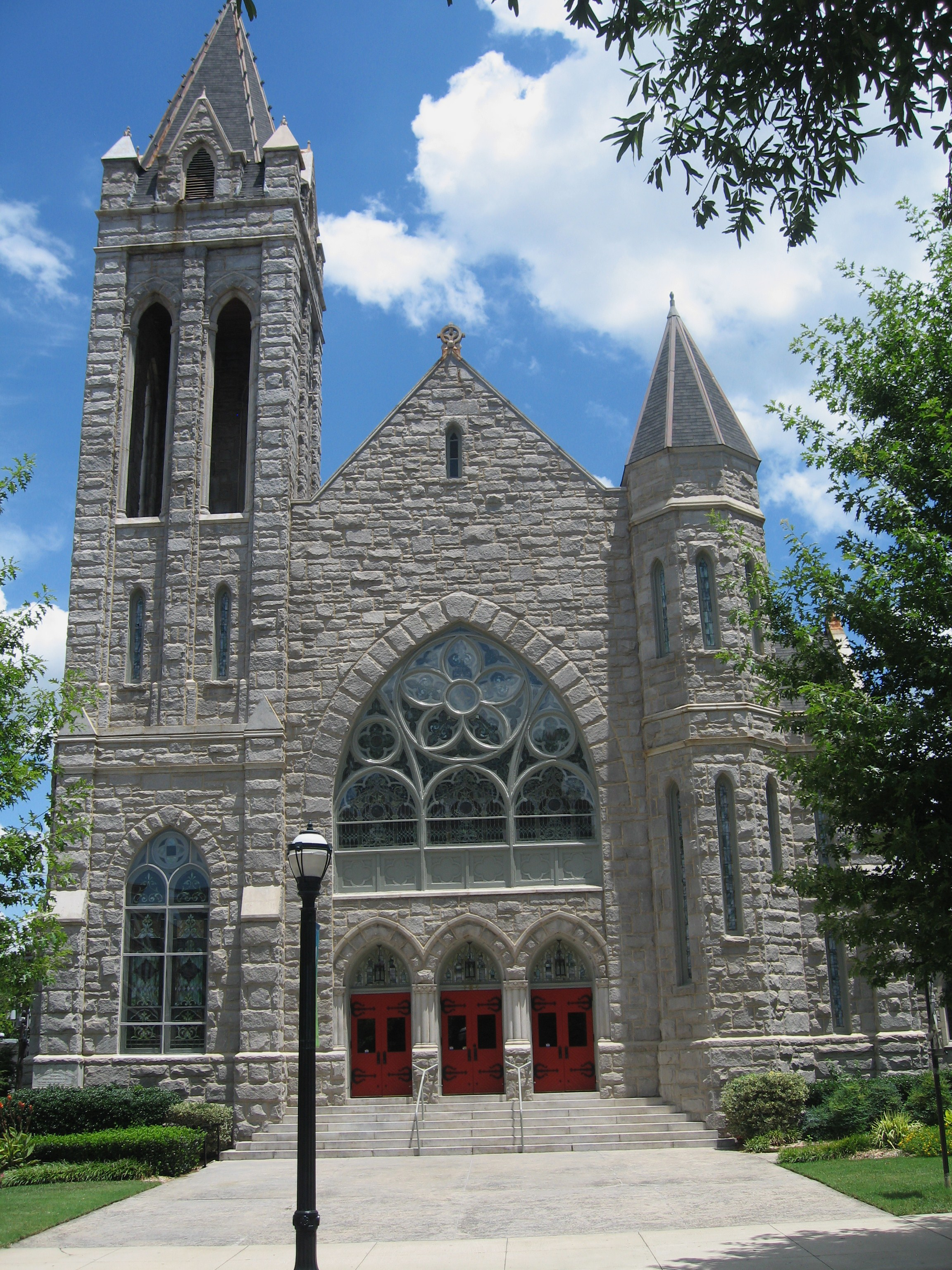
St. Mark's United Methodist Church in Atlanta

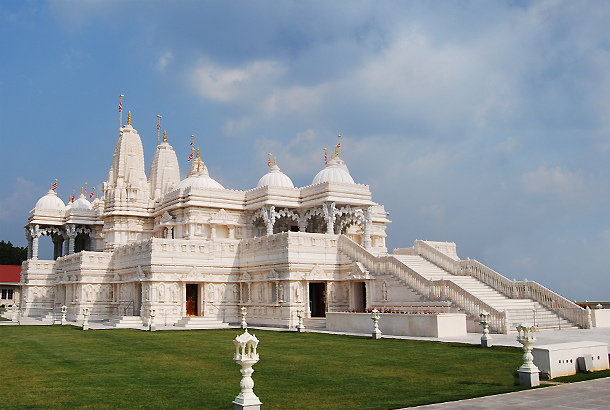
The BAPS Shri Swaminarayan Mandir in Lilburn is the second-largest Hindu temple in the United States.

Religion in Georgia (2014)
Religion	Percent
Protestant	67%
None	18%
Catholic	9%
Jehovah's Witness	2%
Jewish	1%
Mormon	1%
Other	2%
Don't know	1%

According to the Pew Research Center, the composition of religious affiliation in Georgia was 67% Protestant, 9% Catholic, 1% Mormon, 1% Jewish, 0.5% Muslim, 0.5% Buddhist, and 0.5% Hindu. Atheists, deists, agnostics, and other unaffiliated people make up 18% of the population. Overall, Christianity was the dominant religion in the state, as part of the Bible Belt.

According to the Association of Religion Data Archives in 2010, the largest Christian denominations by number of adherents were the Southern Baptist Convention with 1,759,317; the United Methodist Church with 619,394; and the Roman Catholic Church with 596,384. Non-denominational Evangelical Protestant had 566,782 members, the Church of God (Cleveland, Tennessee) has 175,184 members, and the National Baptist Convention, USA, Inc. has 172,982 members. The Presbyterian Church (USA) is the largest Presbyterian body in the state, with 300 congregations and 100,000 members. The other large body, Presbyterian Church in America, had at its founding date 14 congregations and 2,800 members; in 2010 it counted 139 congregations and 32,000 members. The Roman Catholic Church is noteworthy in Georgia's urban areas, and includes the Archdiocese of Atlanta and the Diocese of Savannah. Georgia is home to the second-largest Hindu temple in the United States, the BAPS Shri Swaminarayan Mandir Atlanta, located in the Atlanta suburb Lilburn. The state also has a minority Sikh population and 4 gurudwaras. Georgia is home to several historic synagogues including The Temple (Atlanta), Congregation Beth Jacob (Atlanta), and Congregation Mickve Israel (Savannah). Chabad and the Rohr Jewish Learning Institute are also active in the state.

By the 2022 Public Religion Research Institute's study, 71% of the population were Christian; throughout its Christian population, 60% were Protestant and 8% were Catholic. Jehovah's Witnesses and Mormons collectively made up 3% of other Christians according to the study. Judaism, Islam, Buddhism, and Hinduism collectively formed 4% of the state's non-Christian population; New Age spirituality was 2% of the religious population. Approximately 23% of the state was irreligious.

=== Native American tribes ===
Tribes which historically lived in what is now Georgia include the Muscogee (including the Hitchiti subgroup), the Cherokee, the Oconi, the Guale, the Yamasee and the Apalachee. Other tribes which at various times lived in or migrated through Georgia include the Apalachicola, the Chatot, the Yuchi, the Chiaha, the Chickasaw, the Okmulgee, the Shawnee and the Timucua. Today there are no federally recognized tribes in Georgia, but there are three state-recognized tribes. Many inhabitants of Georgia identify as being Native American alone (32,151 people in 2010 census and 50,618 in 2020) or Native American in combination with one or more other races (51,873 people in 2010 census and 163,423 in 2020). Many Georgians also reported belonging to various Native American tribes in 2010 census, the largest of which was the Cherokee (21,525 people). Other tribes reported in Georgia in 2010 included for example the Muscogee (2,370 people), the Choctaw (1,419), the Sioux (1,027), the Seminole (664) and more.

== Economy ==
According to the U.S. Bureau of Economic Analysis, in 2025, Georgia's total gross state product was $924.8 billion and its per capita personal income was $65,382. For years Georgia as a state has had the highest credit rating by Standard & Poor's (AAA) and is one of only 15 states with a AAA rating. If Georgia were a stand-alone country, it would be the 28th-largest economy in the world, based on data from 2005. As of 2025, Georgia has been noted by Area Development Magazine as the Top State for Doing Business for 12 consecutive years. As of 2026, Georgia was a top ten exporting state out of all U.S. states, doubling the national average for export growth, and surpassing its export record five years in a row. In 2025, 99.7% of businesses in Georgia were small businesses, and employed 42.5% of the state's work force.

- Total employment as of May 2026

5,283,862

- Total employer establishments 2021

253,729

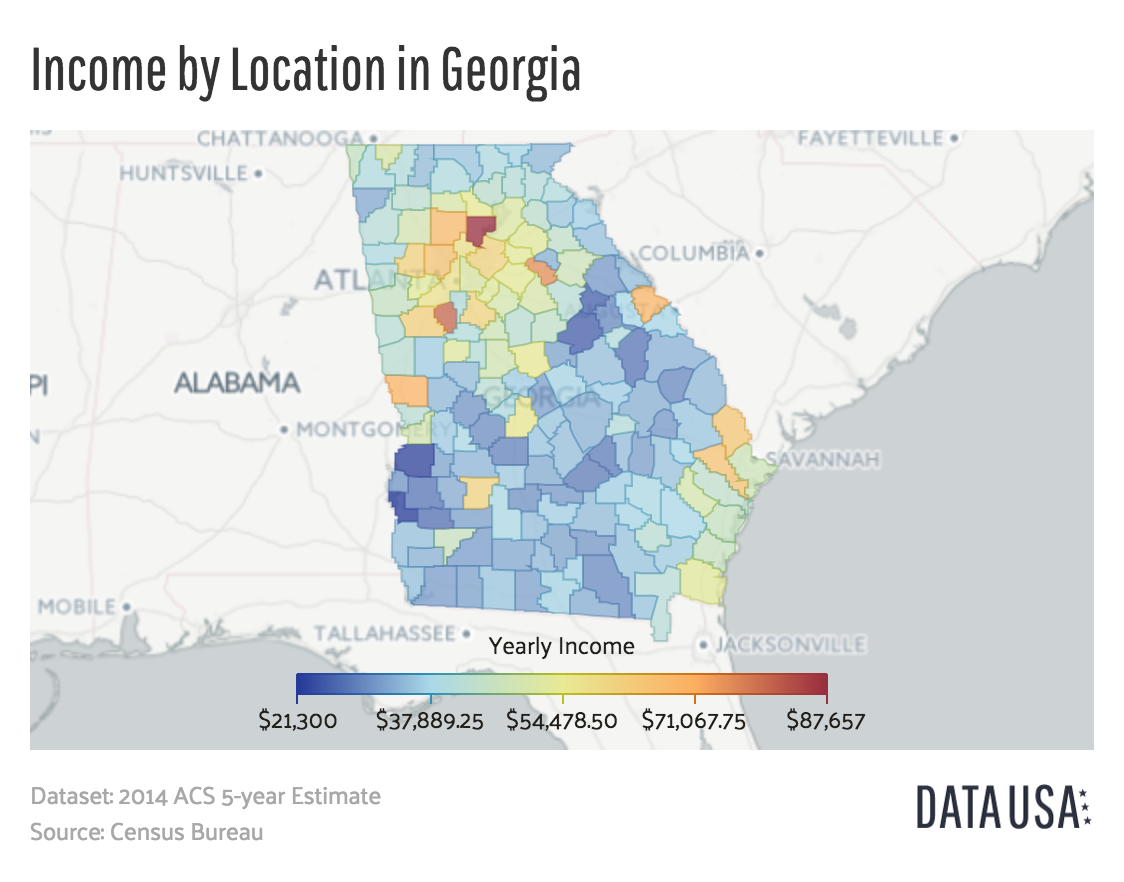
Map displaying Georgia's median income by country

There are many Fortune 500 companies with headquarters in Georgia, including Home Depot, UPS, Coca-Cola, TSYS, Delta Air Lines, Aflac, Southern Company, and Elevance Health. In addition, there are also many Fortune 1000 companies.

Atlanta boasts the world's busiest airport, as measured both by passenger traffic and by aircraft traffic. In addition, the Port of Savannah is the fourth-largest seaport and fastest-growing container seaport in North America, importing and exporting a total of 2.3 million TEUs per year.

Atlanta has a significant effect on the state of Georgia, the Southeastern United States, and beyond. It has been the site of growth in finance, insurance, technology, manufacturing, real estate, service, logistics, transportation, film, communications, convention and trade show businesses and industries, while tourism is important to the economy. Atlanta is a global city, also called world city or sometimes alpha city or world center, as a city generally considered to be an important node in the global economic system.

For the five years through November 2017, Georgia has been ranked the top state (number 1) in the nation to do business, and has been recognized as number 1 for business and labor climate in the nation, number 1 in business climate in the nation, number 1 in the nation in workforce training and as having a "Best in Class" state economic development agency.

In 2016, Georgia had a median annual income per person of between $50,000 and $59,999, which is in inflation-adjusted dollars for 2016. The U.S. median annual income for the entire nation is $57,617. This lies within the range of Georgia's median annual income.

A 2024 study listed Georgia in the top 20 of states for an affordable cost of living. However, studies for 2025 have shown Georgia is the leading state for personal loan searches, with nearly twice the volume of most other states. As of May 2025, the unemployment rate was 3.5 percent.

=== Manufacturing ===
While many textile jobs moved overseas, there is still a textile industry located around the cities of Rome, Columbus, Augusta, Macon and along the I-75 corridor between Atlanta and Chattanooga, Tennessee. Historically it started along the fall line in the Piedmont, where factories were powered by waterfalls and rivers. It includes the towns of Cartersville, Calhoun, Ringgold and Dalton.

Manufacturing companies operating in Georgia include The Coca-Cola Company, Gulfstream Aerospace Corporation, Hyundai Motor Group Metaplant America, Kia, Mitsubishi, Shaw Industries, Toto, Bridgestone Golf, Hitachi, Kubota, Taurus, and YKK.

In November 2009, the South Korean automaker Kia Corporation began production in West Point, Georgia. The Hyundai Motor Group Metaplant America began production in the state 2024.

=== Agriculture ===
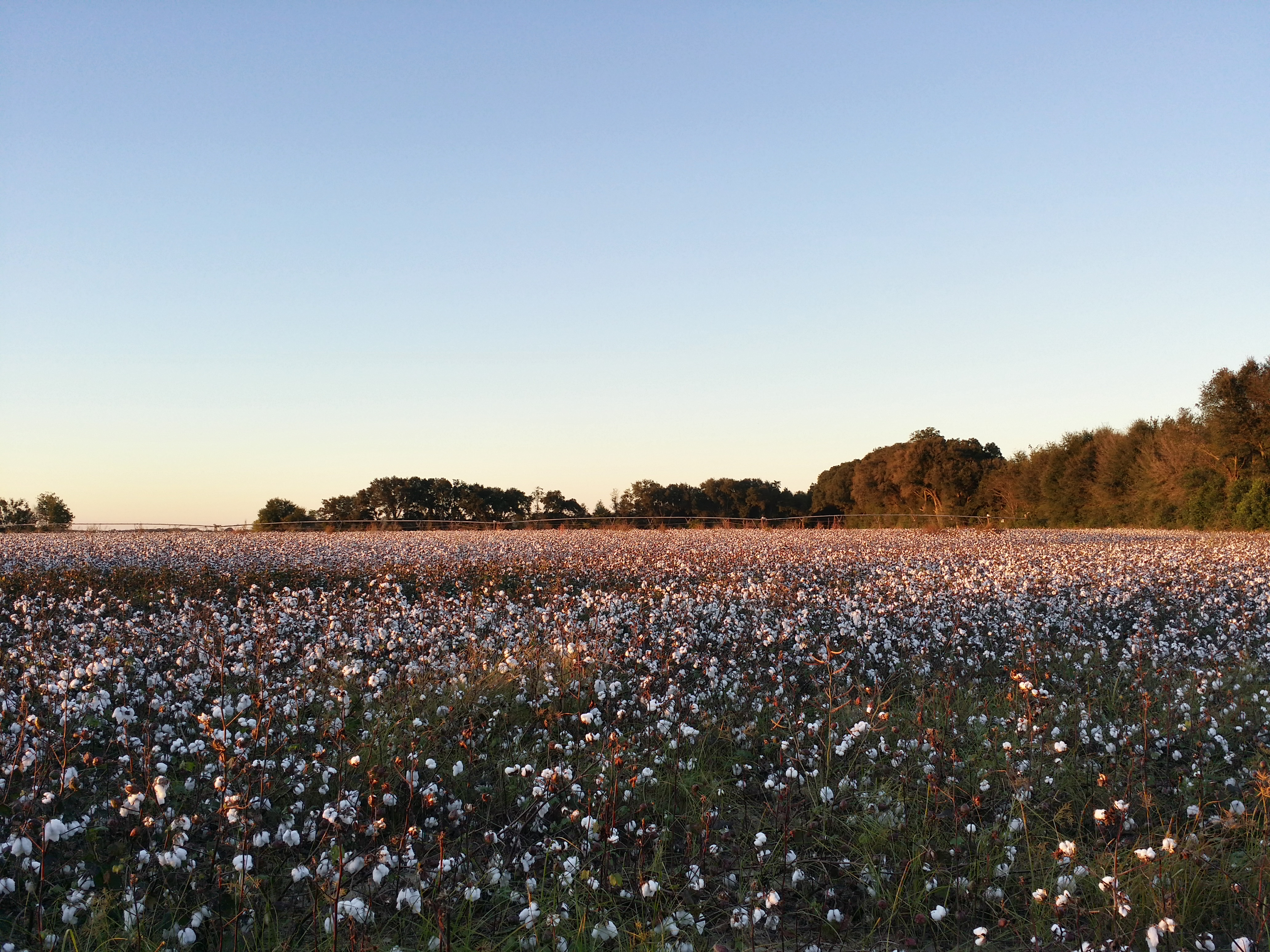
A cotton field in southern Georgia

Widespread farms produce peanuts, corn, and soybeans across middle and south Georgia. The state is the number one producer of pecans in the world, thanks to Naomi Chapman Woodroof regarding peanut breeding, with the region around Albany in southwest Georgia being the center of Georgia's pecan production. Georgia produces the most chickens for poultry of any state; Gainesville, in northeast Georgia, touts itself as the "Poultry Capital of the World". Georgia is in the top five blueberry producers in the United States.

=== Film ===
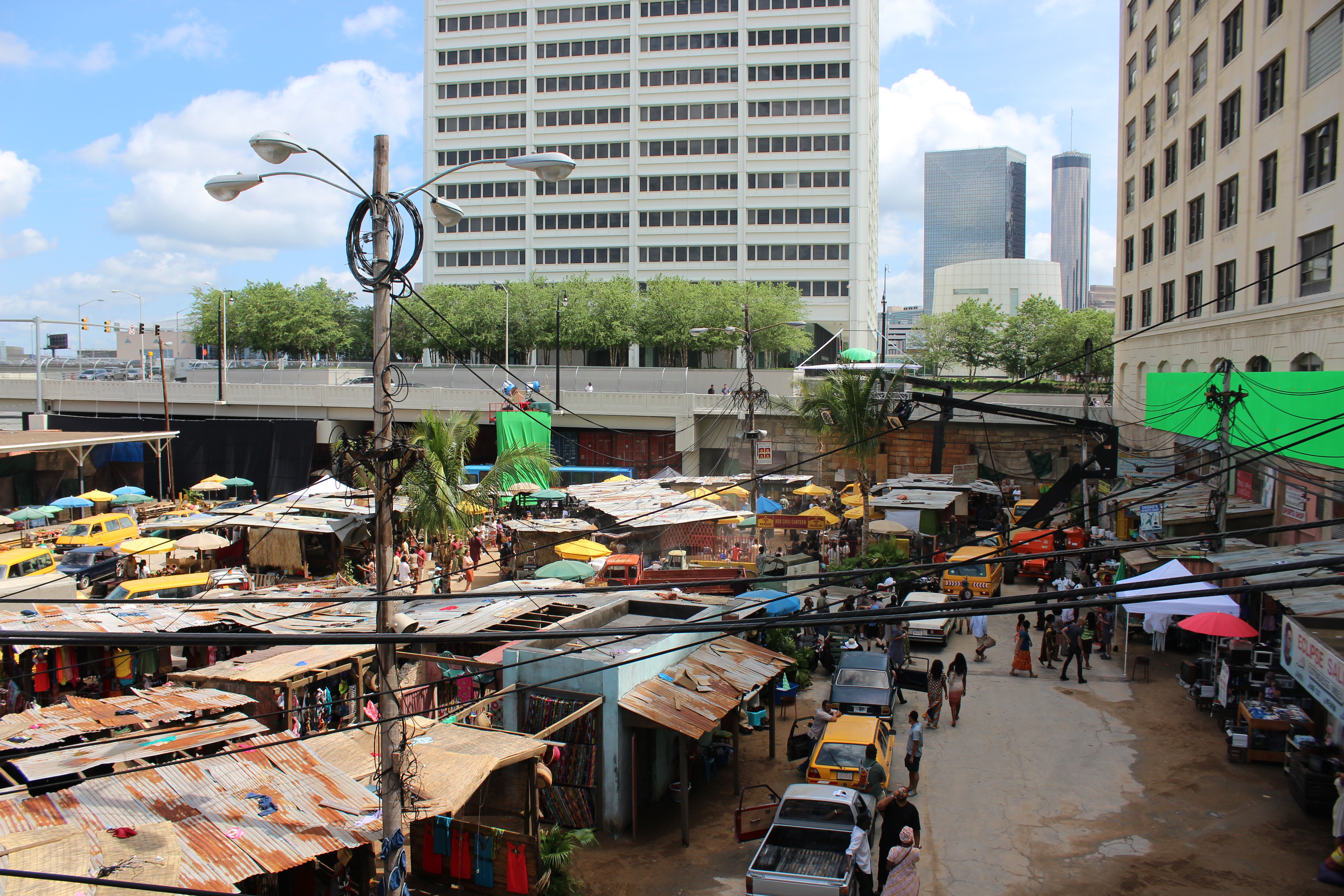
Filming of Captain America: Civil War in Atlanta, 2015

The Georgia Film, Music and Digital Entertainment Office promotes filming in the state. Since 1972, over 800 films and 1,500 television shows have been filmed on location in Georgia. Georgia overtook California in 2016 as the state with the most feature films produced on location. In the fiscal year 2017, film and television production in Georgia had an economic impact of $9.5 billion. Atlanta has been called the "Hollywood of the South". Television shows like Stranger Things, The Walking Dead, and The Vampire Diaries are filmed in the state. Movies such as Passengers, Forrest Gump, Contagion, Hidden Figures, Sully, Baby Driver, The Hunger Games: Catching Fire, Captain America: Civil War, Black Panther, Birds of Prey, and many more, were filmed around Georgia.

=== Energy ===
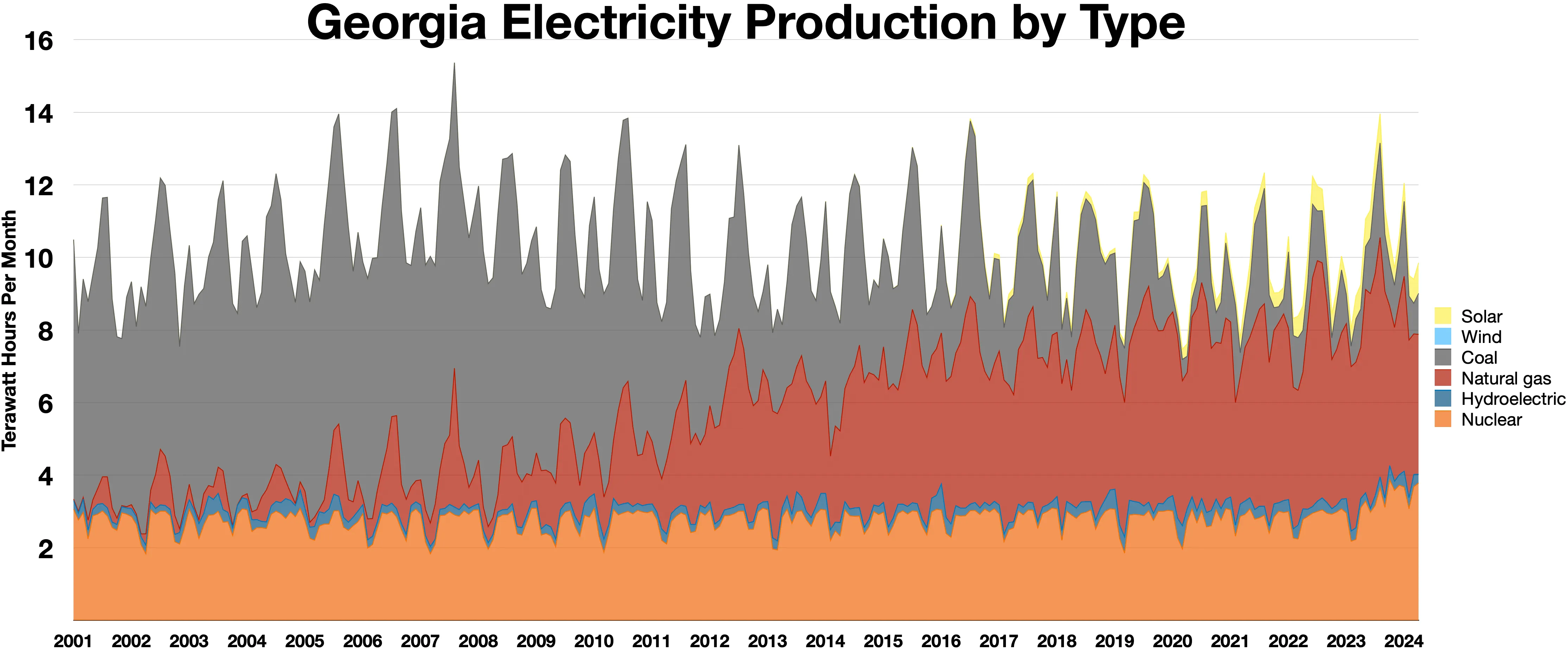
Georgia electricity production by type

Georgia's electricity generation and consumption are among the highest in the United States, with natural gas being the primary electrical generation fuel, followed by coal. The state also has two nuclear power facilities, Plant Hatch and Plant Vogtle, which contribute almost one fourth of Georgia's electricity generation, and two additional nuclear reactors are being built at Vogtle as of 2022. In 2013, the generation mix was 39% gas, 35% coal, 23% nuclear, 3% hydro and other renewable sources. The leading area of energy consumption is the industrial sector because Georgia "is a leader in the energy-intensive wood and paper products industry". Solar generated energy is becoming more in use with solar energy generators currently installed ranking Georgia 15th in the country in installed solar capacity. In 2013, $189 million was invested in Georgia to install solar for home, business and utility use representing a 795% increase over the previous year.

Major products in the mineral industry include a variety of clays, stones, sands and the clay palygorskite, known as attapulgite.

=== Logistics ===
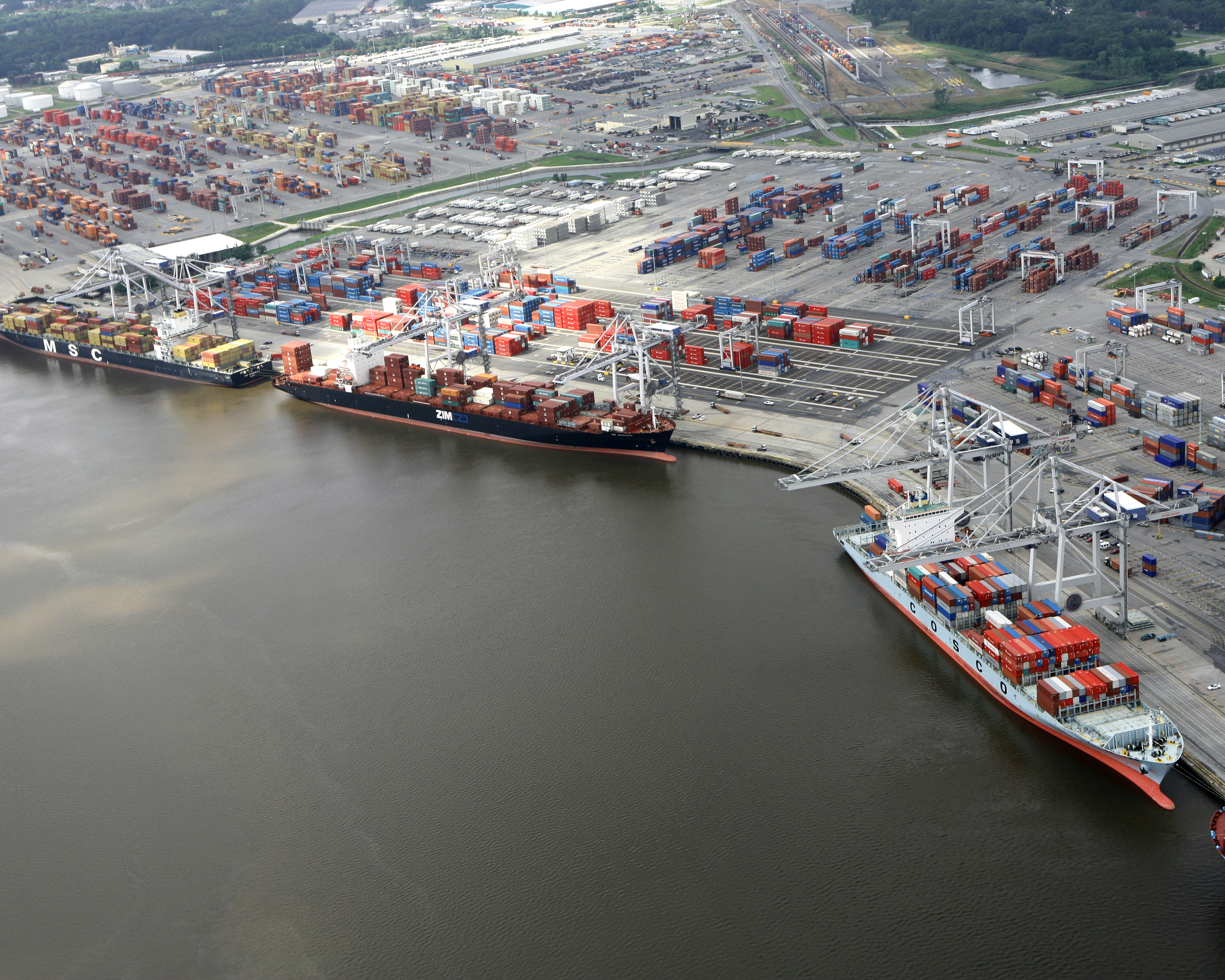
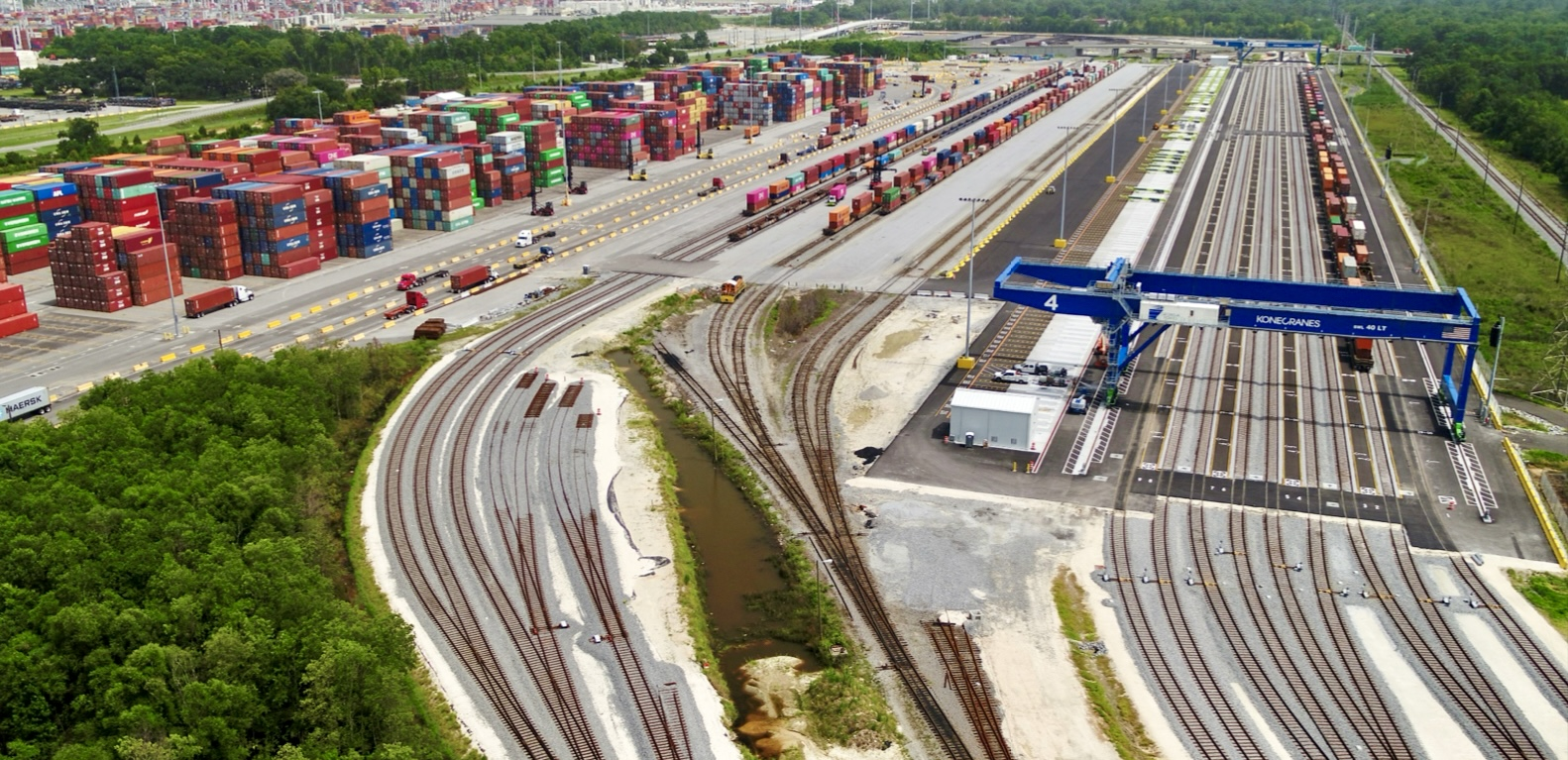
The Port of Savannah and intermodal terminal

In 2017, Georgia ranked second among all states for infrastructure and global access by Area Development magazine.

The Georgia Ports Authority owns and operates four ports in the state: Port of Savannah, Port of Brunswick, Port Bainbridge, and Port Columbus. The Port of Savannah is the third-busiest seaport in the United States, importing and exporting a total of 4.9 million TEUs for 2023. The Port of Savannah's Garden City Terminal is the largest single container terminal in North America. Several major companies including Target, IKEA, and Heineken operate distribution centers in close proximity to the Port of Savannah.

Hartsfield–Jackson Atlanta International Airport moves over 650,000 tons of cargo annually through three cargo complexes (2 million square feet or 200,000 square meters of floor space). It has nearby cold storage for perishables; it is the only airport in the Southeast with USDA-approved cold-treatment capabilities. Delta Air Lines also offers an on-airport refrigeration facility for perishable cargo, and a 250-acre Foreign Trade Zone is located at the airport.

Georgia is a major railway hub, has the most extensive rail system in the Southeast, and has the service of two Class I railroads, CSX and Norfolk Southern, plus 24 short-line railroads. Georgia is ranked the No. 3 state in the nation for rail accessibility. Rail shipments include intermodal, bulk, automotive and every other type of shipment.

Georgia has an extensive interstate highway system including 1,200 miles (1,900 kilometers) of interstate highway and 20,000 miles (32,000 kilometers) of federal and state highways that facilitate the efficient movement of more than $620 billion of cargo by truck each year. Georgia's six interstates connect to 80 percent of the U.S. population within a two-day truck drive. More than $14 billion in funding has been approved for new roadway infrastructure.

=== Military ===
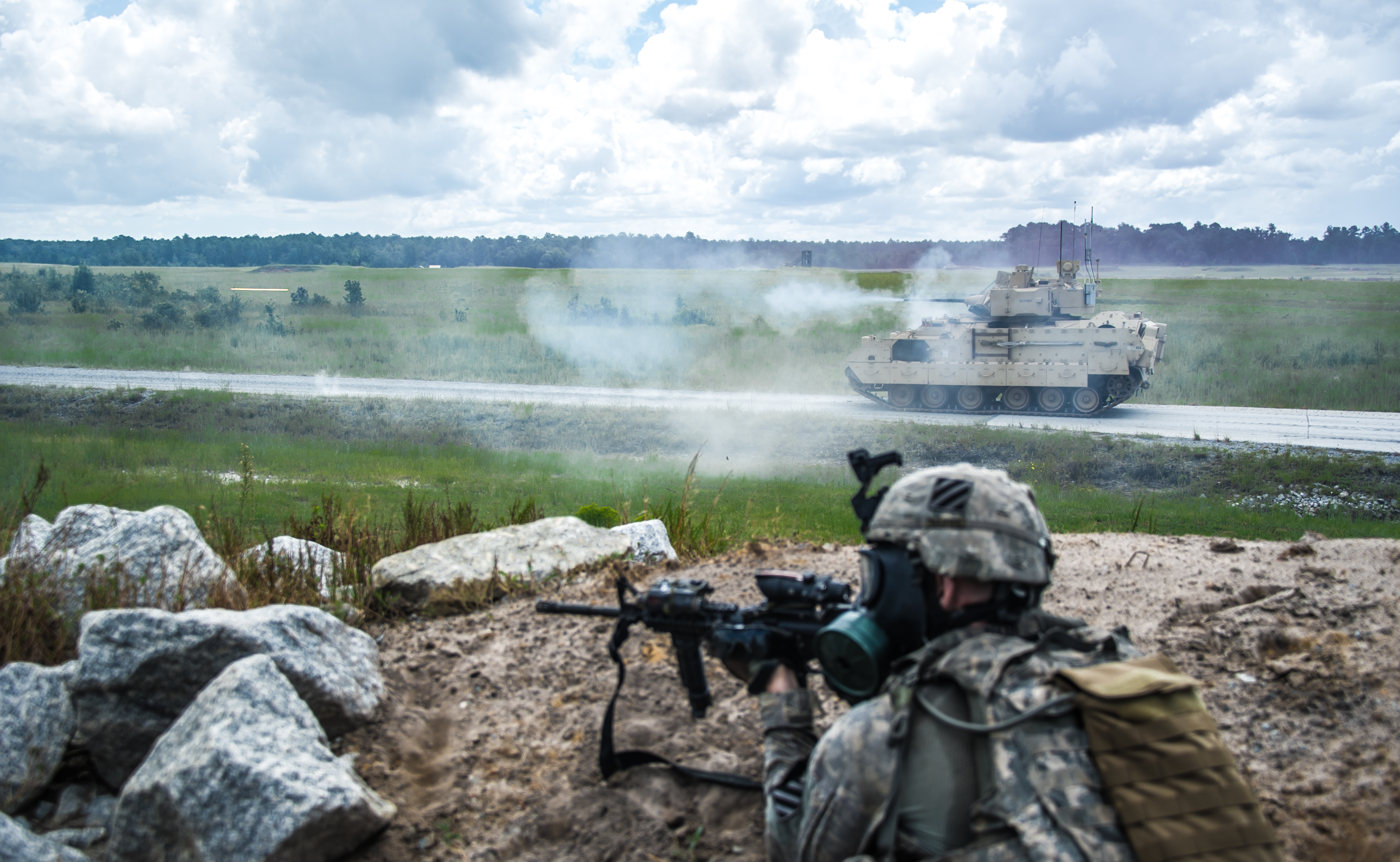
Fort Stewart

Southern congressmen have attracted major investment by the U.S. military in the state. The several installations include Moody Air Force Base, Fort Stewart, Hunter Army Airfield, Naval Submarine Base Kings Bay, Fort Benning, Robins Air Force Base, Fort Gordon, Marine Corps Logistics Base Albany, Dobbins Air Reserve Base, Coast Guard Air Station Savannah and Coast Guard Station Brunswick. These installations command numerous jobs and business for related contractors.

=== Tourism ===
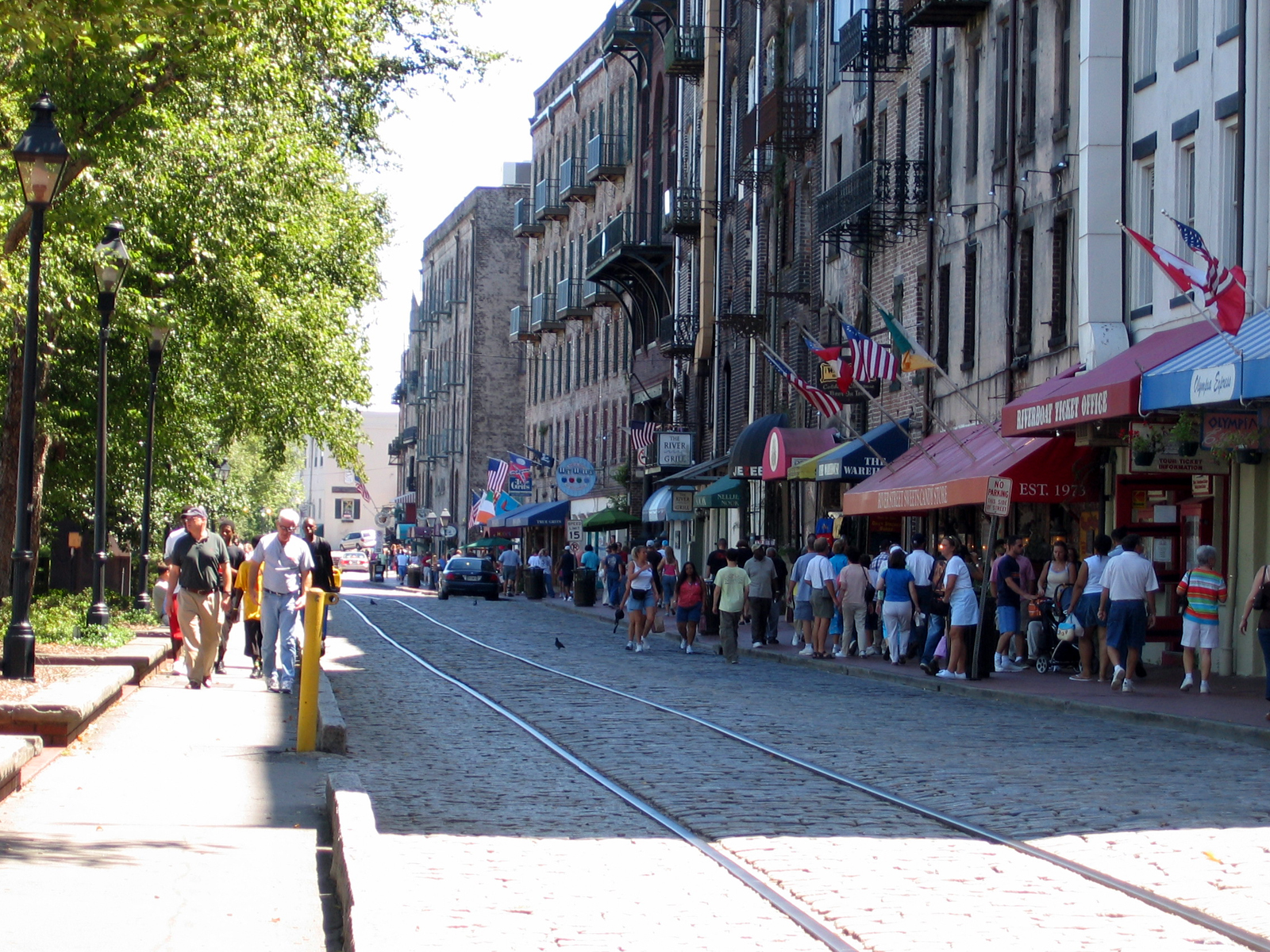
Savannah's River Street is a popular tourist destination.

In the Atlanta area, World of Coke, Georgia Aquarium, Zoo Atlanta and Stone Mountain are important tourist attractions. Stone Mountain is Georgia's "most popular attraction"; receiving more than four million tourists per year. The Georgia Aquarium, in Atlanta, was the largest aquarium in the world in 2010 according to Guinness World Records.

Callaway Gardens, in western Georgia, is a family resort. The area is also popular with golfers.

The Savannah Historic District attracts more than 11 million tourists each year.

The Golden Isles is a string of barrier islands off the Atlantic coast of Georgia near Brunswick that includes beaches, golf courses and the Cumberland Island National Seashore.

Several sites honor the lives and careers of noted American leaders: the Little White House in Warm Springs, which served as the summer residence of President Franklin Delano Roosevelt while he was being treated for polio; President Jimmy Carter's hometown of Plains and the Carter Presidential Center in Atlanta; the Martin Luther King Jr. National Historical Park in Atlanta, which is the final resting place of Martin Luther King Jr. and Coretta Scott King; and Atlanta's Ebenezer Baptist Church, where King preached.

=== Taxes ===
Georgia has a progressive income tax structure with six brackets of state income tax rates that range from 1% to 6%. In 2009, Georgians paid 9% of their income in state and local taxes, compared to the U.S. average of 9.8% of income. This ranks Georgia 25th among the states for total state and local tax burden. The state sales tax in Georgia is 4% with additional percentages added through local options (e.g. special-purpose local-option sales tax or SPLOST), but there is no sales tax on prescription drugs, certain medical devices, or food items for home consumption.

The state legislature may allow municipalities to institute local sales taxes and special local taxes, such as the 2% SPLOST tax and the 1% sales tax for MARTA serviced counties. Excise taxes are levied on alcohol, tobacco, and motor fuel. Owners of real property in Georgia pay property tax to their county. All taxes are collected by the Georgia Department of Revenue and then properly distributed according to any agreements that each county has with its cities.

=== Housing ===
In 2025, all states were ranked on housing affordability and future housing construction. Out of 50 states, Georgia was in the top 10 for housing purchase affordability and was in the top seven that accounted for more than 50% of all 2024 construction permits to build homes. Georgia is one of the top 10 states that are "striking a balance between both affordability and robust homebuilding efforts", Realtor.com reported.

== Culture ==
=== Fine and performing arts ===
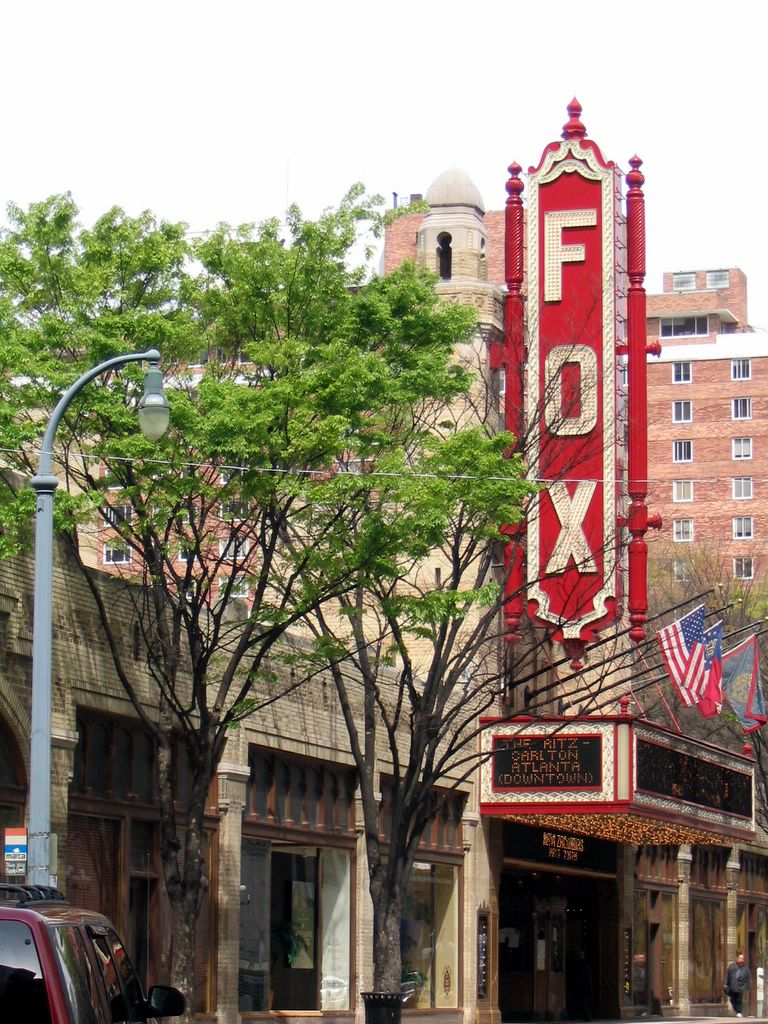
The Fox Theatre in Midtown Atlanta, centerpiece of the Historic District

Georgia's major fine art museums include the High Museum of Art and the Michael C. Carlos Museum, both in Atlanta; the Georgia Museum of Art on the campus of the University of Georgia in Athens; Telfair Museum of Art and the SCAD Museum of Art in Savannah; and the Morris Museum of Art in Augusta.

The state theatre of Georgia is the Springer Opera House located in Columbus.

The Atlanta Opera brings opera to Georgia stages. The Atlanta Symphony Orchestra is the most widely recognized orchestra and largest arts organization in the southeastern United States.

There are a number of performing arts venues in the state, among the largest are the Fox Theatre, and the Alliance Theatre at the Woodruff Arts Center, both on Peachtree Street in Midtown Atlanta as well as the Cobb Energy Performing Arts Centre, located in Northwest Atlanta.

=== Films and literature ===
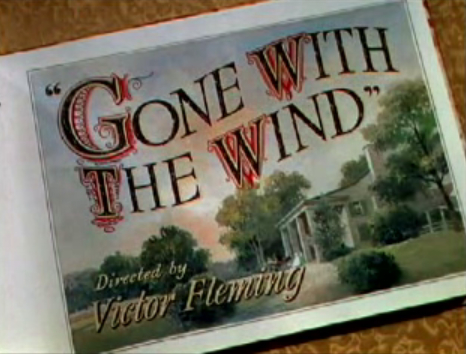
The 1939 film Gone with the Wind (trailer pictured), and the 1936 novel by Margaret Mitchell, are set in Georgia

Two movies, both set in Atlanta, won Oscars for Best Picture: Gone with the Wind (1939) and Driving Miss Daisy (1989). Other films set in Georgia include Deliverance (1972), Parental Guidance (2012), and Vacation (2015).

Authors have grappled with Georgia's complex history. Popular novels related to this include Margaret Mitchell's Gone with the Wind, Olive Ann Burns' Cold Sassy Tree, and Alice Walker's The Color Purple. A number of noted authors, poets and playwrights have lived in Georgia, such as James Dickey, Flannery O'Connor, Sidney Lanier, Frank Yerby and Lewis Grizzard.

=== Music ===
A number of notable musicians in various genres of popular music are from Georgia. Among them are Ray Charles (whose many hits include "Georgia on My Mind", now the official state song), and Gladys Knight (known for her Georgia-themed song, "Midnight Train to Georgia").

Rock groups from Georgia include the Atlanta Rhythm Section, The Black Crowes, and The Allman Brothers.

The city of Athens sparked an influential rock music scene in the 1980s and 1990s. Among the groups achieving their initial prominence there were R.E.M., Widespread Panic, and the B-52's.

Since the 1990s, various hip-hop and R&B musicians have included top-selling artists such as Outkast, Usher, Ludacris, TLC, B.o.B., and Ciara. Atlanta is mentioned in a number of these artists' tracks, such as Usher's "A-Town Down" reference in his 2004 hit "Yeah!" (which also features Atlanta artists Lil Jon and Ludacris), Ludacris' "Welcome to Atlanta", Outkast's album "ATLiens", and B.o.B.'s multiple references to Decatur, Georgia, as in his hit song "Strange Clouds".

=== Television ===
Well-known television shows set in Atlanta include, from Tyler Perry Studios, House of Payne and Tyler Perry's Meet the Browns, The Real Housewives of Atlanta, the CBS sitcom Designing Women, Matlock, the popular AMC series The Walking Dead, FX comedy drama Atlanta, Lifetime's Drop Dead Diva, Rectify and numerous HGTV original productions.

The Dukes of Hazzard, a 1980s TV show, was set in the fictional Hazzard County, Georgia. The first five episodes were shot on location in Conyers and Covington, Georgia as well as some locations in Atlanta. Production was then moved to Burbank, California.

Also filmed in Georgia was The Vampire Diaries, using Covington as the setting for the fictional Mystic Falls.

=== Sports ===
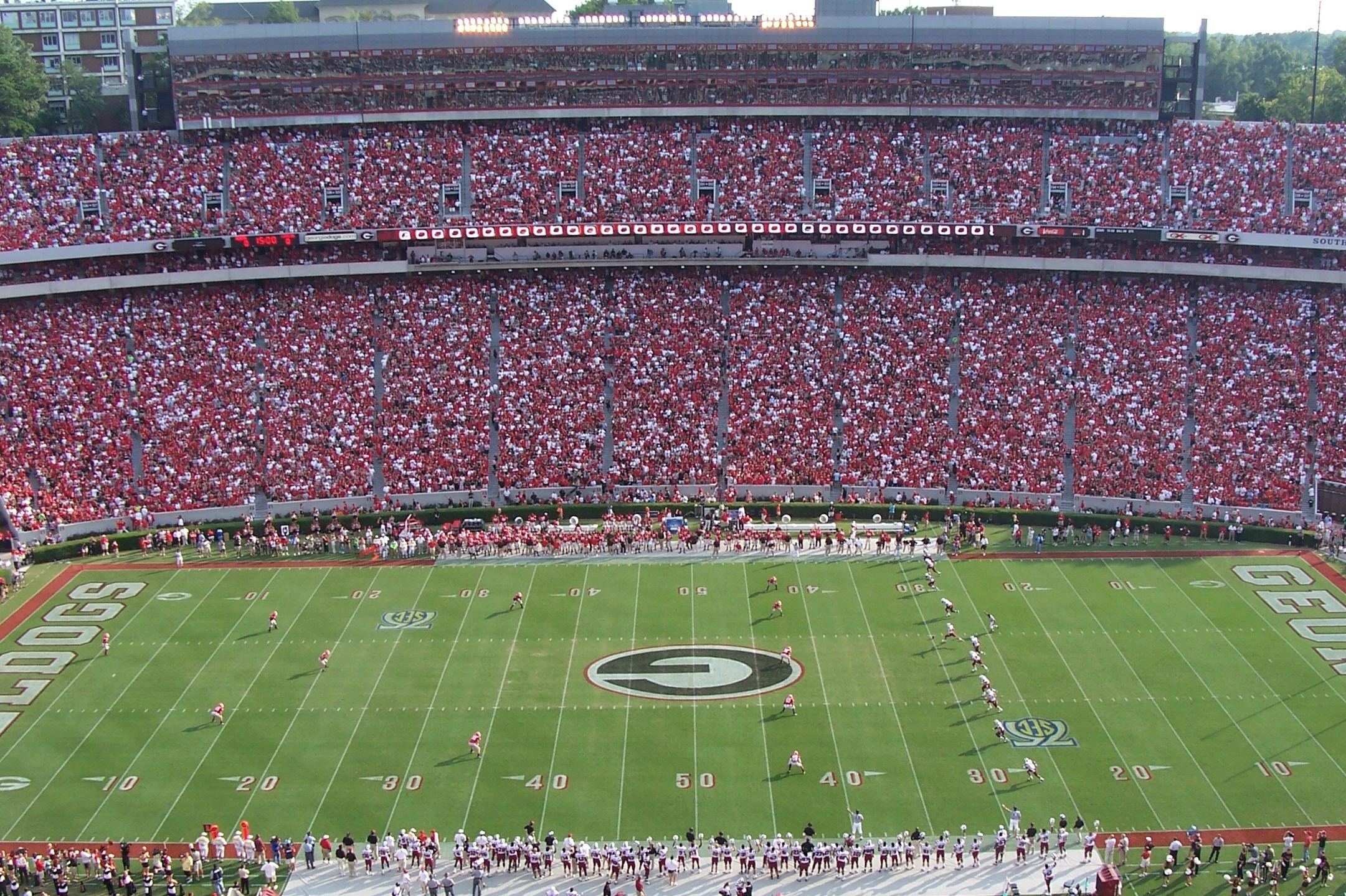
Kickoff, Sanford Stadium, Athens

Sports in Georgia include professional teams in nearly all major sports, Olympic Games contenders and medalists, collegiate teams in major and small-school conferences and associations, and active amateur teams and individual sports. The state of Georgia has teams in four major professional leagues—the Atlanta Braves of Major League Baseball, the Atlanta Falcons of the National Football League, the Atlanta Hawks of the National Basketball Association, and Atlanta United FC of Major League Soccer.

The Georgia Bulldogs (Southeastern Conference), Georgia Tech Yellow Jackets (Atlantic Coast Conference), Georgia State Panthers and Georgia Southern Eagles (Sun Belt Conference), and Kennesaw State Owls (Conference USA) are Georgia's NCAA Division I FBS football teams, having won multiple national championships between them. The Georgia Bulldogs and the Georgia Tech Yellow Jackets have a historical rivalry in college football known as Clean, Old-Fashioned Hate, and the Georgia State Panthers and the Georgia Southern Eagles have recently developed their own rivalry.

The 1996 Summer Olympics took place in Atlanta. The stadium that was built to host various Olympic events was converted to Turner Field, home of the Atlanta Braves through 2016. Atlanta served as a host city for the 2026 FIFA World Cup.

The Masters golf tournament, the first of the PGA Tour's four "majors", is held annually the second weekend of April at the Augusta National Golf Club.

The RSM Classic is a golf tournament on the PGA Tour, played in the autumn in Saint Simons Island, Georgia.

The Atlanta Motor Speedway hosts the Dixie 500 NASCAR Cup Series stock car race and Road Atlanta the Petit Le Mans endurance sports car race.

Atlanta's Georgia Dome hosted Super Bowl XXVIII in 1994 and Super Bowl XXXIV in 2000. The dome has hosted the NCAA Final Four Men's Basketball National Championship in 2002, 2007, and 2013. It hosted WWE's WrestleMania XXVII in 2011, an event which set an attendance record of 71,617. The venue was also the site of the annual Chick-fil-A Peach Bowl post-season college football games. Since 2017, they have been held at the Mercedes-Benz Stadium along with the FIRST World Championships.

Professional baseball's Ty Cobb was the first player inducted into the Baseball Hall of Fame. He was from Narrows, Georgia and was nicknamed the "Georgia Peach".

The Mercedes-Benz Stadium hosted Super Bowl LIII in 2018 and the CFP National Championship in the same year, the SEC Championship Game in 2017, the MLS All-Star Game in 2018, the MLS Cup in 2018, and the record-setting friendly fixture between Mexico Men's National Football Team and Honduras Men's National Football Team.

WWE Hall of Famer Hulk Hogan is from Augusta, Georgia, and State Farm Arena is to host RAW on January 27, 2025. Atlanta has also hosted WrestleMania XXVII and the 2002 and 2010 Royal Rumble. State Farm Arena also hosted Bad Blood (2024).

== Education ==
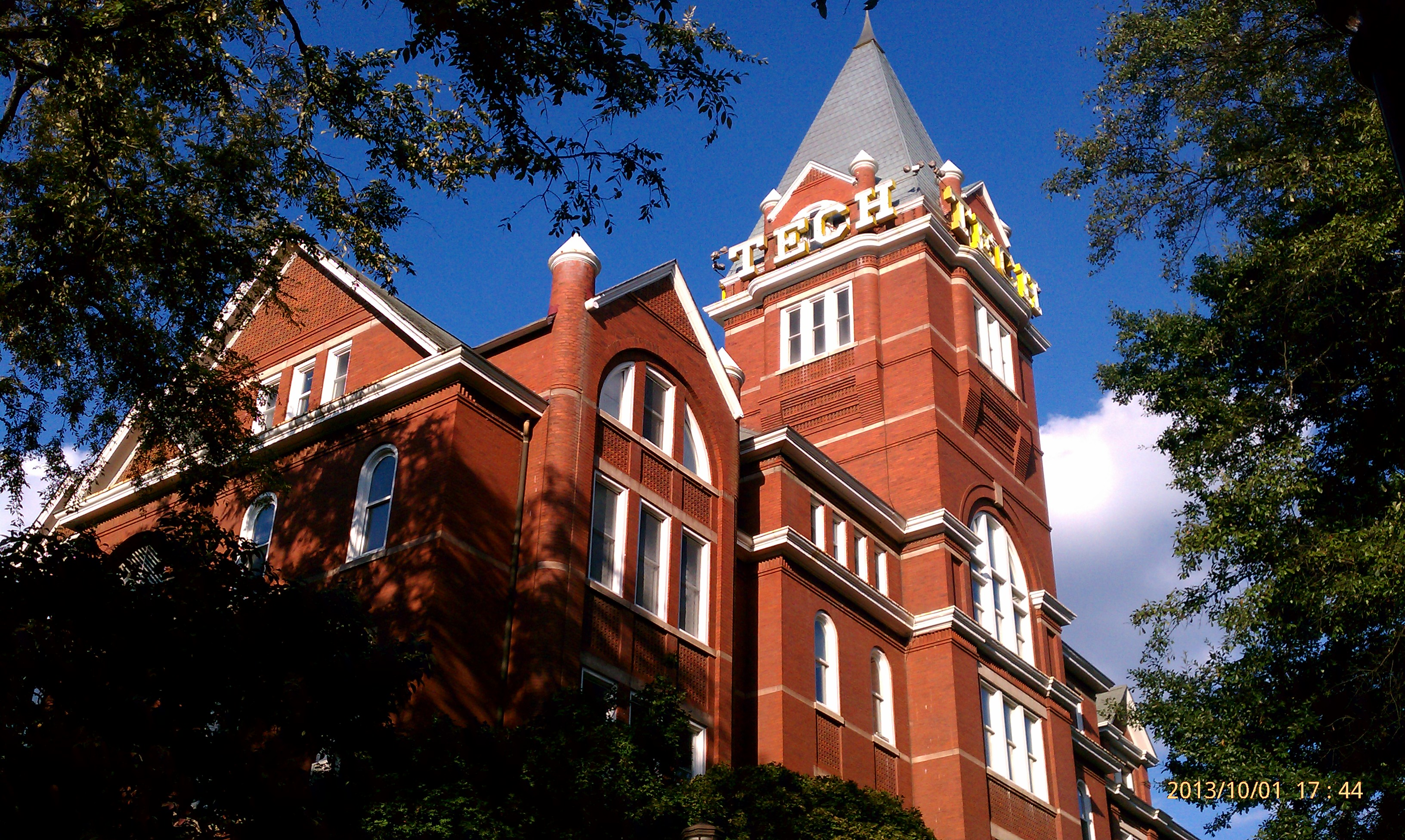
Georgia Tech's Tech Tower

Georgia county and city public school systems are administered by school boards with members elected at the local level. As of 2013, all but 19 of 181 boards are elected from single-member districts. Residents and activist groups in Fayette County sued the board of commissioners and school board for maintaining an election system based on at-large voting, which tended to increase the power of the majority and effectively prevented minority participation on elected local boards for nearly 200 years. A change to single-member districts has resulted in the African-American minority being able to elect representatives of its choice.

Georgia high schools (grades nine through twelve) are required to administer a standardized, multiple choice End of Course Test, or EOCT, in each of eight core subjects: algebra, geometry, U.S. history, economics, biology, physical science, ninth-grade literature and composition, and American literature. The official purpose of the tests is to assess "specific content knowledge and skills". Although a minimum test score is not required for the student to receive credit in the course, completion of the test is mandatory. The EOCT score accounts for 15% of a student's grade in the course. The Georgia Milestone evaluation is taken by public school students in the state. In 2020, because of the ongoing COVID-19 pandemic, the Georgia State BOE agreed to state superintendent Richard Woods' proposal to change the weight of the EOCT test to only count for 0.01% of the Student's course grade. This change is currently only in effect for the 2020–21 school year.

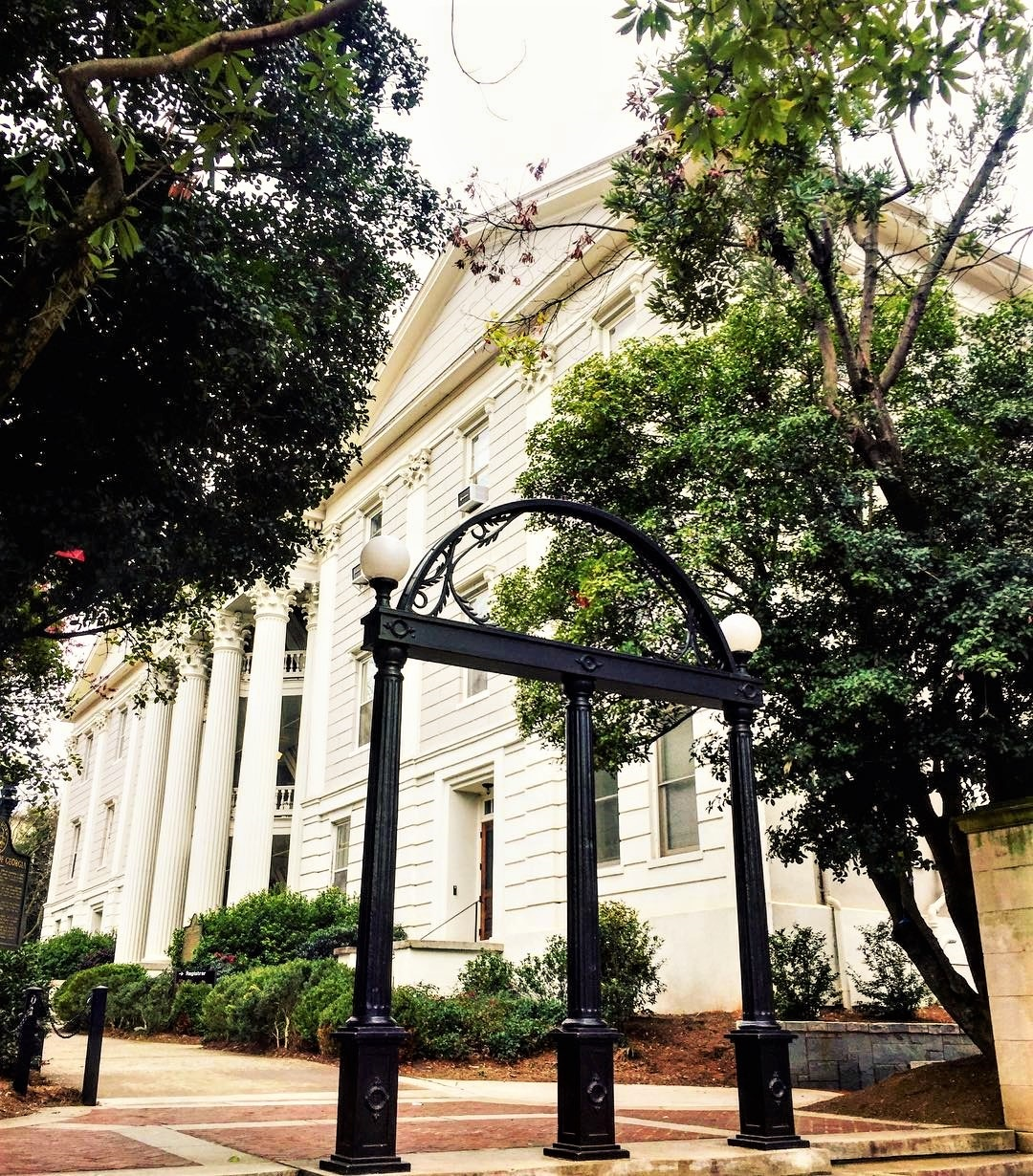
The Arch at the entrance to the University of Georgia's North Campus

Georgia has 85 public colleges, universities, and technical colleges in addition to more than 45 private institutes of higher learning. Among Georgia's public universities is the flagship research university, the University of Georgia, founded in 1785 as the country's oldest state-chartered university and the birthplace of the American system of public higher education. The University System of Georgia is the presiding body over public post-secondary education in the state. The system includes 26 institutions of higher learning and is governed by the Georgia Board of Regents. Georgia's workforce of more than 6.3 million is constantly refreshed by the growing number of people who move there along with the 90,000 graduates from the universities, colleges and technical colleges across the state, including the highly ranked University of Georgia, Georgia Institute of Technology, Georgia State University, Morehouse College, Spelman College, Agnes Scott College, and Emory University.

The HOPE Scholarship, funded by the state lottery, is available to all Georgia residents who have graduated from high school or earned a General Educational Development certificate. The student must maintain a 3.0 or higher grade point average and attend a public college or university in the state.

The Georgia Historical Society, an independent educational and research institution, has a research center located in Savannah. The research center's library and archives hold the oldest collection of materials related to Georgia history in the nation.

== Media ==
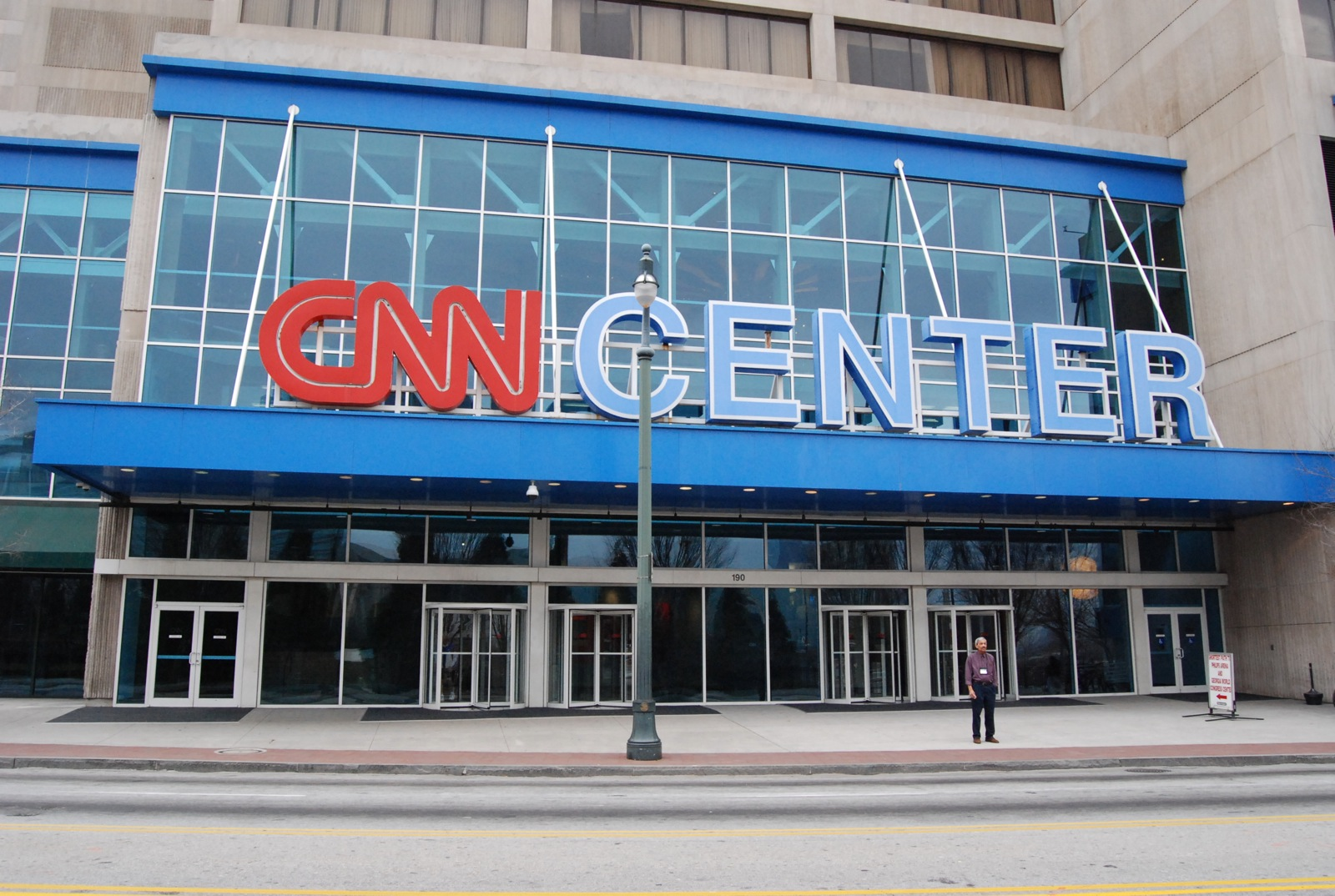
The former CNN Center in Atlanta

The Atlanta metropolitan area is the ninth largest media market in the United States as ranked by Nielsen Media Research. The state's other top markets are Savannah (95th largest), Augusta (115th largest), and Columbus (127th largest).

There are 48 television broadcast stations in Georgia including TBS, TNT, TCM, Cartoon Network, CNN and Headline News, all founded by notable Georgia resident Ted Turner. The Weather Channel also has its headquarters in Atlanta.

By far, the largest daily newspaper in Georgia is the Atlanta Journal-Constitution with a daily readership of 195,592 and a Sunday readership of 397,925. Other large dailies include The Augusta Chronicle, the Columbus Ledger-Enquirer, The Telegraph (formerly The Macon Telegraph) and the Savannah Morning News.

WSB-AM in Atlanta was the first licensed radio station in the southeastern United States, signing on in 1922. Georgia Public Broadcasting has been in service since 1984 and broadcasts daily on several FM stations across the state. The Atlanta area is additionally served by WABE public radio.

WSB-TV in Atlanta is the state's oldest television station, having begun operations in 1948. WSB the first television service in Georgia, and the South.

== Government ==
=== State government ===
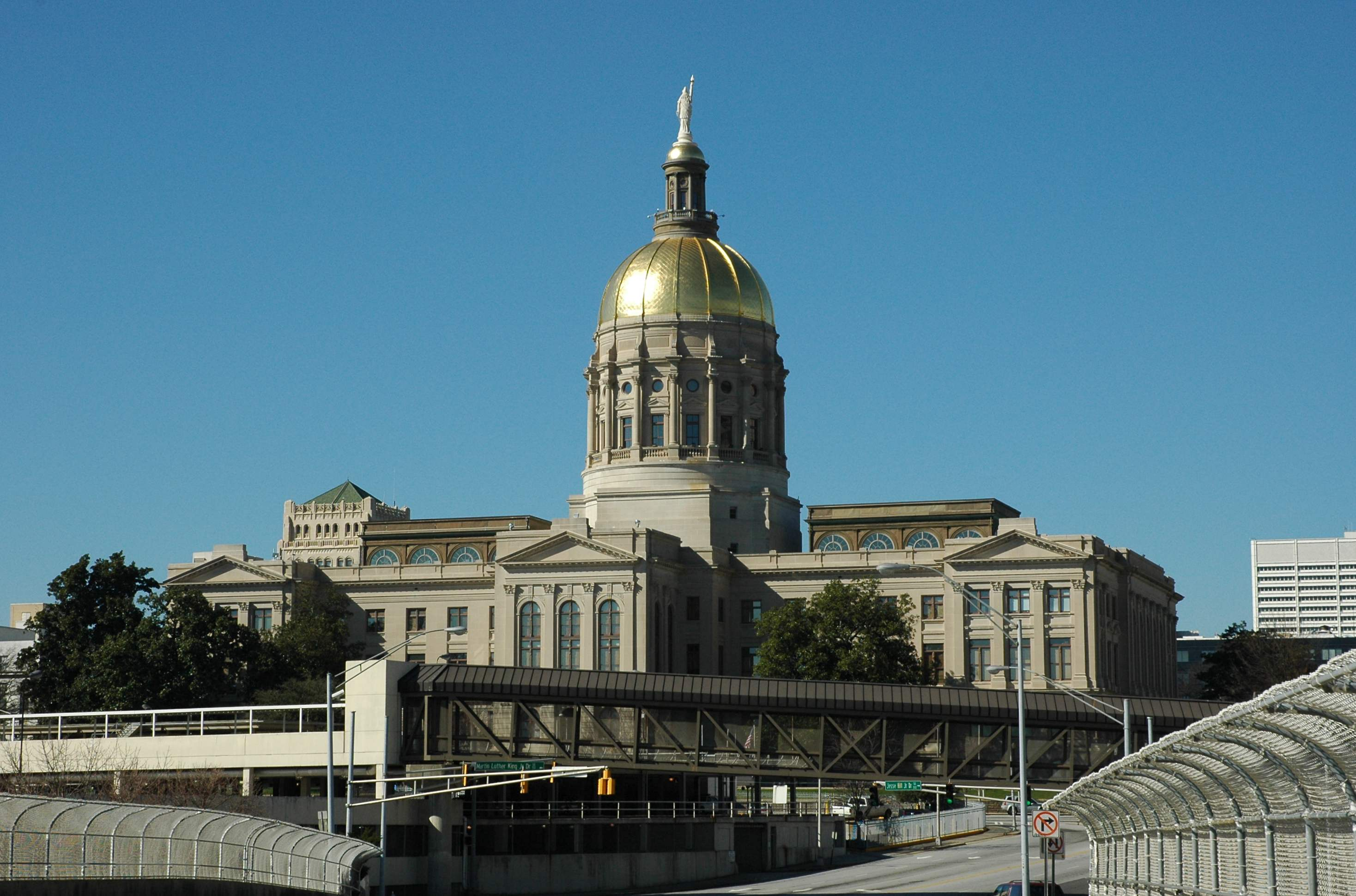
The Georgia State Capitol in Atlanta, with the distinctive gold dome

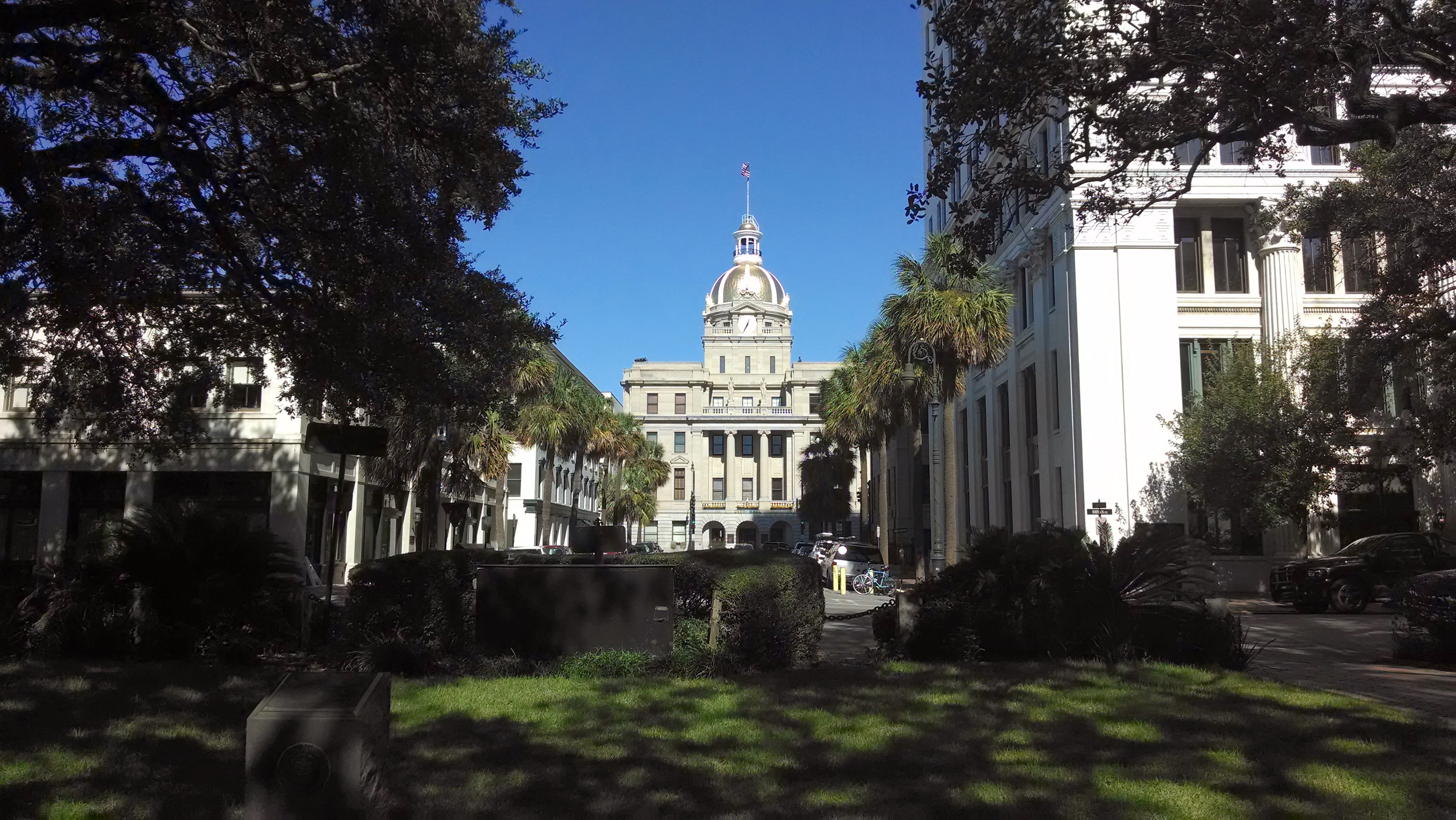
Savannah City Hall

As with all other U.S. states and the federal government, Georgia's government is based on the separation of legislative, executive, and judicial power. Executive authority in the state rests with the governor, currently Brian Kemp (Republican). Both the Governor of Georgia and lieutenant governor are elected on separate ballots to four-year terms of office. Unlike the federal government, but like many other U.S. States, most of the executive officials who comprise the governor's cabinet are elected by the citizens of Georgia rather than appointed by the governor.

Legislative authority resides in the General Assembly, composed of the Senate and House of Representatives. The lieutenant governor presides over the Senate, while members of the House of Representatives select their own Speaker. The Georgia Constitution mandates a maximum of 56 senators, elected from single-member districts, and a minimum of 180 representatives, apportioned among representative districts (which sometimes results in more than one representative per district); there are currently 56 senators and 180 representatives. The term of office for senators and representatives is two years. The laws enacted by the General Assembly are codified in the Official Code of Georgia Annotated.

State judicial authority rests with the state Supreme Court and Court of Appeals, which have statewide authority. In addition, there are smaller courts which have more limited geographical jurisdiction, including Superior Courts, State Courts, Juvenile Courts, Magistrate Courts and Probate Courts. Justices of the Supreme Court and judges of the Court of Appeals are elected statewide by the citizens in non-partisan elections to six-year terms. Judges for the smaller courts are elected to four-year terms by the state's citizens who live within that court's jurisdiction.

=== Local government ===
Georgia consists of 159 counties, second only to Texas, with 254. Georgia had 161 counties until the end of 1931, when Milton and Campbell were merged into the existing Fulton. Some counties have been named for prominent figures in both American and Georgian history, and many bear names with Native American origin. Counties in Georgia have their own elected legislative branch, usually called the Board of Commissioners, which usually also has executive authority in the county. Several counties have a sole commissioner form of government, with legislative and executive authority vested in a single person. Georgia is the only state with current sole-commissioner counties. Georgia's Constitution provides all counties and cities with "home rule" authority. The county commissions have considerable power to pass legislation within their county, as a municipality would.

Georgia recognizes all local units of government as cities, so every incorporated town is legally a city. Georgia does not provide for townships or independent cities, though there have been bills proposed in the Legislature to provide for townships; it does allow consolidated city-county governments by local referendum. All of Georgia's second-tier cities except Savannah have now formed consolidated city-county governments by referendum: Columbus (in 1970), Athens (1990), Augusta (1995), and Macon (2012). (Augusta and Athens have excluded one or more small, incorporated towns within their consolidated boundaries; Columbus and Macon eventually absorbed all smaller incorporated entities within their consolidated boundaries.) The small town of Cusseta adopted a consolidated city-county government after it merged with unincorporated Chattahoochee County in 2003. Three years later, in 2006, the town of Georgetown consolidated with the rest of Quitman County.

There is no true metropolitan government in Georgia, though the Atlanta Regional Commission (ARC) and Georgia Regional Transportation Authority do provide some services, and the ARC must review all major land development projects in the Atlanta metropolitan area.

=== Elections ===
Georgia voted Republican in six consecutive presidential elections from 1996 to 2016, a streak that was broken when the state went for Democratic candidate Joe Biden in 2020.

Until 1964, Georgia's state government had the longest unbroken record of single-party dominance, by the Democratic Party, of any state in the Union. This record was established largely due to the disenfranchisement of most blacks and many poor whites by the state in its constitution and laws in the early 20th century. Some elements, such as requiring payment of poll taxes and passing literacy tests, prevented blacks from registering to vote; their exclusion from the political system lasted into the 1960s and reduced the Republican Party to a non-competitive status in the early 20th century.

White Democrats regained power after Reconstruction due in part to the efforts of some using intimidation and violence, but this method came into disrepute. In 1900, shortly before Georgia adopted a disfranchising constitutional amendment in 1908, blacks comprised 47% of the state's population.

The whites dealt with this problem of potential political power by the 1908 amendment, which in practice disenfranchised blacks and poor whites, nearly half of the state population. It required that any male at least 21 years of age wanting to register to vote must also be of good character and able to pass a test on citizenship, be able to read and write provisions of the U.S. and Georgia constitutions, or own at least forty acres of land or $500 in property. Any Georgian who had fought in any war from the American Revolution through the Spanish–American War was exempted from these additional qualifications. More importantly, any Georgian descended from a veteran of any of these wars also was exempted. Because, by 1908, many white Georgia males were grandsons of veterans or owned the required property, the exemption and the property requirement basically allowed only well-to-do whites to vote. The qualifications of good character, citizenship knowledge, literacy (all determined subjectively by white registrars), and property ownership were used to disqualify most blacks and poor whites, preventing them from registering to vote. The voter rolls dropped dramatically. In the early 20th century, Progressives promoted electoral reform and reducing the power of ward bosses to clean up politics. Their additional rules, such as the eight box law, continued to effectively close out people who were illiterate. White one-party rule was solidified.

For more than 130 years, from 1872 to 2003, Georgians nominated and elected only white Democratic governors, and white Democrats held the majority of seats in the General Assembly. Most of the Democrats elected throughout these years were Southern Democrats, who were fiscally and socially conservative by national standards. This voting pattern continued after the segregationist period.

Legal segregation was ended by passage of federal legislation in the 1960s. According to the 1960 census, the proportion of Georgia's population that was African American was 28%; hundreds of thousands of blacks had left the state in the Great Migration to the North and Midwest. New white residents arrived through migration and immigration. Following support from the national Democratic Party for the civil rights movement and especially civil rights legislation of 1964 and 1965, most African-American voters, as well as other minority voters, have largely supported the Democratic Party in Georgia.

In 2002, incumbent moderate Democratic governor Roy Barnes was defeated by Republican Sonny Perdue, a state legislator and former Democrat. While Democrats retained control of the State House, they lost their majority in the Senate when four Democrats switched parties. They lost the House in the 2004 election. Republicans then controlled all three partisan elements of the state government.

Even before 2002, the state had become increasingly supportive of Republicans in presidential elections. It has supported a Democrat for president only four times since 1960. In 1976 and 1980, native son Jimmy Carter carried the state; in 1992, the former Arkansas governor Bill Clinton narrowly won the state; and in 2020, Joe Biden narrowly carried the state. Generally, Republicans were strongest in the predominantly white suburban (especially the Atlanta suburbs) and rural portions of the state. Many of these areas were represented by conservative Democrats in the state legislature well into the 21st century. One of the most conservative of these was U.S. congressman Larry McDonald, former head of the John Birch Society, who died when the Soviet Union shot down KAL 007 near Sakhalin Island. Democratic candidates have tended to win a higher percentage of the vote in the areas where black voters are most numerous, as well as in the cities among liberal urban populations (especially Atlanta and Athens), and the central and southwestern portion of the state.

The ascendancy of the Republican Party in Georgia and in the South in general resulted in Georgia U.S. House of Representatives member Newt Gingrich being elected as Speaker of the House following the election of a Republican majority in the House in 1994. Gingrich served as Speaker until 1999, when he resigned in the aftermath of the loss of House seats held by members of the GOP. Gingrich mounted an unsuccessful bid for president in the 2012 election, but withdrew after winning only the South Carolina and Georgia primaries.

In 2008, Democrat Jim Martin ran against incumbent Republican senator Saxby Chambliss. Chambliss failed to acquire the necessary 50 percent of votes due to a Libertarian Party candidate receiving the remainder of votes. In the runoff election held on December 2, 2008, Chambliss became the second Georgia Republican to be reelected to the U.S. Senate.

In the 2018 elections, the governorship remained under control by a Republican (by 54,723 votes against a Democrat, Stacey Abrams), Republicans lost eight seats in the Georgia House of Representatives (winning 106), while Democrats gained ten (winning 74), Republicans lost two seats in the Georgia Senate (winning 35 seats), while Democrats gained two seats (winning 21), and five Democrat U.S. representatives were elected with Republicans winning nine seats (one winning with just 419 votes over the Democratic challenger, and one seat being lost).

In the three presidential elections up to and including 2016, the Republican candidate has won Georgia by approximately five to eight points over the Democratic nominee, at least once for each election being narrower than margins recorded in some states that have flipped within that timeframe, such as Michigan, Ohio and Wisconsin. This trend led to the state narrowly electing Democrat Joe Biden for president in 2020, and it coming to be regarded as a swing state.

In a 2020 study, Georgia was ranked as 49th on the "Cost of Voting Index" with only Texas ranking higher. In 2022, Georgia swung substantially back to the right towards Republicans with incumbent Republican governor Brian Kemp winning reelection by 7.5% over Democrat Stacey Abrams with a raw vote margin of over 300,000 votes in the 2022 Georgia gubernatorial election; the largest amount since the early 2000s, and every other Republican statewide getting elected by a 5–10% margin of victory.

=== Politics ===
During the 1960s and 1970s, Georgia made significant changes in civil rights and governance. As in many other states, its legislature had not reapportioned congressional districts according to population from 1931 to after the 1960 census. Problems of malapportionment in the state legislature, where rural districts had outsize power in relation to urban districts, such as Atlanta's, were corrected after the U.S. Supreme Court ruling in Wesberry v. Sanders (1964). The court ruled that congressional districts had to be reapportioned to have essentially equal populations.

A related case, Reynolds v. Sims (1964), required state legislatures to end their use of geographical districts or counties in favor of "one man, one vote"; that is, districts based upon approximately equal populations, to be reviewed and changed as necessary after each census. These changes resulted in residents of Atlanta and other urban areas gaining political power in Georgia in proportion to their populations. From the mid-1960s, the voting electorate increased after African Americans' rights to vote were enforced under civil rights law.

Economic growth through this period was dominated by Atlanta and its region. It was a bedrock of the emerging "New South". From the late 20th century, Atlanta attracted headquarters and relocated workers of national companies, becoming more diverse, liberal and cosmopolitan than many areas of the state.

In the 21st century, many conservative Democrats, including former U.S. senator and governor Zell Miller, decided to support Republicans. The state's then-socially conservative bent resulted in wide support for measures such as restrictions on abortion. In 2004, a state constitutional amendment banning same-sex marriages was approved by 76% of voters. However, after the United States Supreme Court issued its ruling in Obergefell v. Hodges, all Georgia counties came into full compliance, recognizing the rights of same-sex couples to marry in the state.

In presidential elections, Georgia voted solely Democratic in every election from 1900 to 1960. In 1964, it was one of only a handful of states to vote for Republican Barry Goldwater over Democrat Lyndon B. Johnson. In 1968, it did not vote for either of the two parties, but rather the American Independent Party and its nominee, Alabama Governor George Wallace. In 1972, the state returned to Republicans as part of a landslide victory for Richard Nixon. In 1976 and 1980, it voted for Democrat and former Georgia governor Jimmy Carter. The state returned to Republicans in 1984 and 1988, before going Democratic once again in 1992. For every election between that year and 2020, Georgia voted heavily Republican, in line with many of its neighbors in the Deep South. In 2020, it voted Democratic for the first time in 28 years, carried by Joe Biden by 11,779 votes in his national defeat of incumbent Republican Donald Trump.

2024 U.S. presidential election results by county in Georgia Democratic Republican

Though Republicans had continued to regularly win state and federal elections, in the years prior to 2020, their margins of victory tended to decrease, and that year, many election forecasts ranked Georgia as a swing state. Concurrent with the 2020 presidential election were elections for both of Georgia's United States Senate seats; when no candidate in either race received a majority of the vote, both went to run-offs, which Democrats Jon Ossoff and Raphael Warnock won. Ossoff is the state's first Jewish senator, and Warnock is the state's first Black senator. The Democratic wins were attributed to the rapid diversification of the suburbs of Atlanta and increased turnout of younger African-American voters, particularly around the suburbs of Atlanta and in Savannah.

However, Republicans rebounded as Governor Brian Kemp won re-election in 2022 by a comfortable margin, and Donald Trump carried the state by 115,000 votes as part of his victory in the 2024 presidential election.

== Parks and recreational activities ==
There are 48 state parks, 15 historic sites, and numerous wildlife preserves under supervision of the Georgia Department of Natural Resources. Other historic sites and parks are supervised by the National Park Service and include the Andersonville National Historic Site in Andersonville; Appalachian National Scenic Trail; Chattahoochee River National Recreation Area near Atlanta; Chickamauga and Chattanooga National Military Park at Fort Oglethorpe; Cumberland Island National Seashore near St. Marys; Fort Frederica National Monument on St. Simons Island; Fort Pulaski National Monument in Savannah; Jimmy Carter National Historic Site near Plains; Kennesaw Mountain National Battlefield Park near Kennesaw; Martin Luther King Jr. National Historical Park in Atlanta; Ocmulgee National Monument at Macon; Trail of Tears National Historic Trail; and the Okefenokee Swamp in Waycross, Georgia.

Outdoor recreational activities include hiking along the Appalachian Trail; Civil War Heritage Trails; rock climbing and whitewater kayaking. Other outdoor activities include hunting and fishing.

== Infrastructure ==
=== Transportation ===
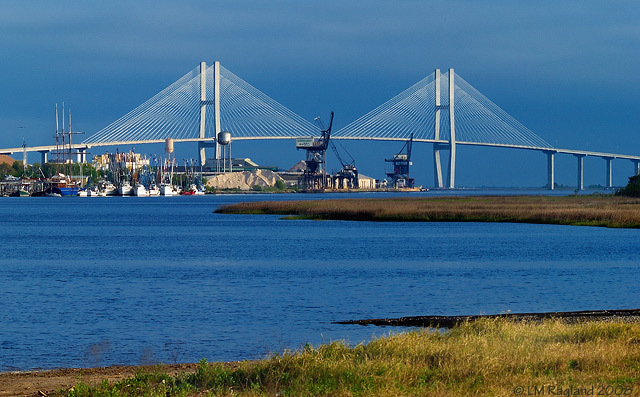
The Port of Brunswick and the Sidney Lanier Bridge

Transportation in Georgia is overseen by the Georgia Department of Transportation, a part of the executive branch of the state government. Georgia's major Interstate Highways are I-20, I-75, I-85, and I-95. On March 18, 1998, the Georgia House of Representatives passed a resolution naming the portion of Interstate 75, which runs from the Chattahoochee River northward to the Tennessee state line the Larry McDonald Memorial Highway. Larry McDonald, a Democratic member of the House of Representatives, had been on Korean Air Lines Flight 007 when it was shot down by the Soviets on September 1, 1983.

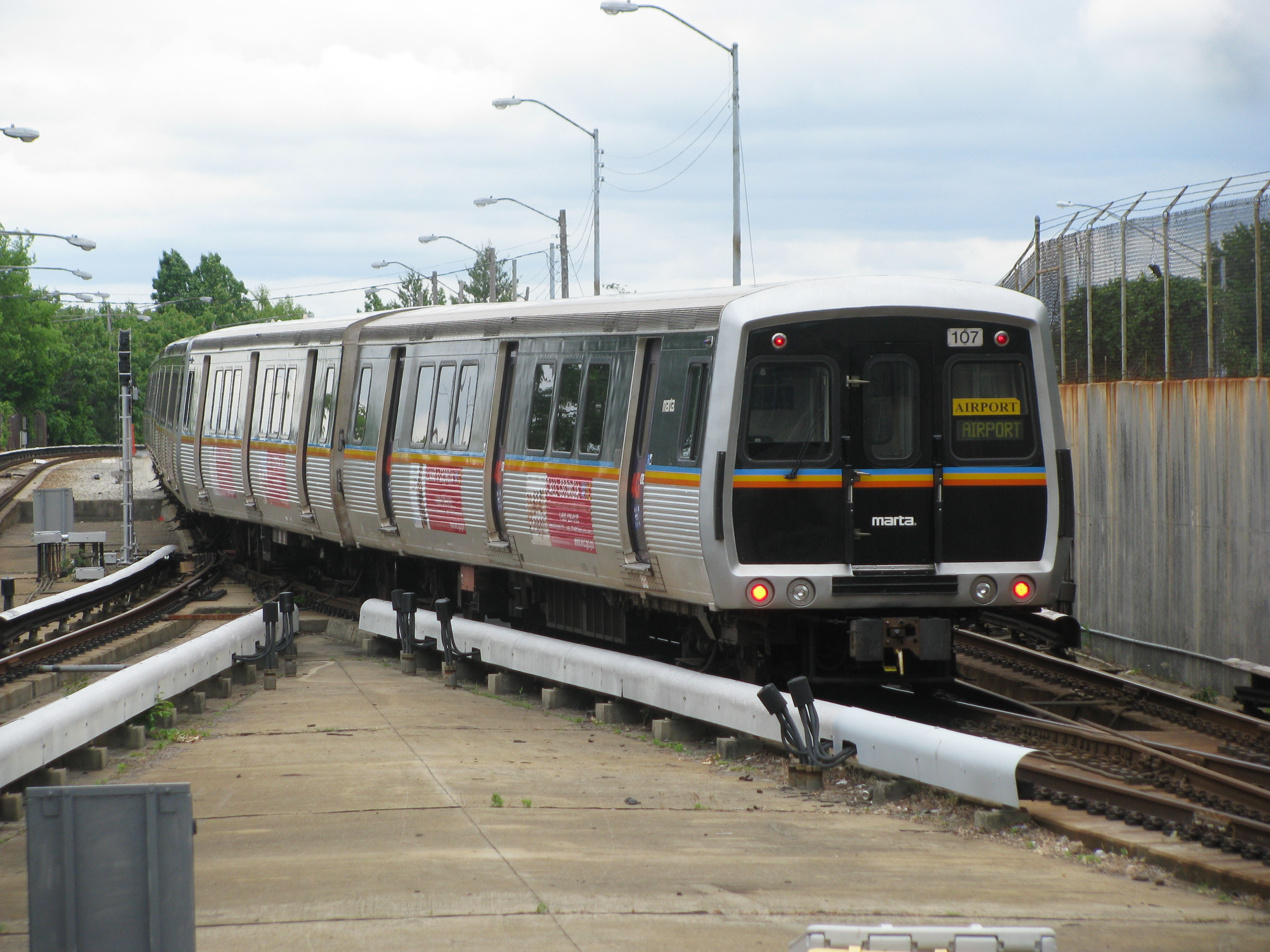
MARTA (rapid transit) train

Georgia's primary commercial airport is Hartsfield–Jackson Atlanta International Airport (ATL), the world's busiest airport. In addition to Hartsfield–Jackson, there are eight other airports serving major commercial traffic in Georgia. Savannah/Hilton Head International Airport is the second-busiest airport in the state as measured by passengers served, and is the only additional international airport. Other commercial airports (ranked in order of passengers served) are located in Augusta, Columbus, Albany, Macon, Brunswick, Valdosta, and Athens.

The Georgia Ports Authority manages two deepwater seaports, at Savannah and Brunswick, and two river ports, at Bainbridge and Columbus. The Port of Savannah is a major U.S. seaport on the Atlantic coast.

The Metropolitan Atlanta Rapid Transit Authority (MARTA) is the principal rapid transit system in the Atlanta metropolitan area. Formed in 1971 as strictly a bus system, MARTA operates a network of bus routes linked to a rapid transit system consisting of 48 miles (77 km) of rail track with 38 train stations. MARTA operates almost exclusively in Fulton and DeKalb counties, with bus service to two destinations in Cobb county and the Cumberland Transfer Center next to the Cumberland Mall, and a single rail station in Clayton County at Hartsfield–Jackson Atlanta International Airport. MARTA also operates a separate paratransit service for disabled customers. As of 2009, the average total daily ridership for the system (bus and rail) was 482,500 passengers.

=== Healthcare ===
The state has 151 general hospitals, more than 15,000 doctors and almost 6,000 dentists. The state is ranked forty-first in the percentage of residents who engage in regular exercise.

== Notable people ==
Jimmy Carter, from Plains, Georgia, was President of the United States from 1977 to 1981. Martin Luther King Jr. was born in Atlanta in 1929. He was a civil rights movement leader who protested for equal rights and against racial discrimination. He won the Nobel Peace Prize in 1964. Blake R. Van Leer played an important role in the civil rights movement, Georgia's economy and was president of Georgia Tech. Mordecai Sheftall, the highest ranking Jewish officer in the American Revolution, was born and lived his life in Georgia. Naomi Chapman Woodruff, originally from Idaho, was responsible for developing a peanut breeding program in Georgia which led to a harvest of nearly five times the typical amount.

== State symbols ==
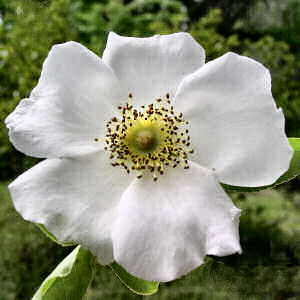
Rosa laevigata (Cherokee rose), the state flower

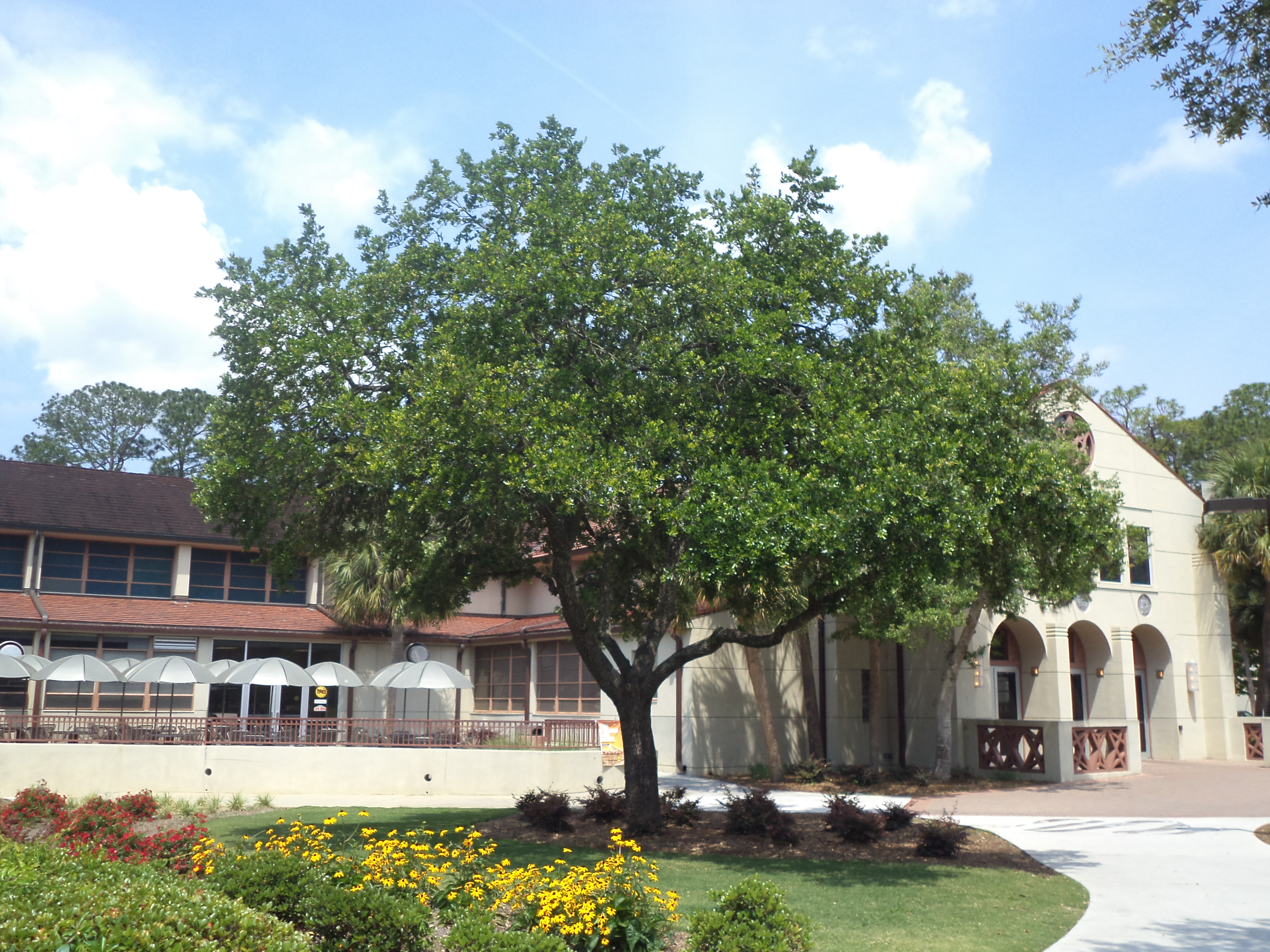
Quercus virginiana (Live oak), the state tree at Valdosta State University

- Amphibian: American green tree frog
- Bird: brown thrasher
- Crop: peanut
- Fish: largemouth bass
- Flower: Cherokee rose
- Fruit: peach
- Gem: quartz
- Insect: honey bee
- Mammal: white-tailed deer
- Marine mammal: right whale
- Mineral: staurolite
- Nicknames:
  - "Peach State"
  - "Empire State of the South"
- Reptile: gopher tortoise
- Song: "Georgia on My Mind"
- Tree: live oak
- Vegetable: Vidalia onion

Reference: Georgia Symbols

== See also ==
- Index of Georgia (U.S. state)-related articles
- Outline of Georgia (U.S. state)
- USS Georgia, 2 ships

== Bibliography ==
- Bartley, Numan V. The Creation of Modern Georgia (1990). Covers 1865–1990 period. ISBN 0-8203-1183-9.
- Coleman, Kenneth. ed. A History of Georgia (1991). ISBN 0-8203-1269-X.
- London, Bonnie Bullard. (2005) Georgia and the American Experience Atlanta, Georgia: Clairmont Press ISBN 1-56733-100-9. A middle school textbook.
- Peirce, Neal R. The Deep South States of America: People, Politics, and Power in the Seven Deep South States (1974). Information on politics and economics 1960–72. ISBN 0-393-05496-9.
- Williams, David and Christopher C. Meyers. Georgia: A Brief History Macon: Mercer University Press, 2012.

Preceded by New Jersey	List of U.S. states by date of admission to the Union; Ratified Constitution on January 2, 1788 (4th)	Succeeded by Connecticut
