= Transportation in Georgia (U.S. state) =

Overview
- Transit type: Rapid transit, commuter rail, buses, private automobile, Taxicab, bicycle, pedestrian, ferries

Operation
- Operator: GDOT

The transportation system of Georgia is a cooperation of complex systems of infrastructure comprising over 1,200 miles (1,900 km) of Interstates and more than 120 airports and airbases serving a regional population of 59,425 people.

== Mass transit ==
=== MARTA ===
Map of the MARTA rail system

MARTA is composed of both heavy rail rapid transit and a bus transit system that operates primarily within the boundaries of Clayton, DeKalb, and Fulton counties. In addition to Atlanta itself, the transit agency serves the following incorporated places within these core counties: Alpharetta, Avondale Estates, Chamblee, Clarkston, College Park, Decatur, Doraville, Dunwoody, East Point, Fairburn, Forest Park, Hapeville, Jonesboro, Lithonia, Lovejoy, Morrow, Palmetto, Pine Hill, Riverdale, Roswell, Sandy Springs, Stone Mountain, and Union City. Outside of the immediate service area, MARTA also operates one bus route to Cobb County's Cumberland Boulevard Transfer Center.

In 2015, MARTA resumed bus service to Clayton County after a referendum in which the county agreed to a 1% sales tax increase to fund MARTA's return to most of the county (Airport Station is located in Clayton County but is not easily accessible for non-airport patrons), which had been without public transit service since the closure of C-TRAN in 2010. Introducing some form of high-capacity transit service (MARTA heavy rail, commuter rail, light rail, or bus rapid transit) into Clayton County is currently being studied by MARTA.

=== Rail ===
Amtrak maintains two rail lines through Georgia, with the Crescent: Birmingham, Alabama to Greenville, South Carolina traveling through Atlanta, Gainesville, and Toccoa, and another line with the Silver Service: traveling from Charleston, South Carolina to Jacksonville, Florida, traveling through the two cities of Savannah and Jesup. Up to the late 1960s, Atlanta had been a passenger train hub, with trains (in addition to the present-day Crescent route) to Chicago and Florida at Terminal Station and Union Station.

Major freight railroads in Georgia include CSX and Norfolk Southern Railway. Passenger service in Georgia is available on two Amtrak routes: the Crescent, which travels from New York to Washington, D.C., through North Georgia and Atlanta to New Orleans and the other, Silver Meteor / Silver Star, travels from New York to the Georgia coast and from there to Florida.

The River Street Streetcar is a heritage streetcar line in Savannah. It began regular operation on February 11, 2009, and shuttles between seven stops along River Street, next to the Savannah River.

The Beltline is a former railway corridor around the core of Atlanta, which is under development in stages as a multi-use trail. Using existing rail track easements, it aims to improve not only transportation, but to add green space and promote redevelopment. There are longer-term visions for streetcar or light rail lines along all or part of the corridor.

=== Bus ===
Georgia lacks a united bus system and is instead, served by various separate systems that serve various areas of the state.

System	Area	Description
MARTA	Metropolitan Atlanta	MARTA's (Metropolitan Atlanta Rapid Transit Authority) bus system serves a wider area than the rail system, serving areas in Fulton, Clayton, and DeKalb counties such as the cities of Roswell and Alpharetta in North Fulton, along with South DeKalb and Jonesboro and Morrow in Clayton. As of 2010, MARTA has 554 diesel and compressed natural gas buses that cover over 91 bus routes which operated 25.9 million annual vehicle miles (41.7 million kilometers). Effective November 20, 2006, MARTA now has one bus route providing limited service in Cobb County (Route 12 has been extended to Cobb County's Cumberland Boulevard Transfer Center). All of the MARTA bus lines feed into or intersect MARTA rail lines as well. MARTA shuttle service is available to Six Flags Over Georgia (also in Cobb County) during the park's summer season.
CobbLinc	Cobb County	CobbLinc, formerly known as Cobb Community Transit
Ride Gwinnett	Gwinnett County	Ride Gwinnett, formerly known as Gwinnett County Transit
APT	Augusta	Augusta Public Transit
MTA	Macon-Bibb County	Macon Transit Authority. Also serves commuters to Robins Air Force Base in Houston County.
WRT	Houston County	Warner Robins Transit, serves two routes in Centerville, Warner Robins, and unincorporated Houston County.
RTD	Rome	Rome Transit Department provides public transportation within the city of Rome in Floyd County.
CAT	Savannah	Chatham Area Transit is the provider of public transportation in the Savannah, Georgia metropolitan area. The county-owned service was founded in 1986 after the collapse of previous transit providers. Buses operate 7 days a week, and 90% of county residents are within reasonable walking distance of a route.
ACCT	Athens	Athens-Clarke County Transit, formerly branded as The Bus, serves Athens (while University of Georgia Campus Transit serves the UGA campus specifically).

== Roads and freeways ==
=== Interstate highways ===
I-95 shield

The state of Georgia has 1,244 miles (2,002 km) of Interstate Highways within its borders. Georgia's major Interstate Highways are Interstate 16 (I-16), I-20, I-75, I-85, and I-95. Other important interstate highways are I-24 and I-59. I-285 is Atlanta, Georgia's perimeter route and I-575 connects counties in North Georgia to I-75. The Georgia Department of Transportation maintains only 16% of the roads in the state. The other 84% are the responsibility of the counties and cities; 75% of those roads are county roads.

All of Georgia's Interstate highways are as follows:

- I-16
  - I-516
- I-20
  - I-520
- I-24
- I-59
- I-75
  - I-175 (former proposal)
  - I-475
  - I-575
  - I-675
- I-85
  - I-185
  - I-285
  - I-985
- I-95

=== U.S. highways ===
U.S. Route 1 shield

The state of Georgia has an extensive system of U.S. Highways.

All of Georgia's U.S. Highways are as follows:

- US 1
  - US 301
- US 11
  - US 411
- US 17
- US 19
  - US 319
- US 23
  - US 123
- US 25
- US 27
- US 29
  - US 129
- US 41
  - US 341
  - US 441
- US 76
- US 78
  - US 278
  - US 378
- US 80
  - US 280
- US 82
- US 84
- US 221

=== State routes ===
The state of Georgia has an extensive system of state routes.

=== Bridges and tunnels ===
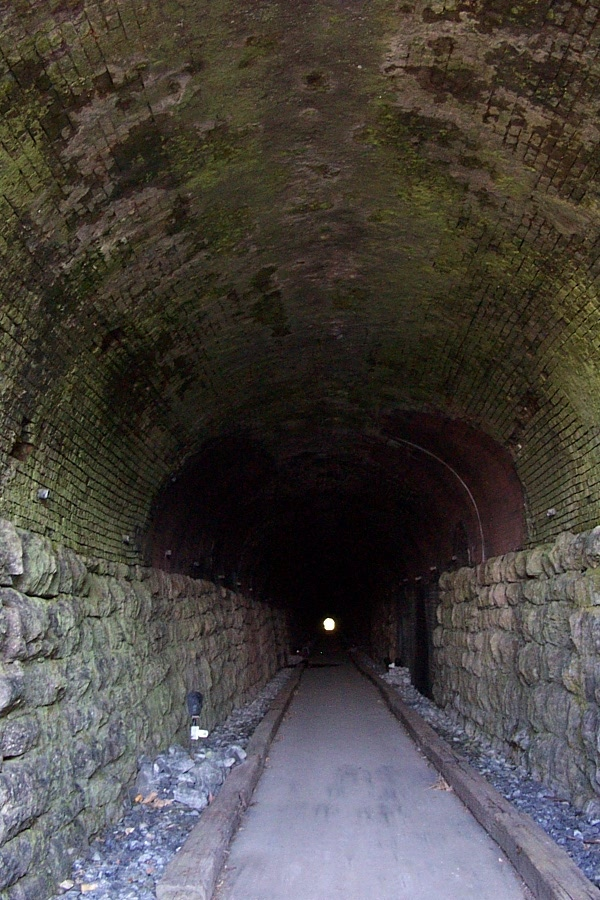
Brick-lined interior of the W&A tunnel, now preserved as a walking trail, looking southeast

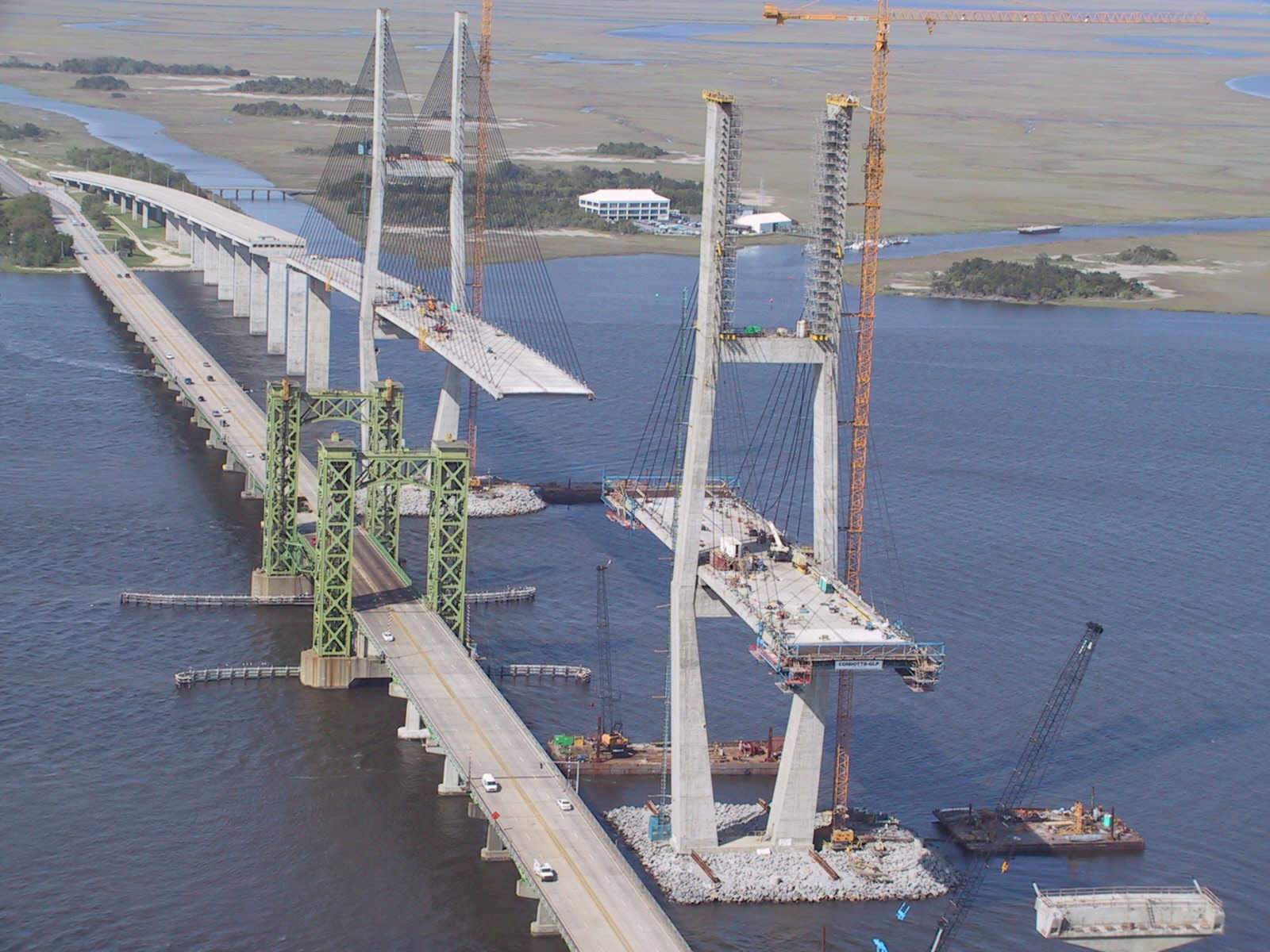
Sidney Lanier Bridge, April 2001

The Sidney Lanier Bridge is a cable-stayed bridge that spans the Brunswick River in Brunswick, carrying four lanes of US 17/SR 25. The current bridge was built as a replacement to the original lift bridge which was twice struck by ships. It is currently the longest-spanning bridge in Georgia and is 480 feet (150 m) tall. It is also the 76th-largest cable-stayed bridge in the world. It was named for poet Sidney Lanier. Each year (usually in February), there is the "Bridge Run" sponsored by Southeast Georgia Health System when the south side of the bridge is closed to traffic and people register to run (or walk) the bridge.

The Chetoogeta Mountain Tunnel refers to two different railroad tunnels traveling through Chetoogeta Mountain in the northwestern part of the state. The first tunnel was completed on May 7, 1850, as part of the construction of the Western and Atlantic Railroad (W & A), the first state road in Georgia. It was the first major railroad tunnel in the Southern United States and is 1,447 feet (441 m) in length. It was renovated in 1998-2000 and is now open to the public as a privately owned historic site. The second tunnel was built from 1926 to 1928 and is 1,557 feet (0.2949 mi; 475 m) long. It is still in use by CSX Transportation, under lease from the Georgia Department of Transportation. It, like the entire W & A subdivision, is a major route between Atlanta and Chattanooga.

The nearby town of Tunnel Hill, Georgia (originally Tunnelsville) was founded and named for the first tunnel, and was the supply base for its construction materials and worker housing.

== Personal transportation ==
Georgia has a system of State Bicycle Routes.

The city of Atlanta limits the number of CPNCs (Certificate of Public Necessity and Convenience) to 1,600, and is the maximum number of licensed taxis allowed within the city.

== Port infrastructure ==
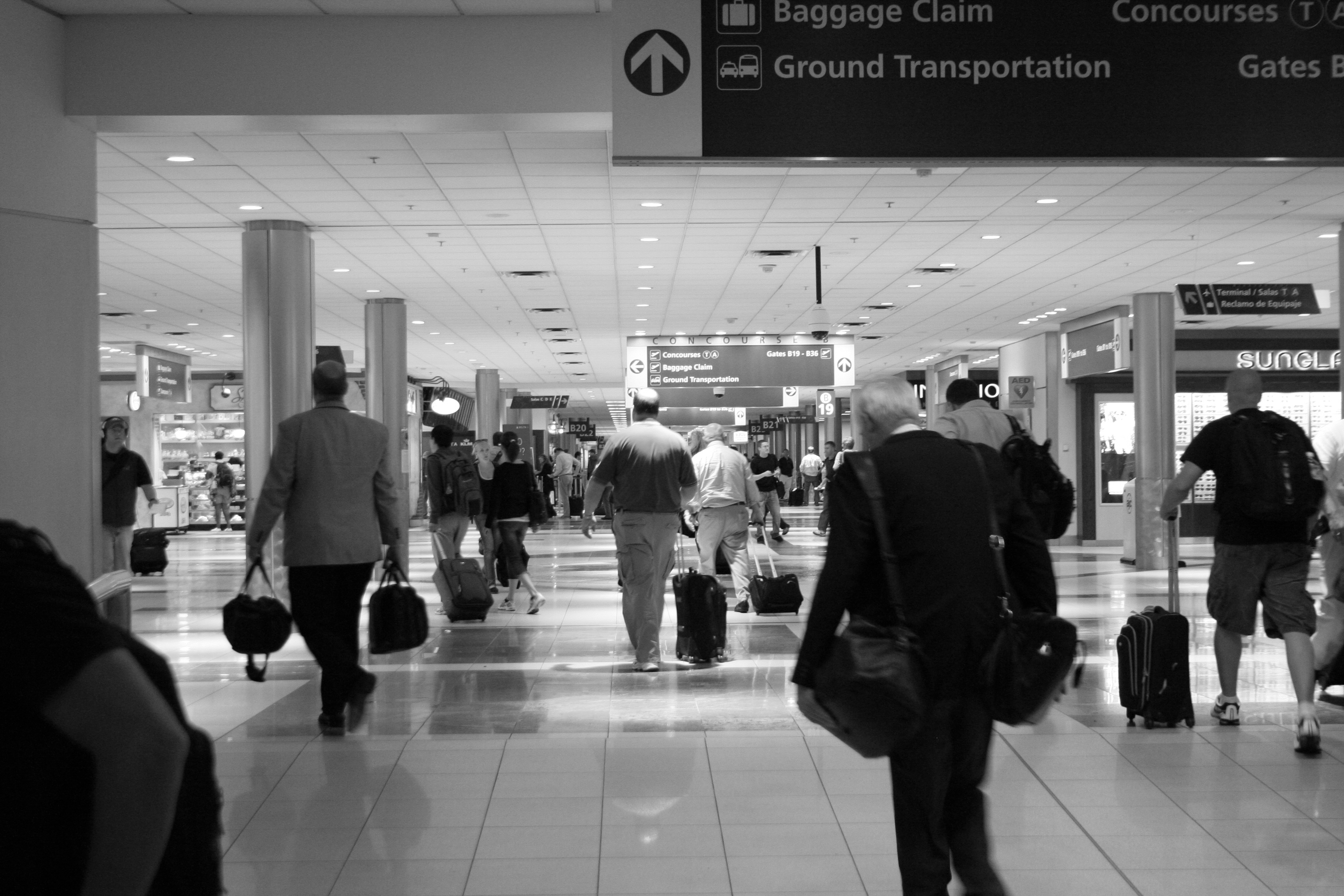
Hartsfield-Jackson Atlanta Airport is the world's busiest airport

=== Airports ===
- Hartsfield-Jackson Atlanta International Airport (IATA: ATL, ICAO: KATL), the world's busiest airport as measured by passenger traffic and by aircraft traffic, offers air service to over 150 U.S. destinations and more than 80 international destinations in 52 countries, with over 2,700 arrivals and departures daily. Delta Air Lines maintain its largest hub at the airport and is headquartered in Atlanta. Situated 10 miles (16 km) south of downtown, the airport covers most of the land inside a wedge formed by Interstate 75, Interstate 85, and Interstate 285. The MARTA rail system has a station in the airport terminal, and provides direct service to Downtown, Midtown, Buckhead, and Sandy Springs. The major general aviation airports near the city proper are DeKalb-Peachtree Airport (IATA: PDK, ICAO: KPDK) and Brown Field (IATA: FTY, ICAO: KFTY).

=== Seaports ===
The Port of Savannah is a major seaport located at Savannah. Its extensive facilities for oceangoing vessels line both sides of the Savannah River approximately 18 miles (29 km) from the Atlantic Ocean. Operated by the Georgia Ports Authority (GPA), the Port of Savannah competes primarily with the Port of Charleston in Charleston, South Carolina to the northeast, and the Port of Jacksonville in Jacksonville, Florida to the south. The GPA operates one other Atlantic seaport in Georgia, the Port of Brunswick, located at Brunswick, Georgia, as well as two interior ports linked to the Gulf of Mexico, Port Bainbridge and Port Columbus.

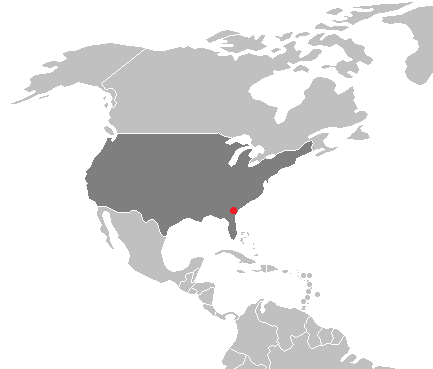
The location of the Port of Savannah

Between 2000 and 2005 alone, the Port of Savannah was the fastest-growing seaport in the United States, with a compounded annual growth rate of 16.5% (the national average is 9.7%).

== Current, future and proposed projects ==
=== Georgia Rail Passenger Program ===
The Georgia Rail Passenger Program is a plan for seven railway commuter routes to serve the Atlanta suburbs and nearby cities.

The Athens route will connect nine of Georgia's colleges and universities, including Georgia Institute of Technology, Georgia State University, Emory University, Georgia Gwinnett College, and the University of Georgia. Furthermore, the commuter rail will link the Centers for Disease Control, the new Paul D. Coverdell Center for Biomedical and Health Sciences, as well as the emerging BioScience Corridor along Georgia State Route 316.

The route is estimated to divert 1.8 million drivers from the highways by 2025. As many as 8,000 individuals or more could conceivably use the system every day, and it could remove 5,300 cars daily from already overtaxed roadways during peak travel times. Also, previous studies have indicated that commuter rail is 25 times safer than driving.

== See also ==
- Plug-in electric vehicles in Georgia (U.S. state)
- Transportation in the United States
