= List of ports in Georgia (state) =

This is a list of ports in Georgia. There are two international seaports and three dry ports. All of these ports are maintained by the Georgia Ports Authority.

== Seaports ==
| Image | Name | Location | Description |
|---|---|---|---|
| | Port of Savannah | 32.128705°N 81.151907°W | Third busiest port in the United States. Facilitates oceangoing vessels from both sides of the Savannah River and from the Atlantic Ocean. Consists of two terminals, Garden City Terminal and Ocean Terminal. |
| | Port of Brunswick | 31.1290591°N 81.5440113°W | An Atlantic seport in Brunswick, Georgia. The busiest port for automobiles in the US. Ford, GM and Mercedes export vehicles through Port of Brunswick. Consists of three terminals, Colonel's Island Terminal, Mayor's Point Terminal, and East River Terminal and Lanier Dock. |

== Dry ports ==
| Image | Name | Location | Description |
|---|---|---|---|
| | Appalachian Regional Port | 34.900563°N 84.747605°W | A container truck-to-rail transload facility in Murray County, Georgia. This inland port serves additional markets in Alabama and Tennessee and is connected to the Port of Savannah by a 388-mile CSX-operated railroad route. |
| | Bainbridge Inland Port | 30.898°N 84.607°W | Located in Bainbridge, Georgia, it handles sea trade and cargo shipments to and from the Gulf of Mexico via Florida's Apalachicola River. |
| | Northeast Georgia Inland Port | 34.900563°N 84.747605°W | An inland port which opened in 2021 that provides a direct link to the Port of Savannah via Norfolk Southern. |
