= Roads in Georgia =

Roads in Georgia may refer to:

- Roads in Georgia (country)
- Roads in Georgia (U.S. state)

== See also ==
- List of roads in Georgia (disambiguation)
