= List of ports in Georgia =

List of ports in Georgia may refer to:

- List of ports in Georgia (country)
- List of ports in Georgia (U.S. state)
