= Transport in Georgia =

Transport in Georgia may refer to:

- Transport in Georgia (country)
- Transportation in Georgia (U.S. state)
