= List of roads in Georgia =

List of roads in Georgia may refer to:

- List of roads in Georgia (country)
- List of Interstate Highways in Georgia
- List of U.S. Highways in Georgia
- List of state routes in Georgia
  - List of former state routes in Georgia

== See also ==
- Roads in Georgia (disambiguation)
