= Jasper Ocean Terminal =

Planned port in South Carolina

Coordinates: 32°5′5″N 80°58′16″W

Jasper Ocean Terminal (JOT)
- Website: https://www.thejasperoceanterminal.com

The Jasper Ocean Terminal (JOT) is a planned deepwater container port that will be built in South Carolina on the Savannah River, about 10 miles (16 km) downstream from Savannah, Georgia. JOT is planned to open between 2035 and 2037. The terminal was originally planned because additional capacity was needed by both the Georgia Ports Authority (GPA) and the South Carolina Ports Authority (SCPA). However, the SCPA transferred its half-interest in the property to Jasper County in 2021. The GPA has until September, 2021, to state whether it will develop the port with Jasper County officials. The SCPA cited differing markets as the main cause for pulling out of the deal.

The project has been in various stages of planning since 2007 and in 2008 the GPA and SCPA signed an early agreement to jointly build and operate the facility. However, political tensions regarding plans to dredge the river slowed progress, and little money was invested—by 2016 only about $10 million had spent on planning and permits. In November 2015, the ports authorities signed an updated agreement to develop the terminal, and in late 2016 a new round of design work began, with an estimated $100 million cost. In January 2017, the Army Corps of Engineers began the environmental impact statement for the dockside portion of Jasper Terminal. The total cost of building the port is estimated at $4.5 billion.

At full build-out, JOT will cover 1,500 acres, with ten berths. It will be dredged to a 55 feet (17 m) depth, able to accommodate ships carrying as many as 20,000 TEU containers, with an annual capacity of seven million TEUs. Access to the facility will be via a new four lane highway connecting to US Route 17, and rail connections to both CSX Transportation and Norfolk Southern Railway lines.

== See also ==
- List of container ports in the United States
