= Port of Charleston =

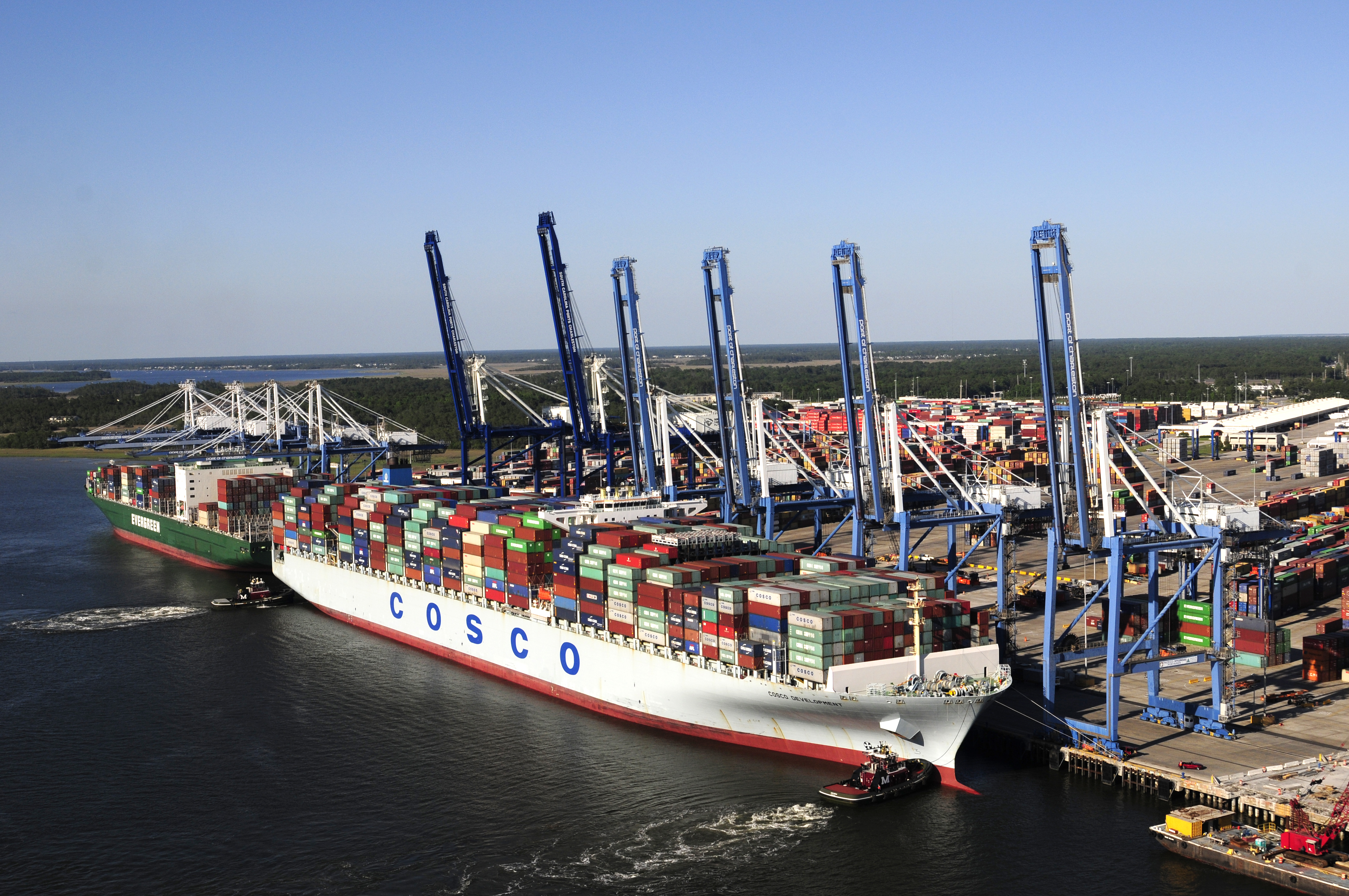
- Interactive map of Port of Charleston

Location
- Country: United States
- Location: Charleston, South Carolina, USA
- Coordinates: 32.7846°N 79.924°W

Details
- Operated by: South Carolina Ports Authority
- Owned by: South Carolina Ports Authority
- Type of Harbor: Container, breakbulk
- Draft depth: 45 feet (14 m)
- Air draft: Unrestricted at one pier; 185 feet, restricted by Arthur Ravenel Jr. Bridge; 155 feet, restricted by Don N. Holt Bridge

Statistics
- Annual container volume: 2.85 million TEUs in Fiscal Year 2022
- Value of cargo: $72 billion in Calendar Year 2020
- Website https://www.scspa.com

The Port of Charleston is a seaport located in South Carolina in the Southeastern United States. The port's facilities span two municipalities— North Charleston, and Mount Pleasant—with four public terminals owned and operated by the South Carolina Ports Authority (SCPA). These facilities handle containers, motor vehicles and other rolling stock, non-containerized goods and project cargo] operation. Additional facilities in the port are privately owned and operated, handling bulk commodities like petroleum, coal and steel.

== Early history ==
Charleston's earliest history is tied to its prominence as a center of trade. After establishing Charles Towne along the banks of the Ashley River in 1670, the original settlers moved to the Charleston peninsula, favoring that location's natural harbor. By 1682 Charles Towne was declared the port of entry for the colony. From the founding of the colony until the start of the American Civil War, the colony's principal exports were lumber and naval stores, furs and animal skins, rice, indigo, cotton, and tobacco; and imports of primarily African slaves until the late 1700s. As a result of this trade, the colony flourished.

The Port of Charleston later suffered in the wake of the Civil War. The harbor itself was in shambles and filled with mines and the wrecks of sunken Confederate and Union ships. The Southern economy had little to export and Charleston's network of private wharves were neglected and left to ruin. The establishment of several major federal military bases during the early 20th century benefited Charleston Harbor tremendously. Because of this federal presence, the harbor itself was well-maintained and greatly improved over the years. Mayor John P. Grace brought renewed interest in reviving the Port of Charleston's shipping presence by establishing the Port Utilities Commission in the early 1920s. In 1922 the city purchased the Charleston Terminal Company, which owned the majority of the peninsula's commercial waterfront assets, for $1.5 million. In 1942, the South Carolina Legislature established the South Carolina Ports Authority with the responsibility to foster waterborne commerce for the benefit of the State of South Carolina.

== Ranking, volume and investments ==
In 2020, the Port of Charleston ranked as the 6th port in the United States by cargo value, with over $72 billion in imports and exports traded across the docks. The Port of Charleston hosts shipping services by all of the globe's top container carriers. In fiscal year 2021, the Port of Charleston handled 2.85 million twenty-foot equivalent container units (TEUs).

The South Carolina Ports Authority invested $1.05 billion in new and existing facilities between Fiscal Years 2016 and 2020, including Phase 1 of the recently opened Hugh K. Leatherman Terminal, as well as major improvements to existing facilities, technology upgrades, and two inland ports in Greer and Dillon. Today, the Port of Charleston boasts the deepest water in the southeast region and regularly handles post-Panamax vessels passing through the newly expanded Panama Canal. A harbor deepening project was completed, which makes the Port of Charleston's entrance channel to 54 feet (16 m) and harbor channel to 52 feet at mean low tide. With an average high tide of 6 feet (1.8 m), the depth clearances will become 60 feet (18 m) and 58 feet respectively. At 52 feet (16 m), the Port of Charleston is the deepest harbor on the East Coast.

In response to the growth in traffic at both Charleston and Savannah, Georgia, the State of South Carolina plans to build the Jasper Ocean Terminal on the South Carolina side of the Savannah River by 2035.

== Terminals in the Port of Charleston ==
Port of Charleston terminal locations
1 Union Pier Terminal/Cruise Terminal
2 Columbus Street Terminal
3 Wando Welch Terminal
4 Hugh K. Leatherman Terminal
5 Veterans Terminal
6 North Charleston Terminal
- Union Pier Terminal: This facility, located in the City of Charleston and also home of cruise ship operations, handles forest products, metals, heavy equipment, project cargo and other traditional break-bulk commodities on 2,470-foot (753 m) of berth at a depth of MLW of 35-foot (11 m). The 65-acre (0 km^{2}) facility features 500,000-square-foot (46,452 m^{2}) of dry storage.
- Columbus Street Terminal: This facility, located in the City of Charleston, handles project cargo, break-bulk, and roll-on/roll-off cargo on 3,500-foot (1,067 m) of berth at a depth of MLW of 45-foot (14 m). The 155-acre (1 km^{2}) facility features 359,149-square-foot (33,366 m^{2}) of dry storage and 44.3-acre (0 km^{2}) of Ro-Ro acreage.
- Wando Welch Terminal: This facility, located in the town of Mount Pleasant, handles container vessels of all size on 3,800-foot (1,158 m) of berth at a depth of MLW of 45-foot (14 m). The 400-acre (2 km^{2}) facility features 20,074 grounded and 3,417 wheeled container slots with 1,274 reefer slots.
- Veterans Terminal: This facility, located in the City of North Charleston, handles bulk, break-bulk, RO-RO, and project cargo on 4 finger piers at a depth of MLW of 35-foot (11 m). The 110-acre (0 km^{2}) facility features 96,993-square-foot (9,011 m^{2}) of dry storage and paved open storage.
- North Charleston Terminal: This facility, located in the City of North Charleston, handles container cargo, specializes in handling container ships 8,000 TEU and smaller, on 2,460-foot (750 m) of berth at a depth of MLW of 45-foot (14 m). The 201-acre (1 km^{2}) facility features 11,316 grounded and 2,854 wheeled container slots with 538 reefer slots.
- Hugh K. Leatherman Terminal: This facility, located in the City of North Charleston, opened in March 2021 and handles container cargo. It can handle container ships of up to 20,000 TEU. At full buildout, this terminal will increase port capacity by 50%.

== Big ship ready ==
The South Carolina Ports Authority (SCPA) is investing hundreds of millions of dollars into the Port of Charleston and constructing a new port terminal. In 2011, state senator Hugh Leatherman was responsible for securing $300 million in state funding for the deepening of Charleston Harbor. On March 2, 2018, construction officially began to deepen Charleston's harbor from 45 to 52 feet deep, with completion expected within the decade.

On May 28, 2021, the CMA CGM MARCO POLO, the largest container ship to ever call the U.S. East Coast, made Charleston its last port of call in the United States before heading back to Asia. The ship is 1,300 feet long, can haul as many as 16,022 containers, and is part of the Columbus JAX service. The MARCO POLO made stops in Halifax, New York and New Jersey, Norfolk, Virginia, Savannah, Georgia, and South Carolina, before returning to Asia. U.S. Ports have made plans to expand following the $5.4 billion Panama Canal shipping lane that opened in 2016.

== Cruise Terminal and Union Pier redevelopment ==
Cruise operations in the Port of Charleston are part of the South Carolina Ports Authority's legislated mandate to increase maritime commerce. A study commissioned by the South Carolina Ports Authority projected that cruise operations could support 407 jobs and $37 million in economic benefits in 2010 in the Tri-County. In May 2010, the Carnival Fantasy began home-porting the Carnival Fantasy in the Port of Charleston, until February 2016, when the Carnival Fantasy was replaced by the Carnival Ecstasy. In May 2019, the Carnival Sunshine began home-porting in the Port of Charleston, replacing the Carnival Ecstasy.

To better handle ships, passengers, traffic and security requirements, SC Ports identified a need to improve and enhance the cruise terminal, which opened in 1973. Cruise ships have called Union Pier since 1913. The Ports Authority began hosting meetings, telling the community on how the agency envisioned to best develop an improved cruise facility. Through an extensive public process, including more than 100 meetings with neighbors and other stakeholder groups, the resulting Union Pier Concept Plan, which called for the refurbishment of an existing warehouse on the North end of Union Pier, was endorsed unanimously by City Council in September 2010 and approved by the City of Charleston Board of Architectural Review.

== See also ==
- United States container ports
- Joint Base Charleston
- Charleston Naval Shipyard
