= Port of Savannah =

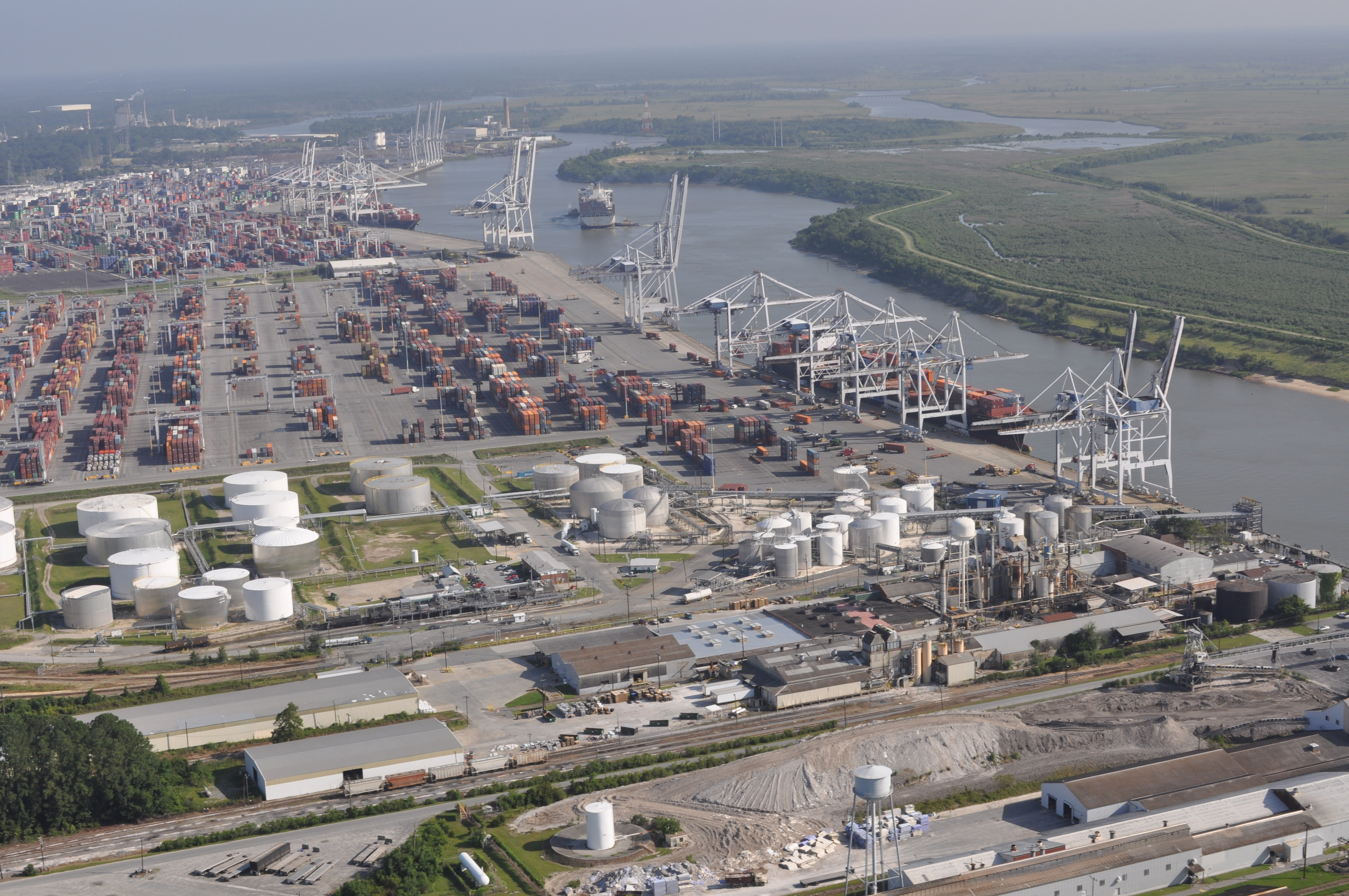
- View of the Garden City Terminal and other port-related facilities to the left of the Savannah River
- Interactive map of Port of Savannah

Location
- Country: United States of America
- Location: Georgia, U.S.A.
- Coordinates: 32.128705°N 81.151907°W
- UN/LOCODE: USSAV

Details
- Opened: 1744
- Owned by: Georgia Ports Authority
- Type of Harbor: river natural
- Draft depth: Depth 47 feet (14 m)
- Air draft: 185 feet, restricted by Talmadge Memorial Bridge

Statistics
- Annual cargo tonnage: 37.77 million (FY2020)
- Website https://gaports.com/facilities/port-of-savannah/

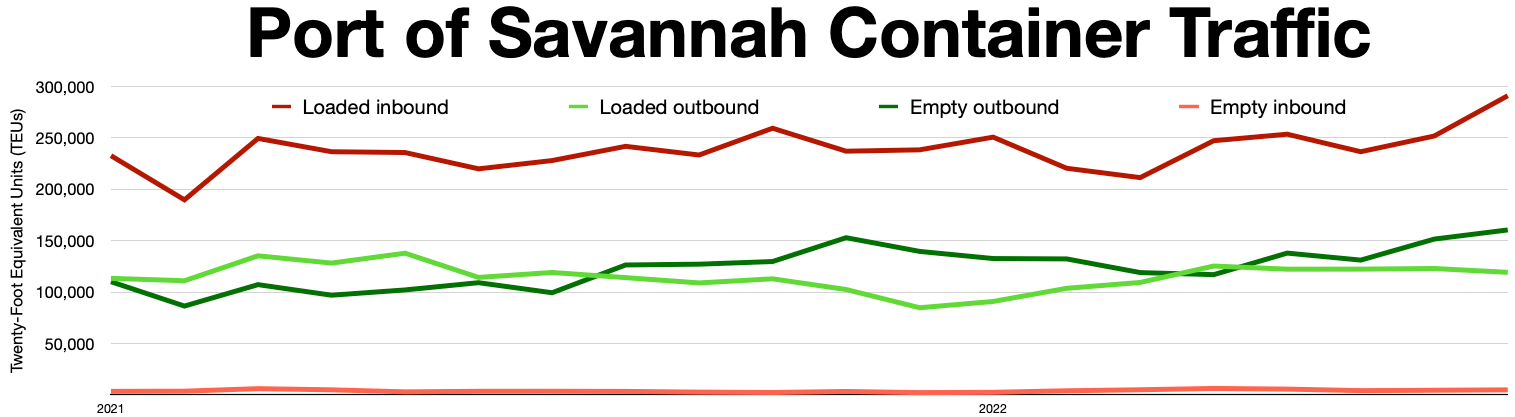
Port of savannah container traffic Loaded Imports Empty Exports Loaded Exports Empty Imports

The Port of Savannah is a major U.S. seaport located at Savannah, Georgia. Its facilities for oceangoing vessels line both sides of the Savannah River and are approximately 18 miles (29 km) from the Atlantic Ocean. Operated by the Georgia Ports Authority (GPA), the Port of Savannah competes primarily with the Port of Charleston in Charleston, South Carolina to the northeast, and the Port of Jacksonville in Jacksonville, Florida to the south. The GPA operates one other Atlantic seaport in Georgia, the Port of Brunswick. The state also manages three interior ports linked to the Gulf of Mexico: Port Bainbridge, Port Columbus, and a facility at Cordele, Georgia linked by rail to the Port of Savannah. In the 1950s, the Port of Savannah was the only facility to see an increase in trade while the country experienced a decline in trade of 5%. It was chaired and led by engineer Dr. Blake Van Leer (who also led the US Corps of Engineers).

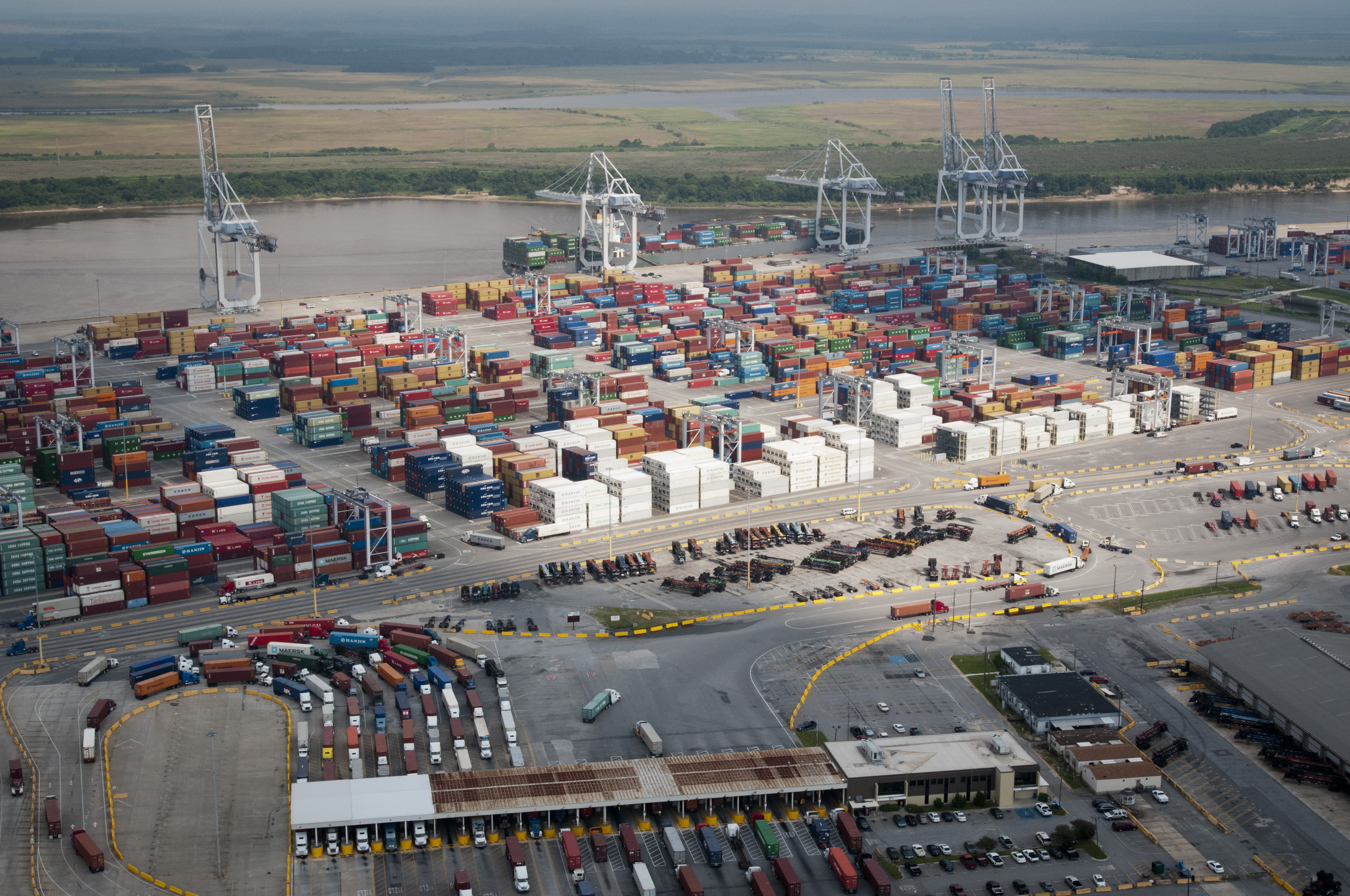
Port of Savannah

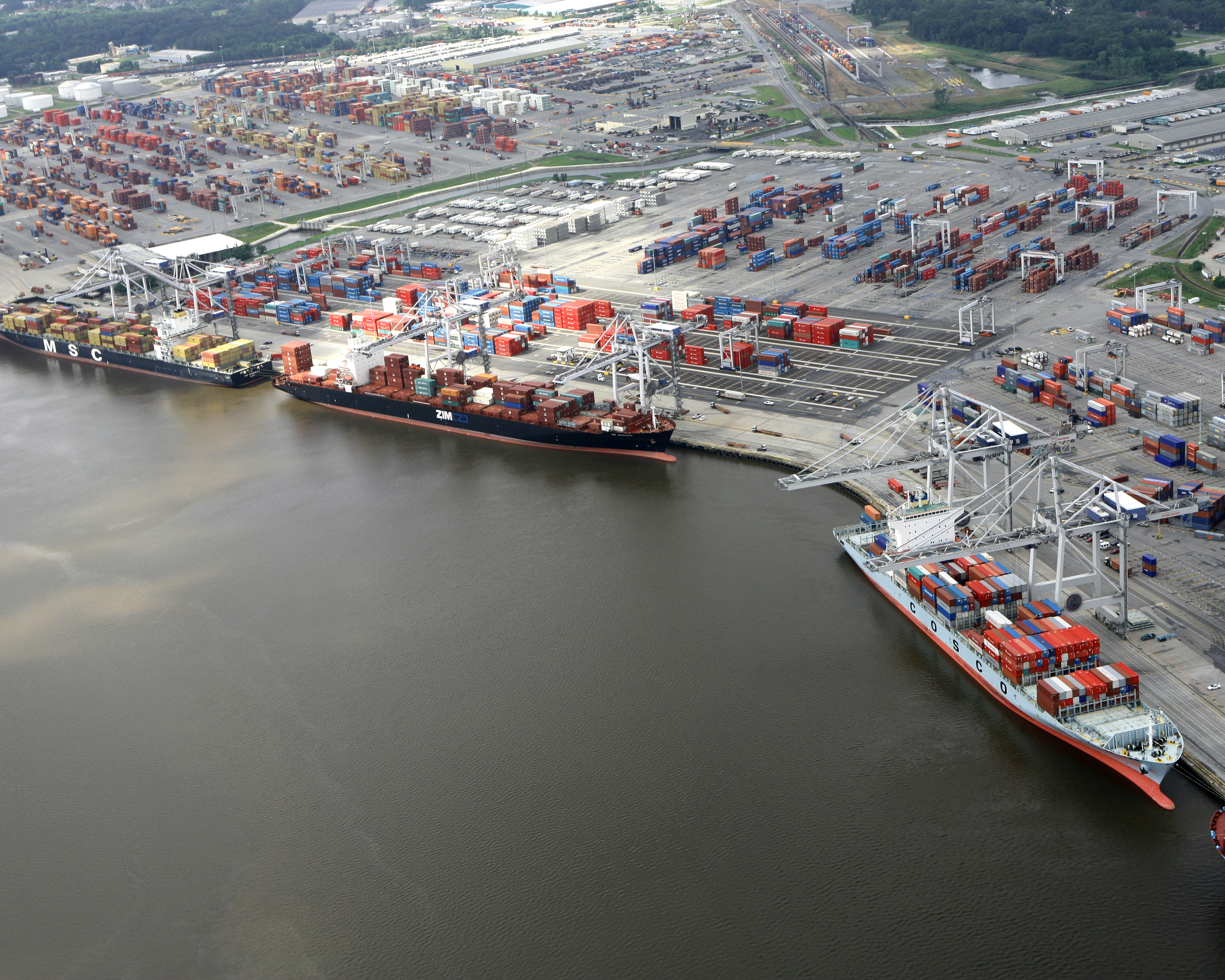
Port of Savannah

Between 2000 and 2005 alone, the Port of Savannah was the fastest-growing seaport in the United States, with a compounded annual growth rate of 16.5 percent (the national average is 9.7 percent). On July 30, 2007, the GPA announced that the Port of Savannah had a record year in fiscal 2007, becoming the fourth-busiest and fastest-growing container terminal in the U.S. As of 2021, the port was the third-busiest container port in the United States (if Los Angeles and Long Beach are considered the same port). The GPA handled more than 2.3 million twenty-foot equivalent units (TEU) of container traffic during fiscal 2007–a 14.5 percent increase and a new record for containers handled at the Port of Savannah. In the past five years, the port's container traffic has jumped 55 percent from 1.5 million TEU handled in fiscal 2003 to 2.3 million TEU in fiscal 2007. By 2014, container traffic was up to 3 million TEU. In 2018, the Port handled a record 4.35 million TEU, a 7.5 percent increase over 2017.

In response to the growth in traffic at both Savannah and the Port of Charleston, the Jasper Ocean Terminal, which would be the largest port in the country if it is completed, is planned to be built upriver on the Savannah River by the mid-2020s.

== Major facilities ==
Port of Savannah terminal locations
1 Ocean Terminal
2 Garden City Terminal

The Port of Savannah was unable to accommodate further terminal growth, which caused it to develop satellite terminal facilities and inland distribution. These facilities include:

- Garden City Terminal: Owned and operated by the GPA, the Garden City Terminal is a secured, dedicated container terminal, the largest single-operator container terminal in North America. The 1,345-acre (5 km^{2}) facility features 9,693 feet (2,955 m) of continuous berthing and more than 1.1 million square feet (104,000 m^{2}) of covered storage. The terminal is equipped with thirty-six high-speed container cranes (30 super post-Panamax and 6 post-Panamax), as well as an extensive inventory of yard handling equipment.
- Ocean Terminal: Also owned and operated by the GPA, the Ocean Terminal is a secured, dedicated breakbulk facility specializing in the rapid and efficient handling of a vast array of forest and solid wood products, steel, RoRo (Roll-on / Roll-off), project shipments and heavy-lift cargoes. The 200.8-acre (0.8 km^{2}) facility features 3,599 feet (1,099 m) of deepwater berthing, approximately 1.425 million square feet (133,000 m^{2}) of covered storage and 99 acres (401,000 m^{2}) of open, versatile storage.
- SeaPoint Industrial Terminal Complex: In 2014, Savannah-based Dulany Industries, Inc. reached an agreement with Greenfield Environmental Savannah Trust LLC to buy the 1,600-acre former site of Kerr McGee and Tronox off East President Street, to develop the SeaPoint Complex, a sustainable multi-use industrial complex with the first privately owned commercial berth on the main shipping channel of the Savannah River.
- Target Corporation Facility: On September 21, 2005, Governor Sonny Perdue announced that Target Corporation has decided to build a two-million-square-foot import warehouse at the Savannah River International Trade Park, located four miles (6 km) from the Garden City Terminal at the Port of Savannah. The import warehouse opened on June 8, 2007, and handles overseas cargo and merchandise for Target Corporation's Southeast stores.
- IKEA Facility: On December 13 of the same year, Perdue announced that IKEA would build a 1,700,000-square-foot (160,000 m^{2}) distribution center on 115 acres (0.5 km^{2}) at the Savannah River International Trade Park. The first phase of the project consists of a 685,000-square-foot (63,600 m^{2}) facility, which opened on June 27, 2007. The company also plans to expand the initial facility by approximately 975,000 square feet (90,600 m^{2}) in the future.
- Heineken USA Facility: Heineken USA opened a distribution center in February 2008 that was built with the capacity to handle 4,000 containers a year, the equivalent of 7 million cases of Heineken and Amstel brand beverages. This location acts as the port of call for distributors in Georgia, South Carolina, North Carolina, Tennessee, Kentucky and Alabama.
- Savannah Port Terminal Railroad is a railroad in Garden City linking the terminal facilities to the Genesee & Wyoming railroad.

== Maersk Line ==
On April 10, 2007, Maersk Line reported that the line has added the Port of Savannah to its MECL2 service. With the addition, Maersk Line now has five services calling on the Port of Savannah. The MECL2 service will increase Savannah's trade with India, the Middle East and the Mediterranean basin. In 2006, Maersk Line and the GPA signed a twenty-year agreement that would make the Port of Savannah one of its primary ports of call in the South Atlantic. The MECL2 service provides direct service from Chennai/Madras, India, to act as transshipment hub for cargo to and from Visakhapatnam, Calcutta/Haldia, and Bangladesh.

== Suez Express and East Coast Savannah Express ==
On June 5, 2007, APL announced that it would have two new all-water services to the Port of Savannah, one via the Suez Canal and one via the Panama Canal. The weekly Suez Express (SZX) will provide increased capacity via Savannah to and from India and Southeast Asia, deploying eight vessels. The SZX, which will originate in Singapore, calls on Colombo, Sri Lanka, before Savannah and then returns via Jebel Ali, Port Klang and then Singapore. It takes 25 days for the SZX service to transit from Singapore to Savannah. The weekly East Coast Savannah Express (ESX), will provide increased capacity between south and central China and Savannah. The ESX will offer a transit time of 22 days from Hong Kong to Savannah, making this service the fastest available to the U.S. East Coast. The ESX originates in Ningbo then calls on Shanghai, Chiwan, Hong Kong, Panama and then Savannah, New York, Norfolk, and back to Ningbo via Panama.

== Gallery ==
=== Port in the 1920s ===
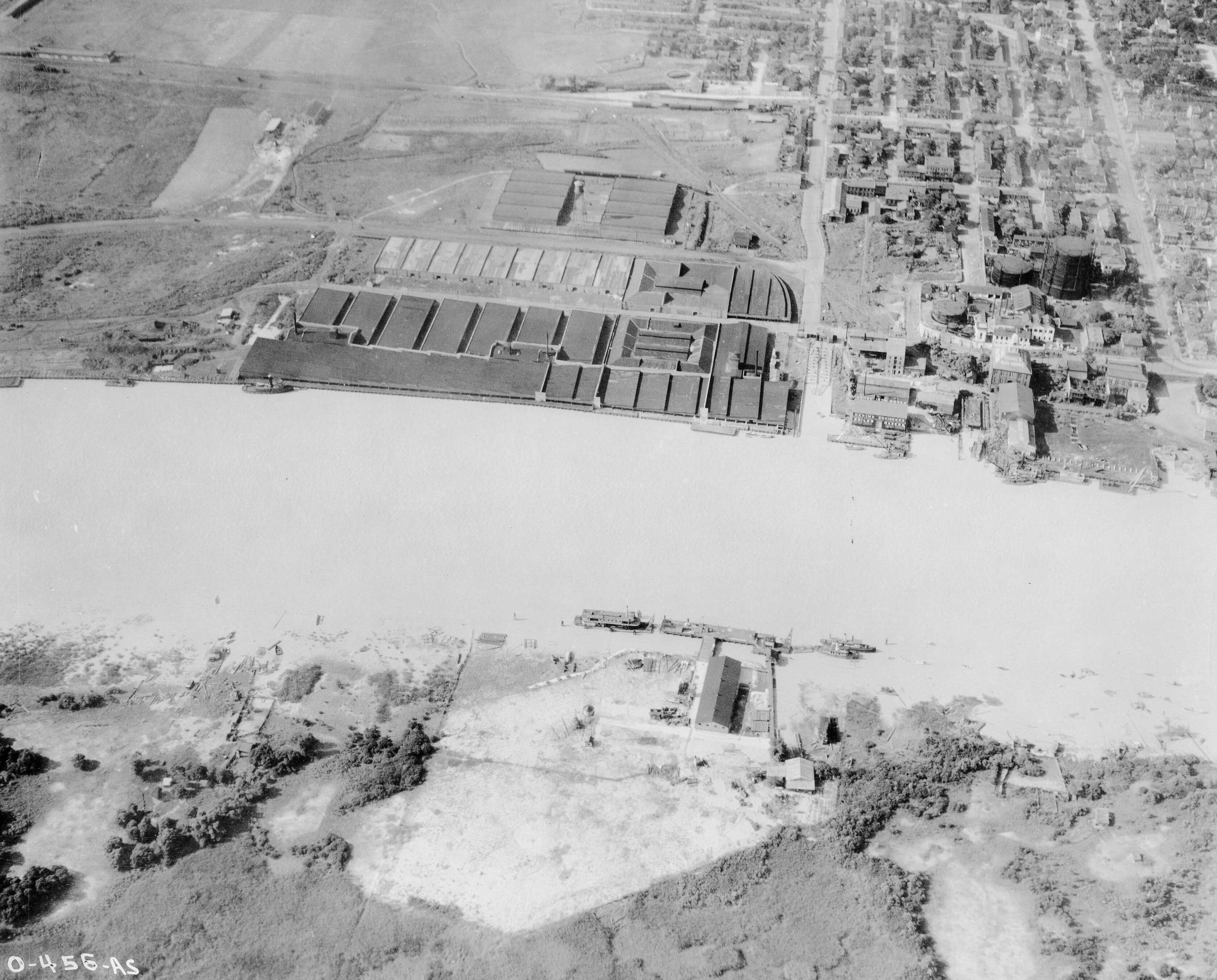

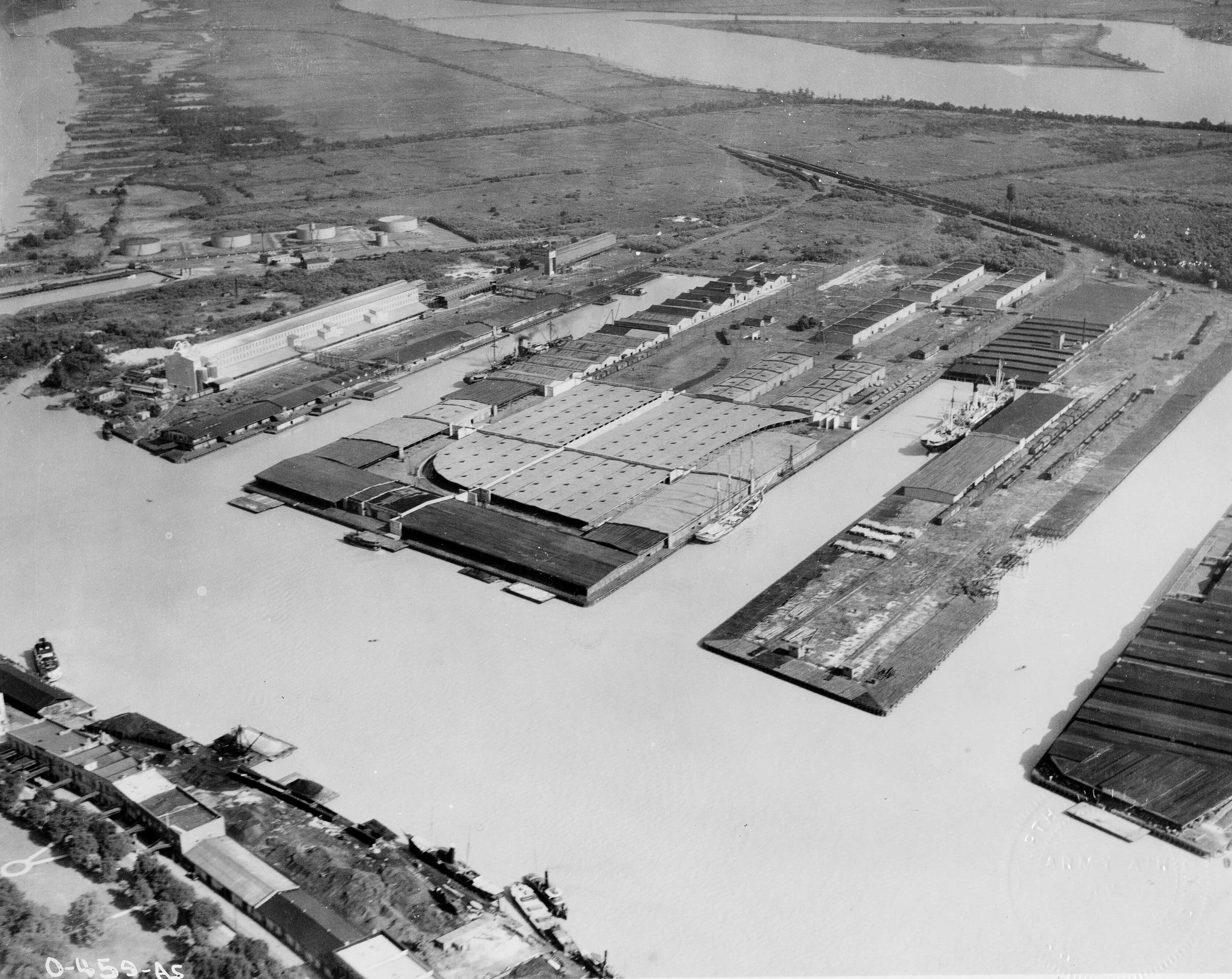

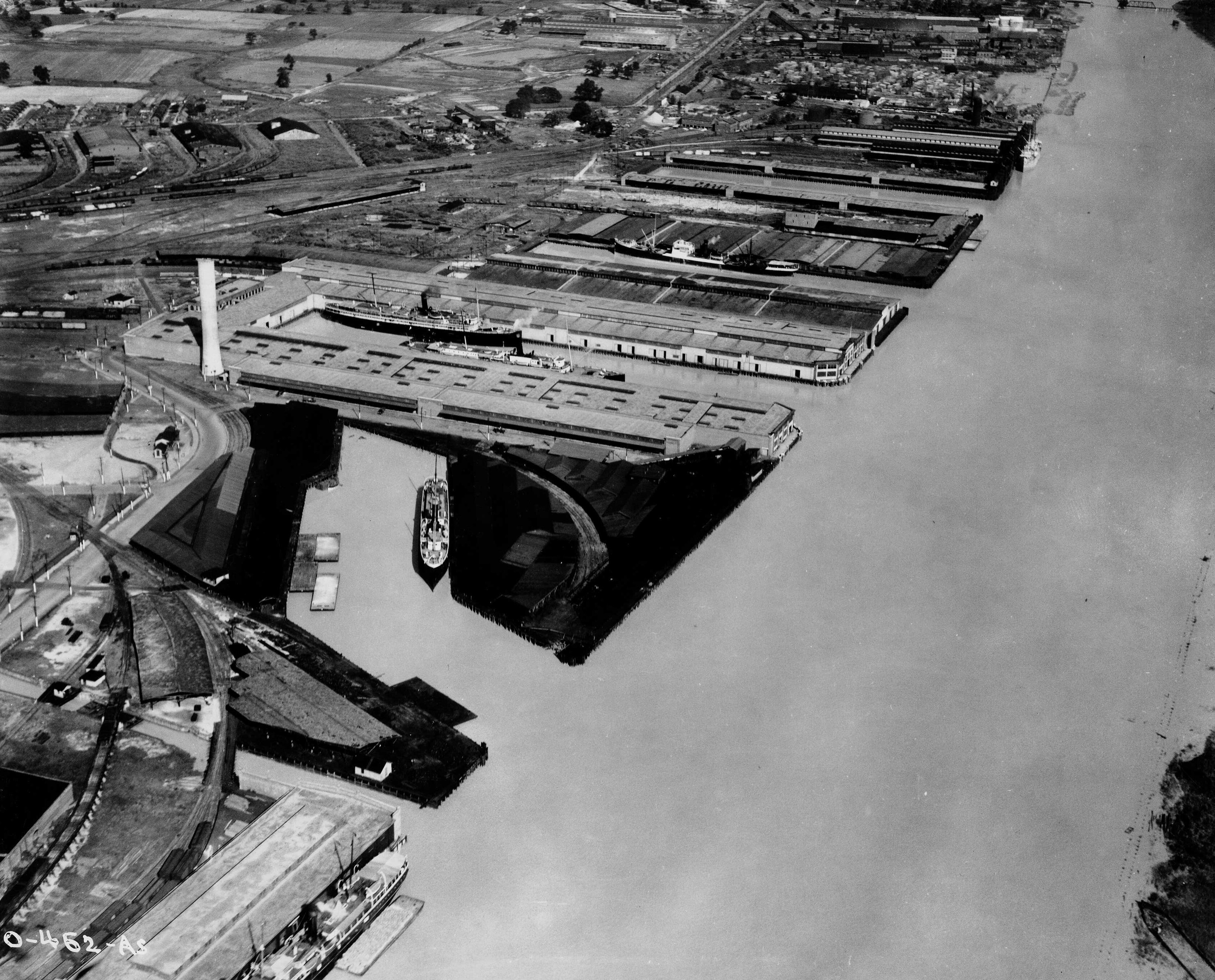

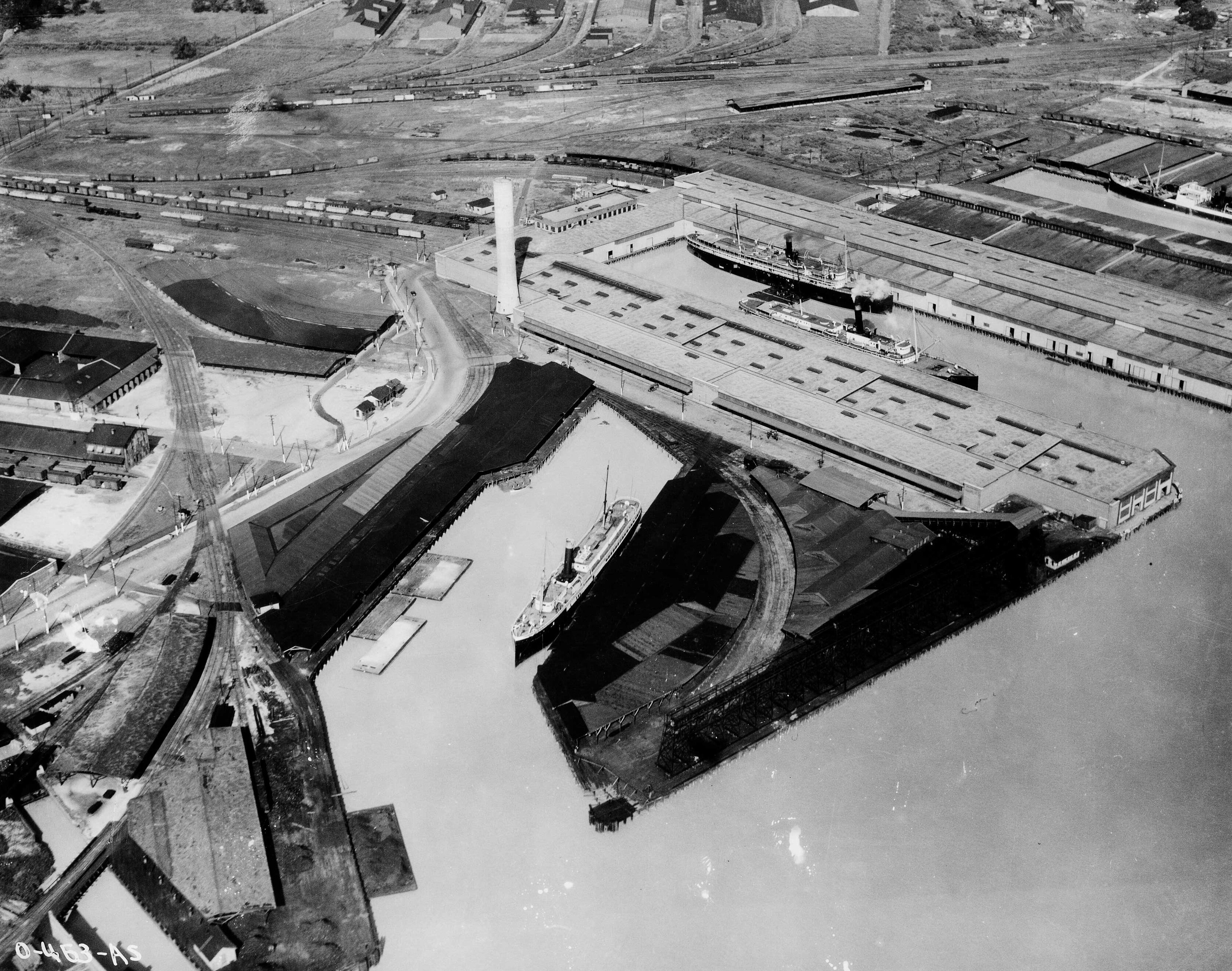

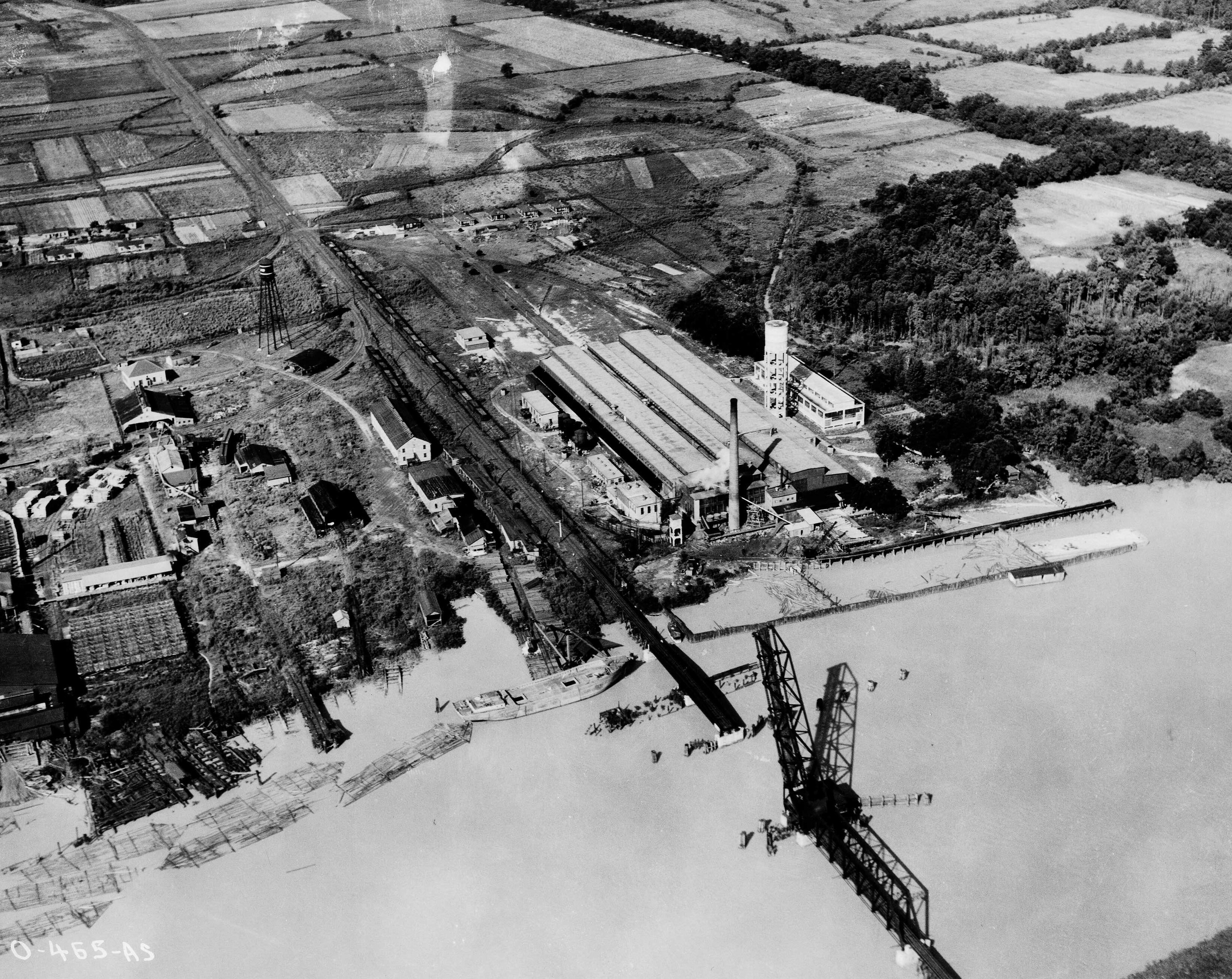

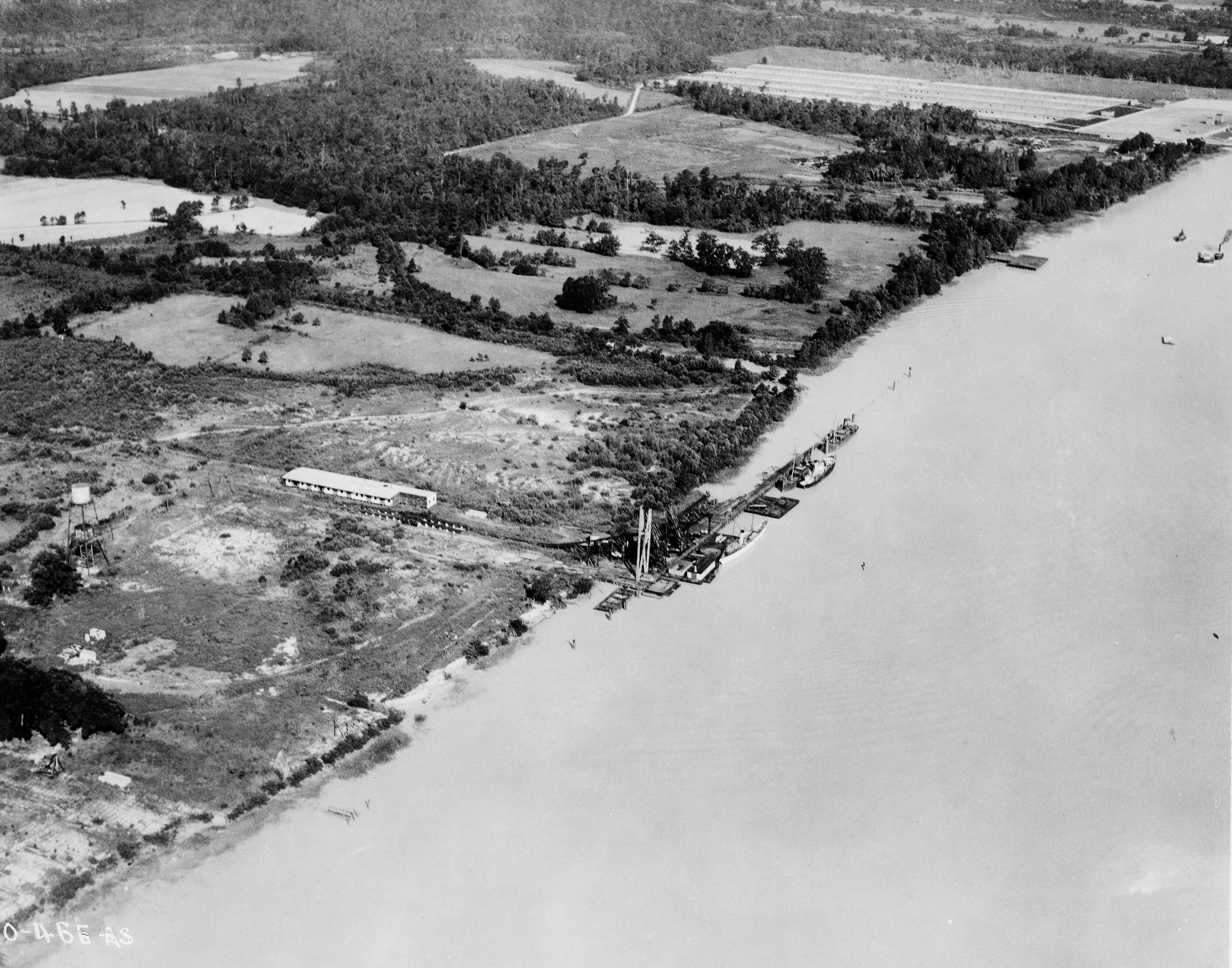

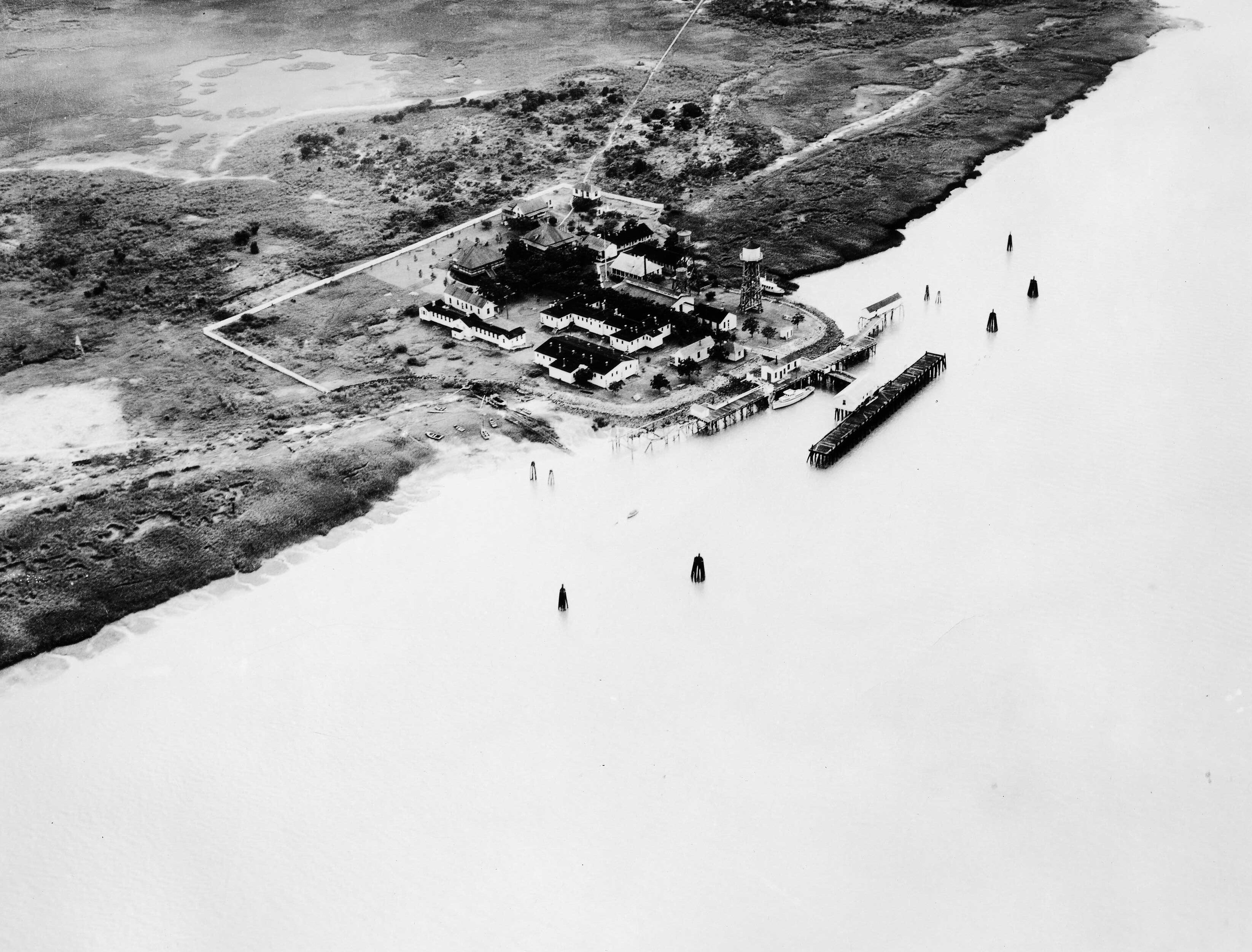

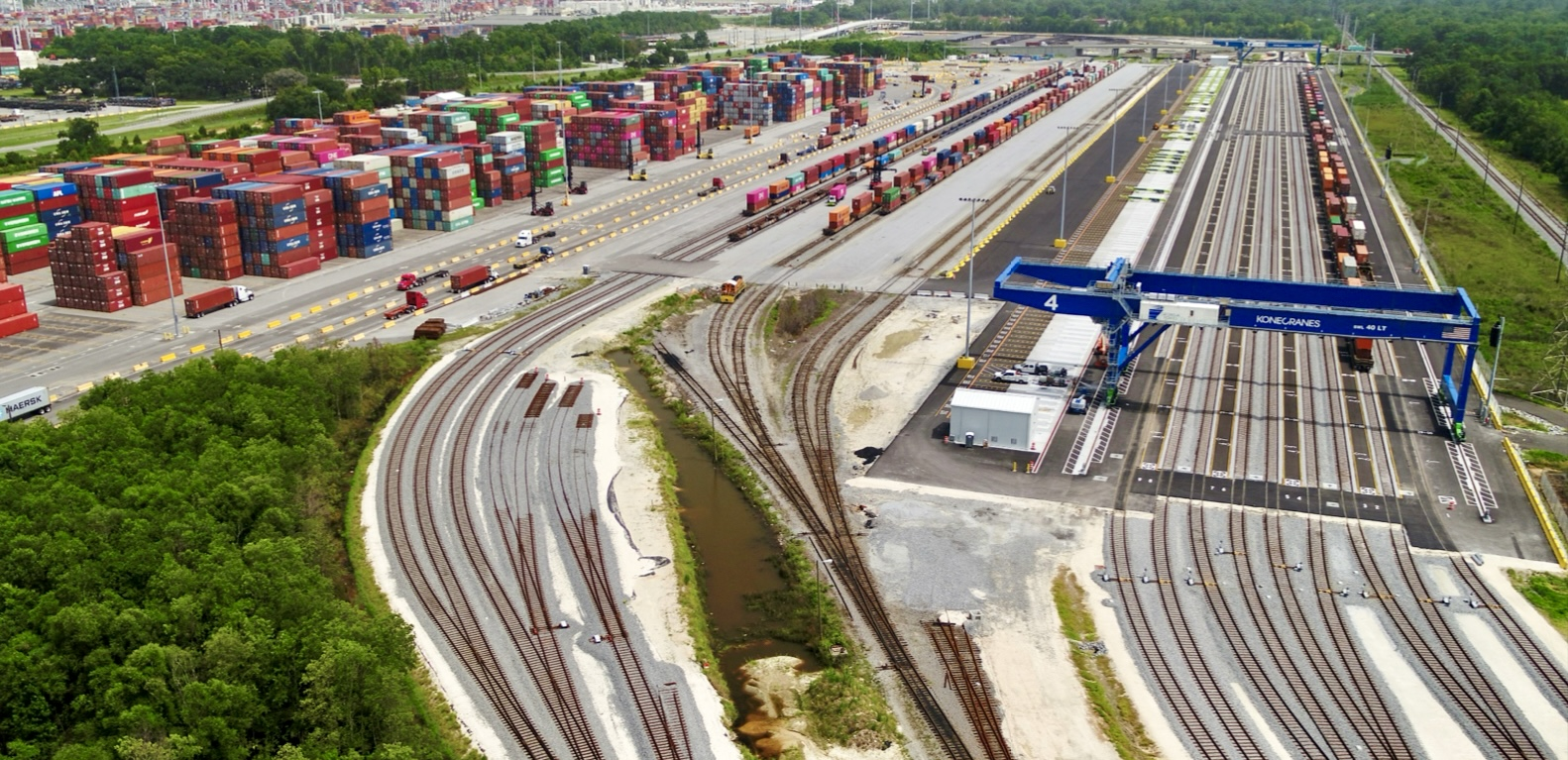
Intermodal terminal at the port

== See also ==
- United States container ports
- Jasper Ocean Terminal
- George Ferguson Armstrong
- Archibald Bulloch Jr.
