= United States container ports =

Cargo transfer facilities

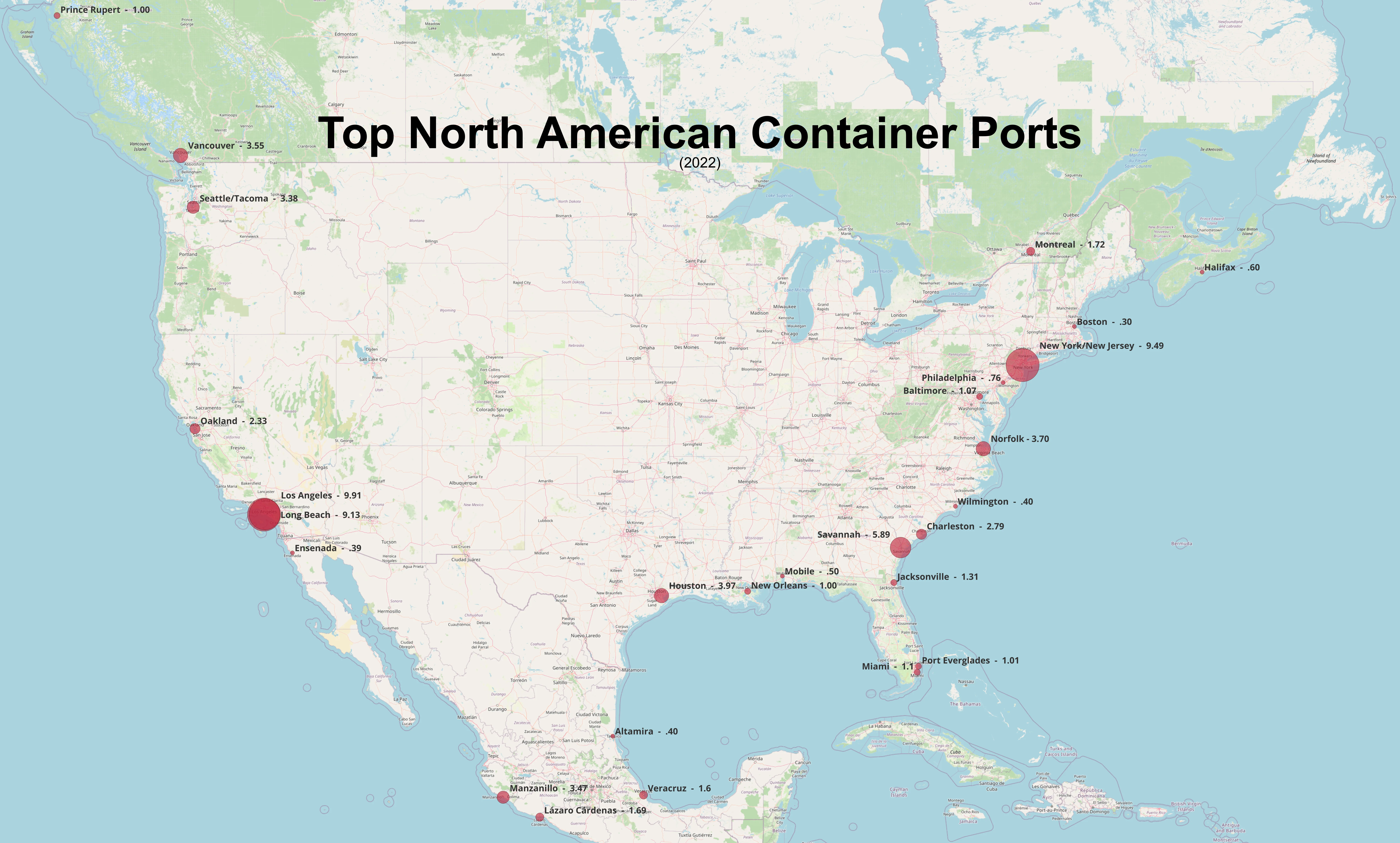
North American container ports

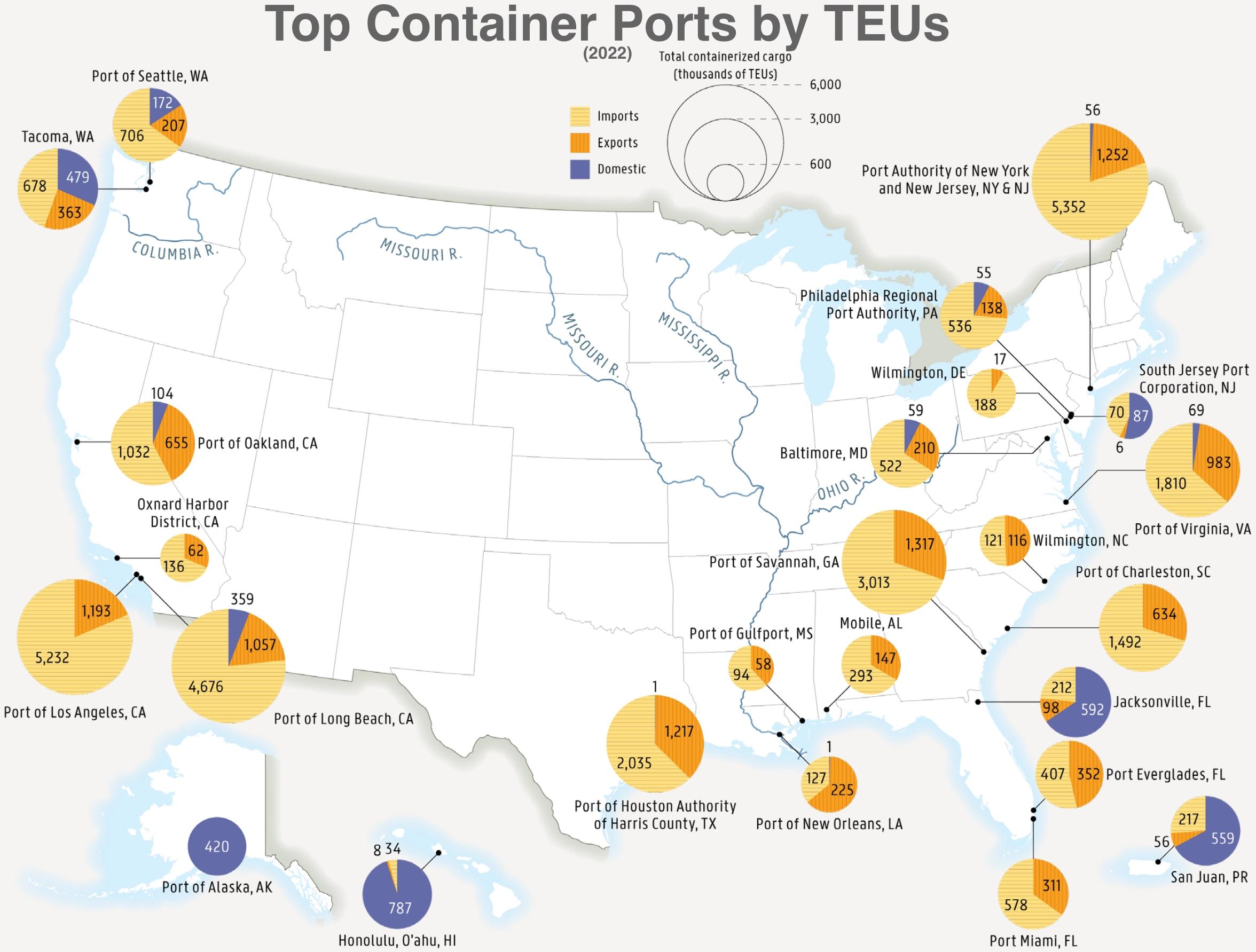
Top container ports by TEUs Imports Exports Domestic

The United States has more than 20 container ports around its coastline.

== West Coast ==
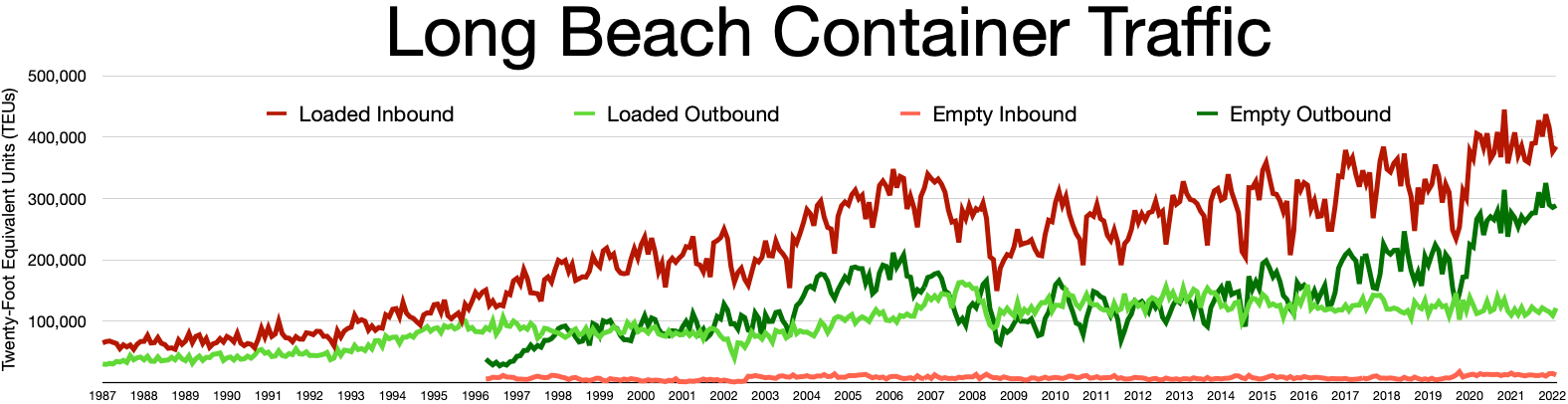
Port of Long Beach traffic Loaded Imports Empty Exports Loaded Exports Empty Imports

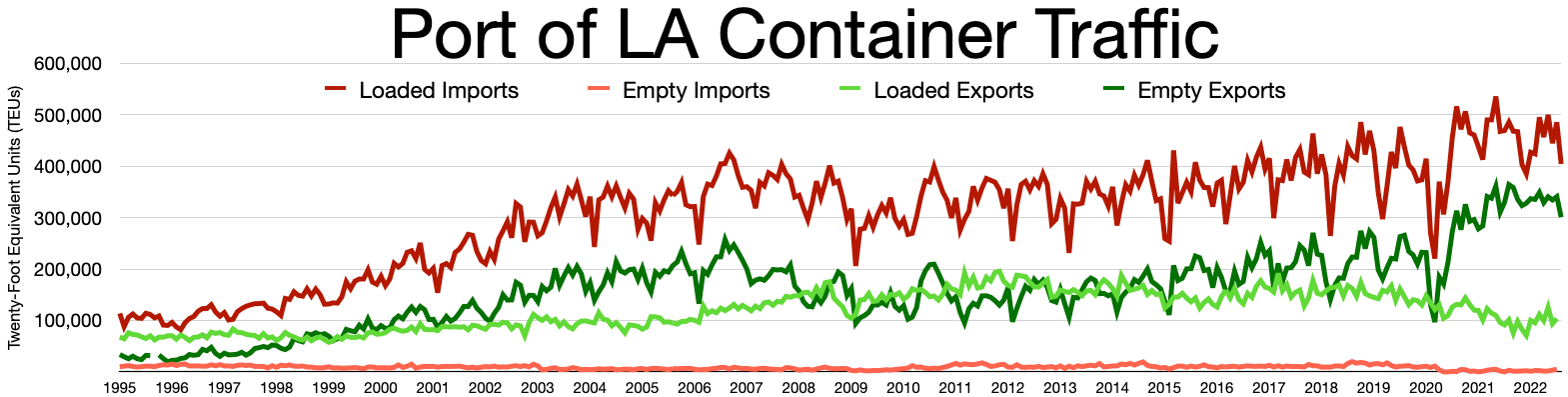
Port of LA traffic Loaded Imports Empty Exports Loaded Exports Empty Imports

Container port draft depths and air drafts
Port	Draft depth	Air draft
Port of Seattle	50 feet (15 m)	Unlimited
Port of Tacoma	Greater than 50 feet (15 m)	Unlimited
Port of Portland	40 feet (12 m)	196 feet (60 m)
Port of Oakland	50 feet (15 m)	220 feet (67 m)
Port of San Francisco	50 feet (15 m)	220 feet (67 m)
Port of Hueneme	40 feet (12 m)	Unlimited
Port of Los Angeles	Greater than 52 feet (16 m)	Unlimited
Port of Long Beach	Greater than 50 feet (15 m)	Unlimited
Port of San Diego	Greater than 35 feet (11 m)	Unlimited

== Gulf Coast ==
Container port draft depths and air drafts
Port	Draft depth	Air draft
Port of Houston	45 feet (14 m)	Unlimited
Port of New Orleans	45 feet (14 m)	170 feet (52 m)
Port of Gulfport	39 feet (12 m)	Unlimited
Port of Mobile	45 feet (14 m)	Unlimited
Port of Tampa	43 feet (13 m)	Unlimited

== East Coast ==
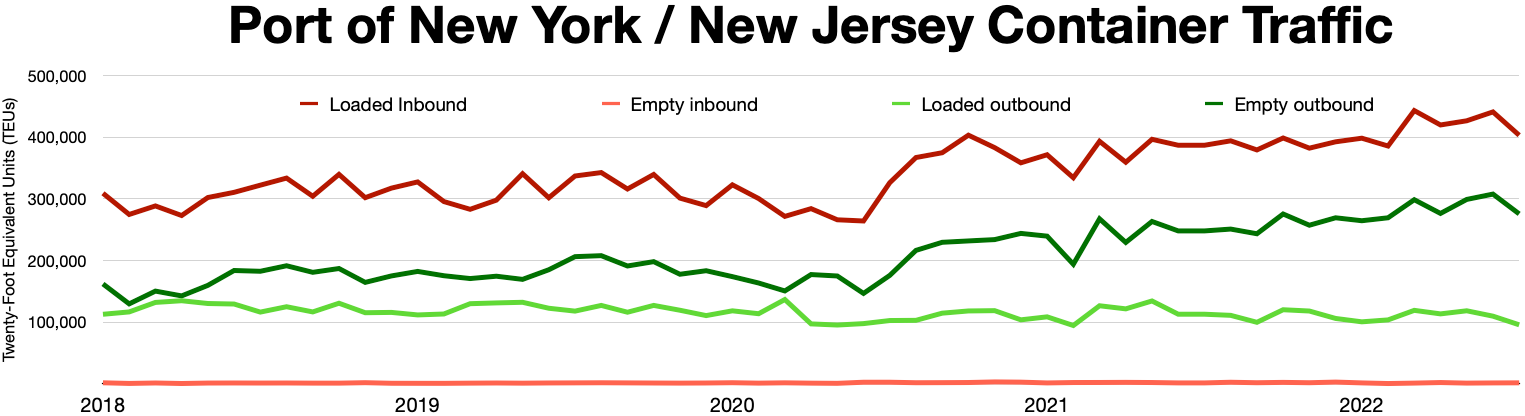
New York - New Jersey container port traffic Loaded Imports Empty Exports Loaded Exports Empty Imports

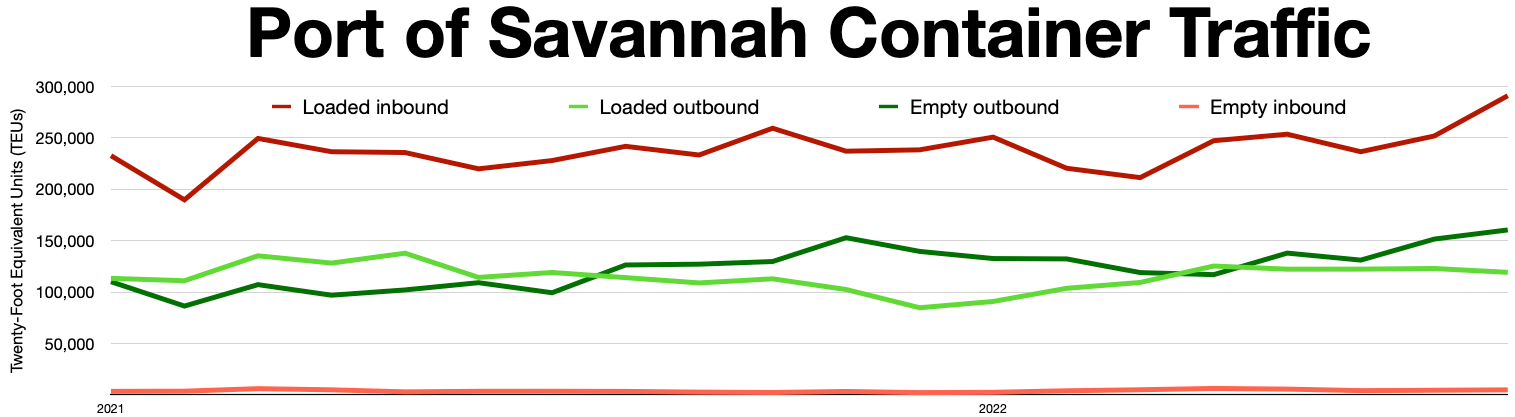
Port of Savannah container traffic Loaded Imports Empty Exports Loaded Exports Empty Imports

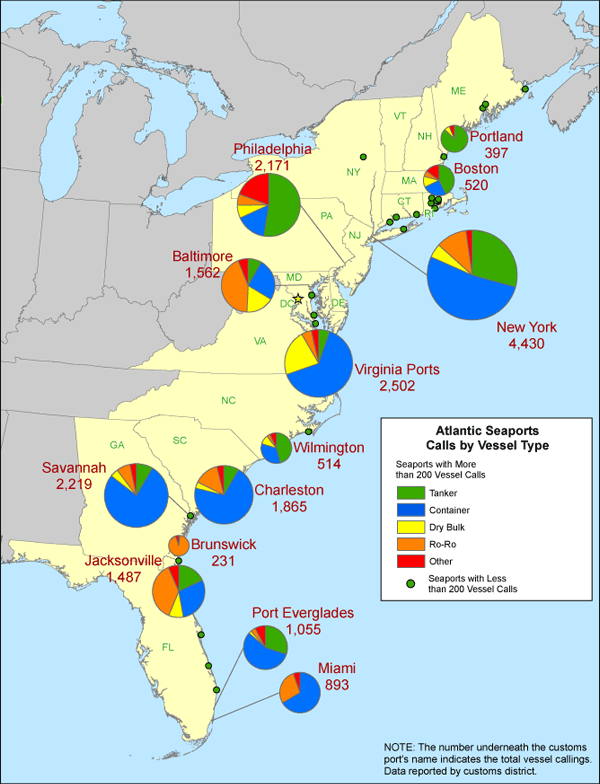
East Coast seaport calls by vessel type

Container port draft depths and air drafts
Port	Draft depth	Air draft
Port of Miami	43 feet (13 m)	Unlimited
Port Everglades	43 feet (13 m)	Unlimited
Port of Palm Beach	36 feet (11 m)	Unlimited
Port of Jacksonville	47 feet (14 m)	175 feet (53 m)
Port of Savannah	47 feet (14 m)	185 feet (56 m)
Port of Charleston	52 feet (16 m)	186 feet (57 m)
Port of Wilmington (North Carolina)	42 feet (13 m)	Unlimited
Port of Virginia:
*Norfolk International Terminals	50 feet (15 m)	Unlimited
*Portsmouth Marine Terminal	50 feet (15 m)	Unlimited
*Newport News Marine Terminal	50 feet (15 m)	Unlimited
*Virginia International Gateway	50 feet (15 m)	Unlimited
Port of Baltimore	50 feet (15 m)	185 feet (56 m)
Port of Wilmington (Delaware)	38 feet (12 m)	188 feet (57 m)
Port of Chester	45 feet (14 m)	188 feet (57 m)
Port of Philadelphia	45 feet (14 m)	188 feet (57 m)
Port of Camden	45 feet (14 m)	150 feet (46 m)
Port of New York and New Jersey:		
*Port Newark–Elizabeth Marine Terminal	50 feet (15 m)	215 feet (66 m)
*Port Jersey	50 feet (15 m)	228 feet (69 m)
*Howland Hook Marine Terminal	50 feet (15 m)	215 feet (66 m)
*Red Hook Container Terminal	50 feet (15 m)	228 feet (69 m)
Port of Boston	47 feet (14 m)	Unlimited
Port of Portland (Maine)	32 feet (9.8 m)	

Dredging of east coast ports are under way because of the New Panama Canal expansion and the expectation of larger container ships.

The Jasper Ocean Terminal is a planned container terminal to be built on the Savannah River downstream of Savannah, GA that is expected to begin operations in the mid 2020s.

== Global supply chain disruption ==
The supply chains that were disrupted during the COVID-19 pandemic faced huge challenges and struggled to recover. Industries around the world shutdown due to the rapid spread of the virus in 2020. There was reduced industrial activity and lower consumer demand. While consumer demand increased quickly when lockdowns were lifted, manufacturers and distributors of goods were stymied by worker shortages and a lack of key components and raw materials. Additional bottlenecks included containers, shipping, trucks, railroads and warehouses. Ports around the world were impacted with ports in the United States in particular experiencing blockages as they were overwhelmed with container ships and their cargo. The ports of Long Beach and Los Angeles together account for approximately 40% of the shipping containers entering the United States. More than three-quarters of the containers leaving Los Angeles were empty in July 2021 whereas about two-thirds of the containers leaving U.S. ports are typically filled with exports. Many of containers were going back empty due to the rush by shippers to bring in imports of back-to-school supplies and fall fashions from Asia. This impacted Midwestern farmers and California Almond Growers who ship to customers overseas. Shipping companies placed a lower priority on products that paid lower shipping rates resulting in various exports being delayed. In October, there were a record number of ships at the docks of these two Los Angeles area ports as well a record number of ships waiting for a slip. In early November, more than 100 ships were anchored in San Pedro Bay. It was unusual for even one vessel to be waiting offshore before the coronavirus pandemic. In late 2021 and the first month of 2022, container ships have remained at American ports unloading goods for seven days on average, 21 percent higher than at the start of the pandemic. The mayhem at ports and shipping yards was a key driver for rising prices together with the market dominance of major companies. In early 2022, politicians and central bankers worked to tame inflation as businesses continued to struggle to manufacture and distribute their products. By July the total value of trade stuck on the water off the east and west coast ports was estimated at roughly $30 billion. Another $1.5 billion in trade was waiting for rail service at the Ports of Long Beach and Los Angeles which was 60% of all containers waiting at these ports. By September 2022, the backlog at U.S. ports decreased partially due to slowing U.S. import volumes amid high inflation and rising interest rates.

== See also ==
- List of ports of the United States ranked by tonnage
- Container on barge on the Mississippi and tributaries
- List of world's busiest container ports
