= Athens Transit =

Bus public transit system in Athens, Georgia

- Old logo used by Athens Transit (until 2018)
- Founded: 1976
- Headquarters: Athens, Georgia, United States
- Service area: Athens-Clarke County
- Service type: Fixed route On-demand Paratransit
- Routes: 18
- Stops: 500
- Hubs: Athens Multi-Modal Transportation Center (primary); Georgia Square Mall; North Ave. Piggly Wiggly
- Fleet: 32 buses 8 vans
- Annual ridership: 1,200,000 (2023)
- Fuel type: Diesel
- Operator: Unified Government of Athens-Clarke County
- Director: Victor Pope
- Website: Official website

Athens-Clarke County Transit (ACC Transit or Athens Transit) is the bus public transit system in Athens, Georgia, United States. The system was started in 1976, and today 18 routes operate throughout the city. The whole system is fare-free. Most bus routes have the buses stop at a given location once per hour during operating hours.

== History ==
Athens Transit and UGA Campus Transit buses were part of an early trial of biodiesel fuel during the 1996 Olympics.

Athens Transit was formerly known as "The Bus" but in 2018 it was changed to its current branding as "Athens-Clarke County Transit" as it was one of the few remaining A-CC services that did not refer to "Athens-Clarke" in its name.

== Routes ==
As of August 2025, ACC Transit operates 18 routes. Most routes are designed as loops, with outbound buses on a given route not returning on the same streets. This can prove confusing, but major streets generally have two routes serving them: one outbound, and one inbound. Most routes terminate at the Athens Multi-Modal Transportation Center, which was built in 2006 on a brownfield near the North Oconee River. The Multi-Modal Center was a winner of the 2007 Innovative Design in Engineering and Architecture award from the American Institute of Steel Construction, and it is designed to accommodate a future "Brain Train" to Atlanta.
