= South Carolina Ports Authority =

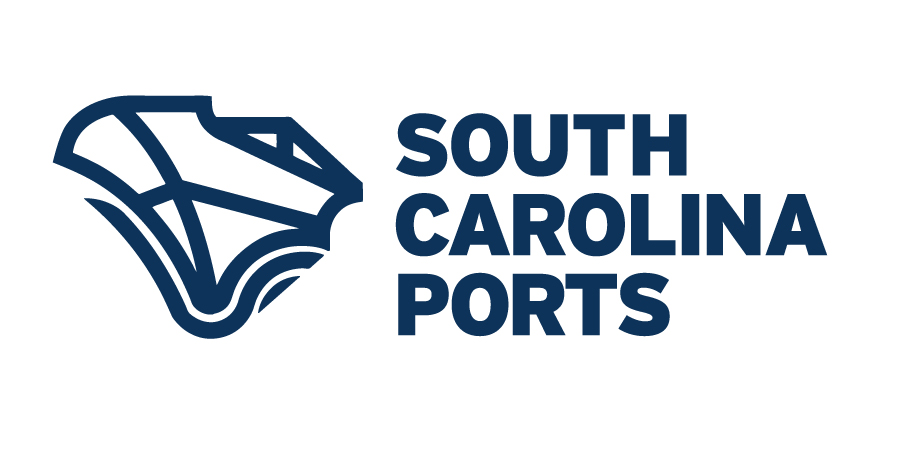
- Abbreviation: SCPA
- Formation: 1942
- Type: Owner/operator
- Headquarters: Mt. Pleasant, South Carolina
- President & CEO: Phillip Padgett (Interim CEO)
- Website: scspa.com

The South Carolina Ports Authority (SCPA) owns and operates public seaport facilities in Charleston, as well as Inland Ports in Greer, South Carolina, and Dillon, South Carolina. Established by the South Carolina General Assembly in 1942, it is authorized and charged with promoting, developing, constructing, equipping, maintaining and operating the harbors and seaports within the State of South Carolina.

An economic development engine for the State, the South Carolina Ports Authority handles international commerce valued at more than $75 billion annually while receiving no direct taxpayer subsidy. According to a 2023 economic impact study conducted by University of South Carolina Darla Moore School of Business research economist and professor Dr. Joseph Von Nessen, port operations facilitate 260,000 jobs across South Carolina (one in every 9 jobs) paying 23% higher than the state's average wage. The study attributes nearly $87 billion in annual statewide economic activity to port operations.

SCPA was created by the South Carolina General Assembly in 1942 by Act No. 626 (Title 54 - Ports and Maritime Matters in South Carolina Code of Laws) as an instrumentality of the State possessing the powers of a body corporate.

== Description of Operations ==
The South Carolina Ports Authority (SCPA) owns public port and transportation facilities in Charleston, North Charleston, Charleston County, Dillon and Greer, South Carolina. The largest facilities are located in Charleston, where the SCPA operates five major ocean terminals capable of handling breakbulk and container shipments in addition to passenger vessels. All of SCPA's container terminal facilities are located at the Port of Charleston, where the primary focus is the movement of containerized shipments to and from the vessels calling the port.

The role of the SCPA is as a terminal operator serving as receiver of export cargo from inland carriers and a receiver and dispatcher of import cargo. The SCPA is an operating port, as distinguished from a landlord port. The majority of the cargo and virtually all of the container cargo passing through the SCPA's facilities is bound for or originates from international destinations. In addition to national economic conditions, major factors affecting the SCPA's cargo volumes include global economic trends, currency exchange rates with overseas trading partners and consumer demand in the Southeastern and Midwestern United States.

== Facilities ==
South Carolina Ports Authority facility locations
1 Port of Charleston
2 Port of Georgetown
3 Inland Port Greer
4 Inland Port Dillon

=== Port of Charleston ===
The SCPA owns and operates six public marine terminals in the Port of Charleston. These facilities handle both containerized and non-containerized cargo, as well as cruise passengers. The sixth facility - the Hugh K. Leatherman Terminal - is a container terminal which opened in March 2021 at the former Charleston Navy Base.

=== Inland Port Greer ===
Opened November 2013, the South Carolina Inland Port in Greer, SC extended the reach of the port more than 200 miles into the state's interior. Connected to the Port of Charleston via overnight rail offered by the Norfolk Southern, Inland Port Greer handles containerized goods to and from the fastest-growing part of the Southeast - the I-85 corridor.

=== Inland Port Dillon ===
Officials broke ground on Inland Port Dillon on March 10, 2017, and officially opened in April 2018. Located within the Carolinas I-95 Mega Site, Inland Port Dillon has close proximity to I-95, a critical transportation artery in the Southeast. The area is central to a significant base of existing Port users that represent base cargo opportunities for the facility. The initial phase is expected to handle at least 45,000 containers annually, offering overnight access to and from the Port of Charleston via an existing CSX mainline.

== Economic impact ==
A 2023 study by Dr. Joseph Von Nessen at the University of South Carolina's Darla Moore School of Business concluded that the SCPA's statewide impacts include:

- $87 billion in annual economic activity
- 260,000 jobs
- $17.6 billion in labor income
- $1.5 billion in tax revenue

== Capital Investment Plan ==
South Carolina Ports Authority invested $1.05 billion in new and existing facilities between Fiscal Years 2016 and 2020, including the recently opened Hugh K. Leatherman, Wando Welch Terminal improvements, a new corporate headquarters, inland ports in Greer and Dillon, and the Ridgeville Industrial Campus. The funding for the capital plan was internally generated based on the SCPA's ability to borrow (in the form of revenue bonds) as well as its operating revenues. Additionally, the State of South Carolina has committed approximately $800 million in funding for port-related infrastructure projects in the works. These projects include a new dual-rail served container staging yard in North Charleston, a port access road tying the Ports Authority's new container terminal to I-26, as well as the state share of construction cost ($300 million) of the Charleston Harbor Deepening Project.

== Governance ==
South Carolina Ports Authority is governed by a nine-member Board of Directors, each appointed by the Governor and confirmed by the Senate, along with two non-voting, ex-officio members - the state Secretary of Commerce and Secretary of Transportation. They serve terms of seven years or until their successors have been appointed and qualified. A Review and Oversight Commission on the South Carolina State Ports Authority (ROCSPA), composed of members of the South Carolina General Assembly, was established in 2009. Despite its status as a public agency dedicated to the economic development of the State of South Carolina, the Ports Authority does not receive direct appropriations from the state for capital or operations expenses. Instead, the Ports Authority operates like a private business, and funds its operations and investment efforts through its own revenue stream and ability to issue bonds.

== Leadership ==
Since its founding in 1942, the South Carolina Ports Authority has only had six leaders.

- Cotesworth P. Means, general manager (1949–1961): Sen. Cotesworth P. Means was the first general manager of the newly created South Carolina State Ports Authority. Means and Columbia attorney Robert Figg, Jr. convinced the SC General Assembly to pass Act No. 626 creating the SC State Ports Authority with the mission to build and develop ports in Charleston, Georgetown, and the Beaufort-Port Royal area.
- Capers G. Barr, general manager (1961–1971): A former Navy captain, Capers G. Barr was appointed general manager of the SCPA on September 26, 1961. During his tenure in the 1960s, Barr led the SCPA through a period of tremendous growth. Between 1960 and 1969, cargo volume increased from 770,000 tons to 2.2 million tons.
- W. Donald Welch, executive director (1971–1996): W. Don Welch succeeded Capers G. Barr in 1971 as the first chief executive of the SCPA with a professional background in transportation. Under his leadership, Welch guided the development of the Wando Terminal (renamed Wando Welch in 2005), from the purchase of land in 1972, to its 1981 opening and 1997 completion. Welch retired in 1996 after a 25 year career at SCPA.
- Bernard S. Groseclose, Jr., president and chief executive officer (1997–2009): Bernie Groseclose joined the authority in 1985, and was promoted to chief executive officer effective January 1, 1997. During his tenure, the Arthur Ravenel Bridge opened, and Charleston Harbor was deepened to 45 feet to accommodate the increasingly larger container ships calling ports worldwide.
- James I. Newsome, III, president and chief executive officer (2009–2022): After a 25+ year career as an ocean carrier executive, Jim Newsome joined the South Carolina Ports Authority as president and CEO on September 1, 2009. Under his leadership, SCPA opened two inland ports, completed a $560 million upgrade to existing terminals and infrastructure, increased volume by almost double, began construction on the post-45 Harbor Deepening Project, and opened Phase 1 of the Hugh K Leatherman Terminal in 2021. Newsome retired June 30, 2022 after 13 years at SCPA.
- Barbara L. Melvin, president and chief executive officer (2022–2025): Barbara Melvin succeeded Jim Newsome as president and CEO on July 1, 2022. She is SCPA's sixth leader, and the first woman to lead a top-10 U.S. operating container port. Melvin joined SCPA in 1998, and has served in several senior leadership positions, the most recently as chief operating officer.
