= UGA Campus Transit =

Transit system near the University of Georgia

Campus Transit
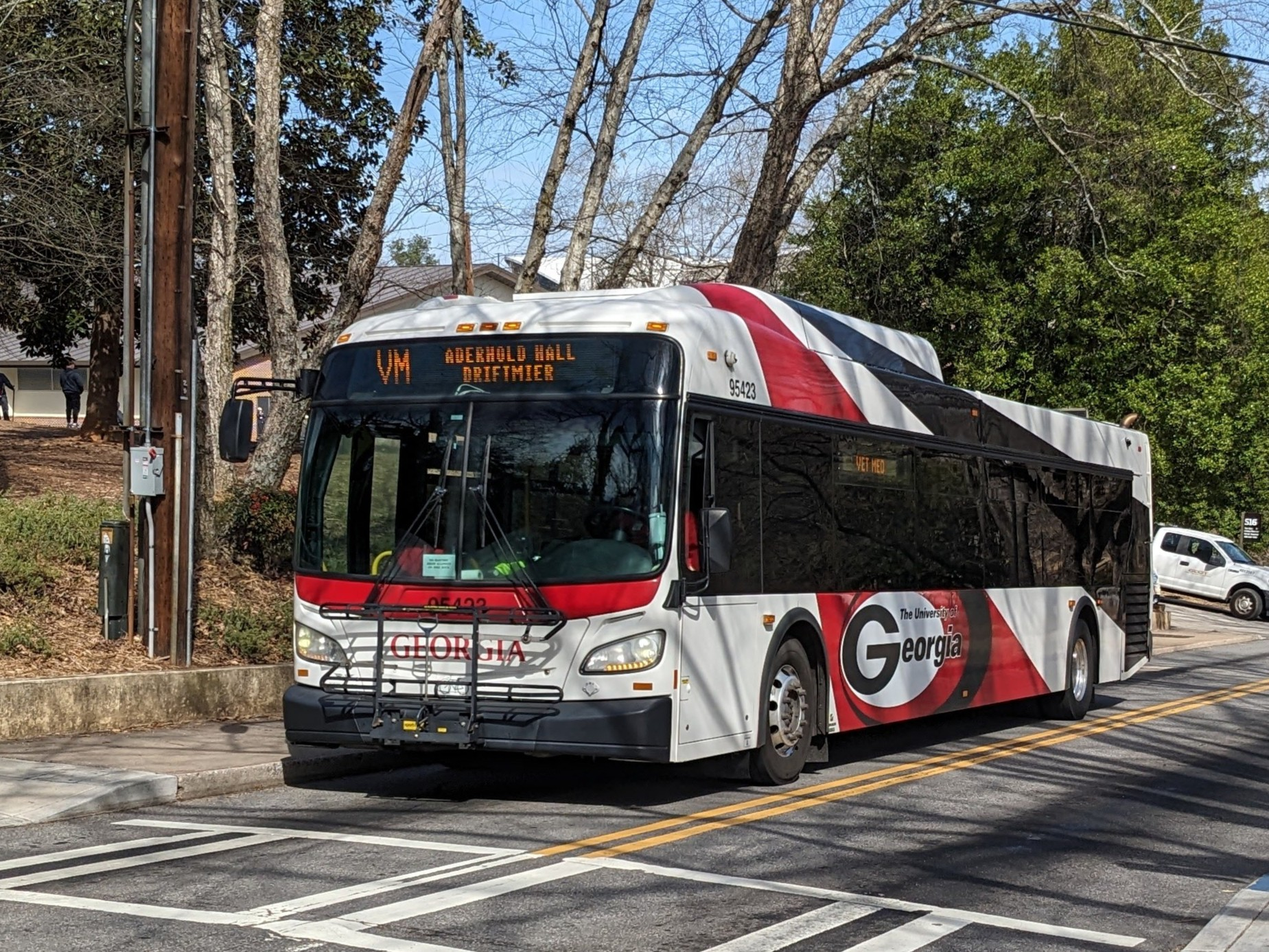
- Route VM bus on D.W. Brooks Drive
- Parent: University of Georgia
- Founded: 1966
- Headquarters: 2505 Riverbend Road, Athens, GA
- Service area: University of Georgia Campus
- Service type: Fixed route On-demand and subscription paratransit Charter
- Routes: 11 weekday 2 night 1 weekend
- Hubs: East Campus Parking Deck/ J.F. Harris Commons/ Performing & Visual Arts Complex; Tate Student Center/ Memorial Hall/ Zell B. Miller Learning Center; Main Library/ Peabody Hall/ Human Resources
- Fleet: Orion, NABI, New Flyer, and Proterra buses Ford Transit vans (on low-demand route) Dodge, Chevrolet & Chrysler paratransit vans
- Annual ridership: 2,979,387
- Fuel type: Diesel, Electric
- Campus Transit Director: Todd Berven
- Website: www.tps.uga.edu

The University of Georgia Campus Transit system operates on the campus and vicinity of the university. The system also runs two shuttles on football home game days. As of 2024, Campus Transit has an annual ridership of 2,979,387, second only to MARTA among transit systems in Georgia.

All fixed routes are fare-free and open to anyone including students, faculty, staff, and visitors. The service is funded primarily by a transportation fee paid by students each semester. Unlike the transit systems found in many college towns, Campus Transit is separate from the Athens Transit system serving Athens-Clarke County. Operations began in September 1966.

== History ==
UGA Campus Transit began in September 1966 with four Army surplus buses. Until 1972, the system relied on a 5¢ fare collected via cigar boxes on the buses to fund operations, reflecting the nascent stage of campus mobility needs amid post-World War II enrollment growth.

As UGA's student population nearly doubled from 11,879 in fall 1966 to 21,873 in fall 1970, driven by broader access to higher education and returning veterans, the transit system expanded to accommodate rising demand.[10] By the early 1970s, it had grown to multiple routes covering key campus areas, including north-south loops, east-west connectors, and services to married student housing along Milledge Avenue, with bus acquisitions ramping up—such as five General Motors coaches in 1970 alone—to support this development. Further integration with local transit occurred in 1978 when public transportation resumed in Athens after a hiatus, granting UGA students fare-free access to Athens Transit routes funded through university fees, which enhanced connections beyond campus boundaries.

In the 1990s and early 2000s, UGA Campus Transit underwent significant expansion to address the university's rapidly growing enrollment, which expanded from around 30,000 students in 1990 to over 35,000 by 2005. By the mid-2000s, the system had expanded to 11 weekday routes, incorporating service to newly developed areas like East Campus and the Riverbend area, thereby enhancing accessibility for a larger commuter population.

Technological integrations marked a pivotal modernization phase in the 2010s, with the adoption of GPS tracking systems enabling real-time route monitoring for passengers. In 2012, UGA launched the Transit app, developed in partnership with Passio Technologies, which provided live bus locations, arrival predictions, and route planning features to improve user experience and operational efficiency. These advancements were complemented by the integration of automated vehicle location (AVL) data into the university's broader smart campus initiatives, reducing wait times and optimizing fleet dispatching.

Collaborations with Athens-Clarke County Transit began in the early 2000s, fostering inter-campus connectivity through shared routes and transfer points that linked UGA's North and South campuses with regional services. This partnership, formalized under a 2003 intergovernmental agreement, allowed seamless travel for students and staff between university facilities and downtown Athens, alleviating parking pressures and promoting multimodal transport. In response to the enrollment boom exceeding 38,000 students by the mid-2010s, the system introduced extended night services in 2015, operating until 3:00 a.m. on select routes to accommodate late-night study and social activities.

Beginning in 2020, UGA Campus Transit faced challenges from driver shortages exacerbated by the COVID-19 pandemic and broader labor market shifts, leading to temporary route suspensions and reduced frequencies in 2021-2022. Efforts to mitigate these issues included recruitment incentives and cross-training programs, restoring near-full operations by 2023 while maintaining service reliability above 95% on core routes. In the fall of 2020, the routes were shortened to make stops more frequent throughout campus. In the fall of 2025, the routes were once again changed to reflect changing mobility patterns on campus. Further changes were made to a few routes in June 2026, and some new stops, mostly on-demand, were added to some routes. The Weekender East route was launched as part of a pilot program in August 2026.

== Routes ==
=== Weekday routes ===
Route name	Identifier	Description
Central East	A	This route carries riders to and from the Intramural Fields Deck and east campus to Ag Hill, Tate Center/Memorial Hall area, and the Terry College of Business Learning Community.
Main Campus	B	This route carries riders to and from the central points of campus with stops at the major hubs of the Main Library, the Tate Student Center/Memorial Hall area, north campus, east campus, and south campus.
Campus Housing	C	This route carries riders to and from the University Village area, Driftmier Engineering Center, the Student Learning Center, south campus, and east campus.
North-South	D	This route carries riders to and from central points of campus with stops at the major hubs of the Athens Transit multimodal center in downtown Athens, north campus, the Tate Center/Memorial Hall area, south campus, and the main off-campus park and ride.
East-West	E	This route carries riders across campus with stops at several major hubs in West, South, and East Campus.
Health Science	H	This route carries riders from main campus to the Health Sciences Campus.
Chicopee	K	This route connects the Tate Center/Psychology-Journalism area to the School of Social Work and Chicopee Complex.
East Side Limited	L	This route carries riders to and from the main off-campus park and ride and the vet med center and park and ride to major hubs on campus. This route services east campus, the Tate Center/Memorial Hall area, Ag Hill, and the Intramural Fields.
Milledge	M	This route carries riders from the Main Library and Tate Center/Memorial Hall area in north campus to Five Points in south campus and points along Milledge Avenue.
Riverbend	R	The route services Plant Sciences bus stop for riders needing to get to the UGArden off of Milledge Avenue.
Vet Med	V	This route services east campus and carries riders to the Veterinary Teaching Hospital off of College Station Road, as well as the Kroger shopping center of Barnett Shoals Road.
West Campus	W	This route carries riders to and from the first-year high-rises and low-rises, the Terry College of Business Learning Community, north campus, and the Tate Center/Memorial Hall area.

=== Night and weekend service ===
Route name	Identifier	Description
Campus Housing Night	CN	This route carries riders to and from all major hubs on main campus. This route services north campus, first year high-rises, south campus, east campus, and the University Village area, as well as Downtown Athens.
Milledge Night	MN	This route carries riders from main campus to points on Milledge Avenue and the Health Sciences Campus. This also includes the Tate Student Center and Downtown Athens.
North-South Night	DN	This route serves the same stops as the North South day route, but also goes to the Veterinary Teaching Hospital off of College Station Road, taking over the Vet Med route.
Weekender	WN/WS	This route carries riders to and from all major hubs on main campus as well as servicing the Health Sciences Campus. This route services north campus, first year high-rises, south campus, east campus, and the University Village area, as well as Downtown Athens and the Health Sciences Campus via Prince Avenue.
Weekender East	WE	This route carries riders to and from the Riverbend areas, University Village, Vet Med, and Kroger shopping center to the East Campus/Joe Frank Harris Commons area.

=== Intersession service ===
Operates on days when the university is open but classes are not in session. Most weekday routes are run but with only one or two vehicles serving each one.

=== Charters and special service ===
In addition to regular service, UGA Campus Transit provides shuttles to football games, graduation ceremonies, and other special events on campus. Other UGA departments charter UGA buses for their special events.

== Fleet ==
UGA Campus Transit currently operates 11 older diesel buses manufactured by Orion and 20 New Flyer diesel buses. UGA previously operated buses manufactured by North American Bus Industries (NABI) and Rapid Transit Series (RTS) buses made by General Motors. In April 2019, UGA entered into a contract to purchase up to 20 new Proterra electric buses. The 20 buses were put into service on campus in February 2020. In December 2019, as the University of Georgia was awarded $7.46 million under the Federal Transit Administration's Grants for Buses and Bus Facilities Program, it was announced that 13 additional electric buses would be added to the fleet, which will brought the total number of electric buses on campus to 33. The electric buses accounted for a third of the total fleet in 2021, when UGA began phasing out older diesel buses. In September 2023, the agency received a $7.2 million federal grant to purchase eight additional electric buses. After Proterra's bankruptcy in 2023, UGA Campus Transit was unable to obtain replacement parts and fix software issues with electric buses, forcing them to indefinitely decommission the Proterras that had issues and rely more heavily on their older diesel fleet. To compensate for the loss of electric buses, a purchase of ten new diesel buses was made in the spring of 2025. The eight new electric New Flyers arrived in the summer of 2025, and were put into service for the fall semester. Some of the Proterras were also repaired and restored to service starting around the same time and continuing into 2026. The agency also rented a few buses, which are mostly used for charters and special events, starting in the spring of 2026 as placeholders until they can purchase more new buses. In addition to buses, UGA Campus Transit also has a small number of vans and microbuses for dispatch use and low demand service.
