= Port Bainbridge =

Atlantic Seaport in southeast Georgia, United States

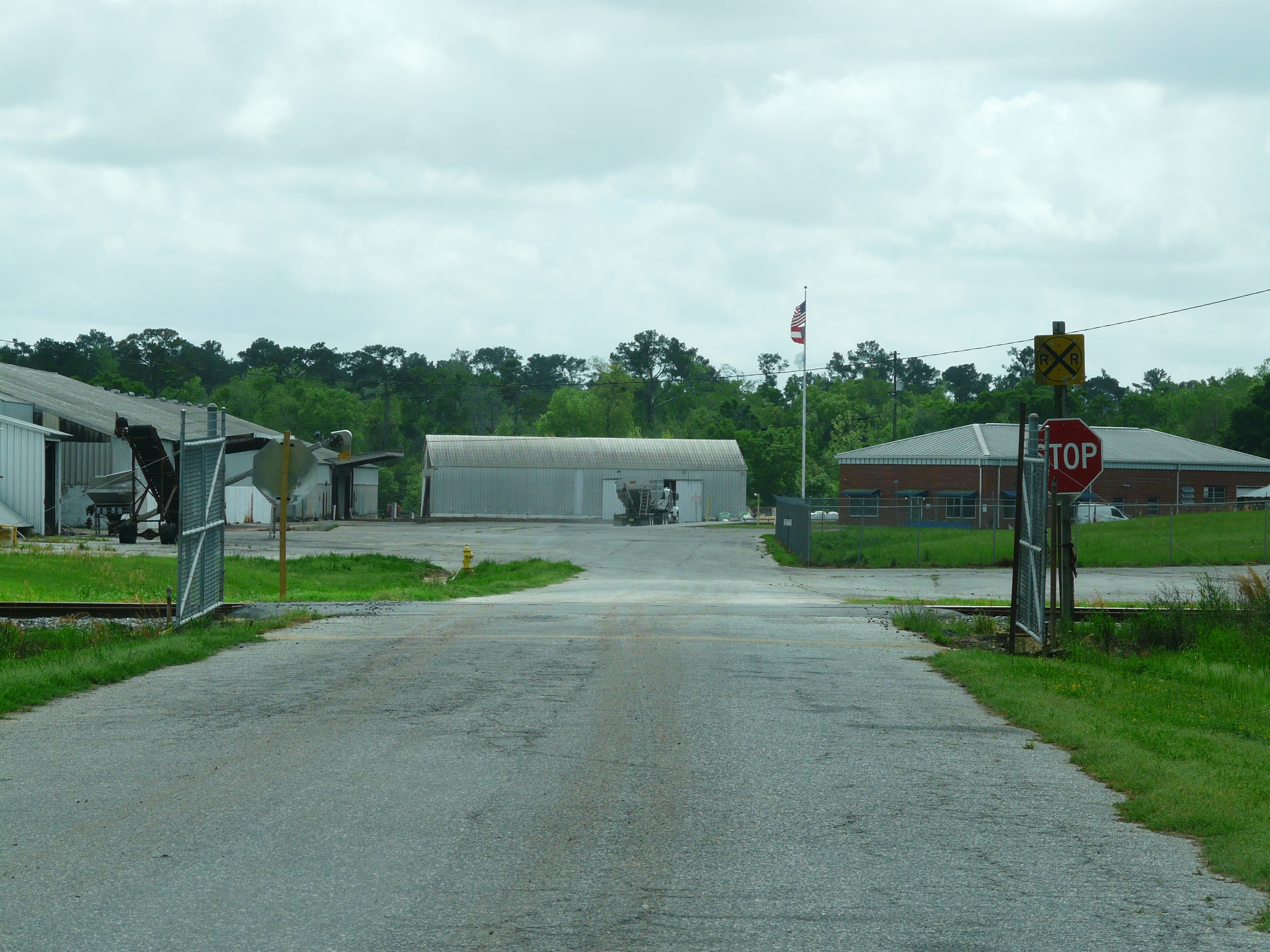
- Entrance to Port Bainbridge
- Interactive map of Port Bainbridge

Location
- Country: United States of America
- Location: Bainbridge, Georgia, U.S.A.
- Coordinates: 30.898°N 84.607°W

Details
- Owned by: Georgia Ports Authority
- Type of harbour: River natural

Statistics
- Website https://gaports.com/facilities/bainbridge/

Port Bainbridge is an inland seaport operated by the Georgia Ports Authority and is located in Bainbridge, Georgia. It handles sea trade and cargo shipments to and from the Gulf of Mexico via Florida's Apalachicola River. The terminal facilities cover 107 acres (0.43 km^{2}) and include 9,292 square meters of warehouse space.
