= Georgia Ports Authority =

Operator of port facilities in the U.S. state of Georgia

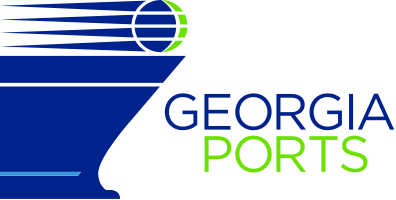
- Abbreviation: GPA
- Type: Agency
- Headquarters: Savannah, Georgia, United States
- Location(s): Savannah, Georgia; Garden City, Georgia; Brunswick, Georgia; Bainbridge, Georgia; Columbus, Georgia; Chatsworth, Georgia
- President and CEO: Griff Lynch
- Website: gaports.com

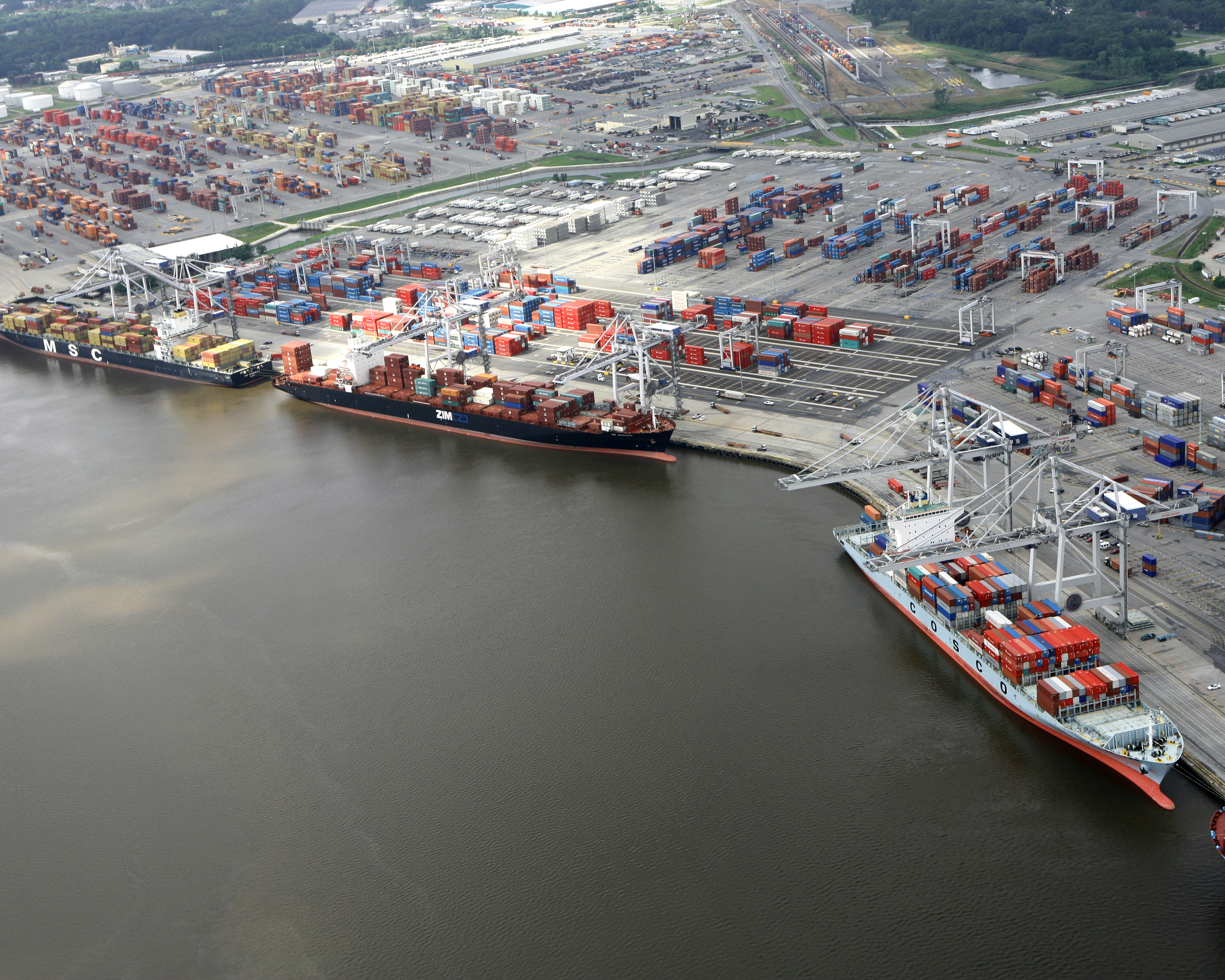
The Garden City Terminal

The Georgia Ports Authority (GPA) is the port authority for the State of Georgia. It was founded by an act of the Georgia General Assembly in 1945 and chaired by Blake R. Van Leer. The GPA operates all seven of Georgia's rail and sea port facilities.

Georgia's primary deepwater ports are located in Savannah and Brunswick, supplemented by three inland container trans-load facilities.

== Facilities ==
Georgia Ports Authority facility locations
1 Port of Savannah
2 Port of Brunswick
3 Appalachian Regional Port
4 Bainbridge
5 Northeast Georgia Inland Port

=== Port of Savannah ===
The Port of Savannah comprises two major facilities:

- Garden City Terminal: Owned and operated by the GPA, the Garden City Terminal is a secured, dedicated container terminal, the largest single-operator container terminal in North America. The 1,345-acre (5 km^{2}) facility features 9,693 feet (2,955 m) of continuous berthing and more than 1.1 million square feet (104,000 m^{2}) of covered storage. The terminal is equipped with thirty-six high-speed container cranes (30 super post-Panamax and 6 post-Panamax), as well as an extensive inventory of yard handling equipment.
- Ocean Terminal: Also owned and operated by the GPA, the Ocean Terminal is a secured, dedicated breakbulk cargo facility specializing in the rapid and efficient handling of a vast array of forest and solid wood products, steel, RoRo (Roll-on / Roll-off), project shipments and heavy-lift cargoes. The 200.8-acre (0.8 km^{2}) facility features 3,599 feet (1,099 m) of deepwater berthing, approximately 1.425 million square feet (133,000 m^{2}) of covered storage and 99 acres (401,000 m^{2}) of open, versatile storage.

=== Port of Brunswick ===
The Port of Brunswick includes three GPA-owned deepwater terminals, two of which are directly operated by the GPA.

- Colonel's Island Terminal: Owned and operated by the GPA, the facility has three berths and three on-terminal auto processors. The 1,700-acre (7 km^{2})-plus facility features 3,355 feet (1,023 m) of continuous berthing and circa 637-acre (3 km^{2}) of paved open storage. The facility also handles break-bulk and project cargo.
- Mayor's Point Terminal specializes in break-bulk and project cargo, in particular the handling forest products. The 22-acre (0.1 km^{2}) facility features 1,200 feet (366 m) of deepwater berthing, approximately 355,000 square feet (33,000 m^{2}) of covered storage and 7.9 acres (32,100 m^{2}) of open, versatile storage.
- East River Terminal and Lanier Dock, operated by Logistec U.S.A., specializes in the handling of break-bulk and bulk commodities. The 66-acre (0.3 km^{2}) facility features 1,600 feet (488 m) of deepwater berthing, approximately 688,000 square feet (64,000 m^{2}) of covered storage and 15 acres (61,000 m^{2}) of open, versatile storage.

=== Appalachian Regional Port ===
Georgia Ports Authority opened the Appalachian Regional Port, a container truck-to-rail transload facility in Murray County, Georgia, in August 2018. The inland port serves additional markets in Alabama and Tennessee and is connected to the Port of Savannah by a 388-mile CSX-operated railroad route.

=== Bainbridge Inland Port ===
Owned and operated by the Georgia Ports Authority, Bainbridge is located on the Apalachicola-Chattahoochee-Flint Waterway. The facility is equipped to handle a variety of bulk cargo via barge traffic, including nitrogen solution, gypsum, ammonium sulfate, urea, cottonseed and cypress bark mulch.

=== Northeast Georgia Inland Port ===
The 104-acre Northeast Georgia Inland Port will open in 2021, providing a direct link to the Port of Savannah via Norfolk Southern. The rail terminal will open with 9,000 feet of working track.

== Economic impact ==
According to a report from the University of Georgia's Terry College of Business, Georgia's ports supported 439,220 full- and part-time jobs throughout Georgia as of 2017, or about 9 percent of total state employment, with personal income of about $25 billion. According to the report, port activity accounted for about $106 billion in statewide sales. Tax revenue stemming from port trade totaled $5.9 billion in federal taxes, $1.4 billion in state taxes, and $1.5 billion in local taxes.

== Savannah Harbor Expansion Project ==
The Savannah Harbor Expansion Project is an in-progress dredging program to deepen the harbor from 42 feet to 47 feet. The depth will allow large ships that are coming through the Panama Canal to call on the Port of Savannah. While some of these Neo-Panamax ships already call Savannah, they are not loaded to capacity. As of February 2018, the project, which began in 2015, was about halfway completed. The remaining work is expected to be finished by 2021, and will allow loaded ships to transport about 3,600 additional cargo containers through the harbor on each passage.

The project is estimated to cost a total of about $973 million, of which 75% is provided by the federal government, with the remainder from the state of Georgia.

In September 2018, the Savannah Morning News reported that officials thought the Talmadge Bridge may need to be replaced if the port was to service Neo-Panamax vessels.
