= Sea Island, Georgia =

Sea Island
- Interactive map of Sea Island
- Location within Georgia Location within the United States
- Coordinates: 31°12′6.22″N 81°19′54.1″W
- Country: United States
- State: Georgia
- County: Glynn
- Elevation: 9.8 ft (3 m)

Population (2010)
  - Total: 298
  - Urban density: 54/sq mi (21/km^{2})
- Time zone: UTC-5 (Eastern (EST))
  - Summer (DST): UTC-4 (EDT)
- ZIP code: 31561
- Area code: 912
- Website: seaisland.com

Sea Island is a privately owned, seaside resort island in Glynn County, Georgia, part of the Golden Isles of Georgia, which include St. Simons Island, Jekyll Island, Little St. Simons Island, and the mainland city of Brunswick. Since 2016, Sea Island has been owned by the Broadmoor-Sea Island Company, a subsidiary of the Anschutz Corporation. The island is located along the Atlantic Coast just east of St. Simons Island. It lies about 60 miles (97 km) north of Jacksonville, Florida, and about 60 miles (97 km) south of Savannah, Georgia, and is reachable via a causeway from St. Simons Island. The Anschutz family of Denver, Colorado, owns two resorts with limited public access and maintains a gated community for around 500 single-family residences.

The resorts, Sea Island Beach Club and The Cloister, are located a short distance from one another, connected by a roundabout in the middle of Sea Island Drive, the island's main connecting road. The oceanfront Beach Club contains restaurants, a game room, a bowling alley, an ice cream shop, a bar, and three pools. Sea Island's main hotel, The Cloister, is located on its southwestern side along the Black Banks River. It includes restaurants, 200 rooms, a spa, tennis and squash courts, an exercise facility, and is home to the only Forbes Five Star restaurant in the state of Georgia, The Georgian Rooms. It is the only resort in the world to have received four Forbes Five-Star awards for fifteen consecutive years.

Georgia's Sea Island is part of a long chain of barrier islands, also known as the "Sea Islands", located along the coasts of South Carolina, Georgia and northern Florida between the Santee and St. Johns rivers.

== History ==
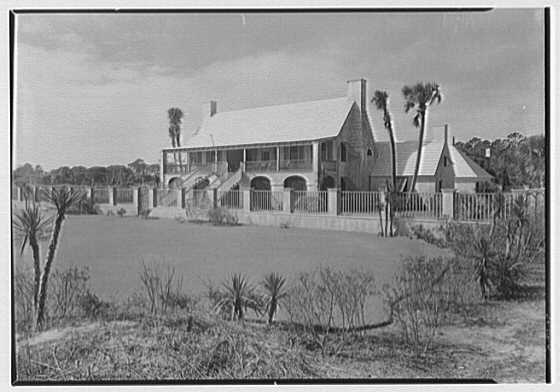
May Patterson Goodrum retired to this property, South Wind, on Sea Island in 1958

Like many of the easternmost barrier islands of Georgia, Sea Island was formed about 5,000 years ago, after the last major ice age. Unlike the much older, Pleistocene-age islands just to its west, there is little information about early human activity on the island. Most of its recorded history dates from the beginning of the 20th century.

Its original English name was Fifth Creek Island. Its first known white settler was Captain James Mackay, who served under General Oglethorpe at Fort Frederica. Subsequent holders included a series of St. Simons Island plantation owners, who used the land primarily for grazing. In 1926, automobile magnate Howard Coffin added it to his other land purchases in coastal Georgia. Two years later, on the advice of friends who foresaw the potential in oceanfront properties, he opened the Cloister Hotel that was nicknamed the "Little Friendly Hotel" and turned over its management to his cousin, Alfred W. Jones. Upon Howard Coffin's death in 1937, A. W. Jones inherited the property, along with other tracts of nearby coastal land owned by the Sea Island Company.

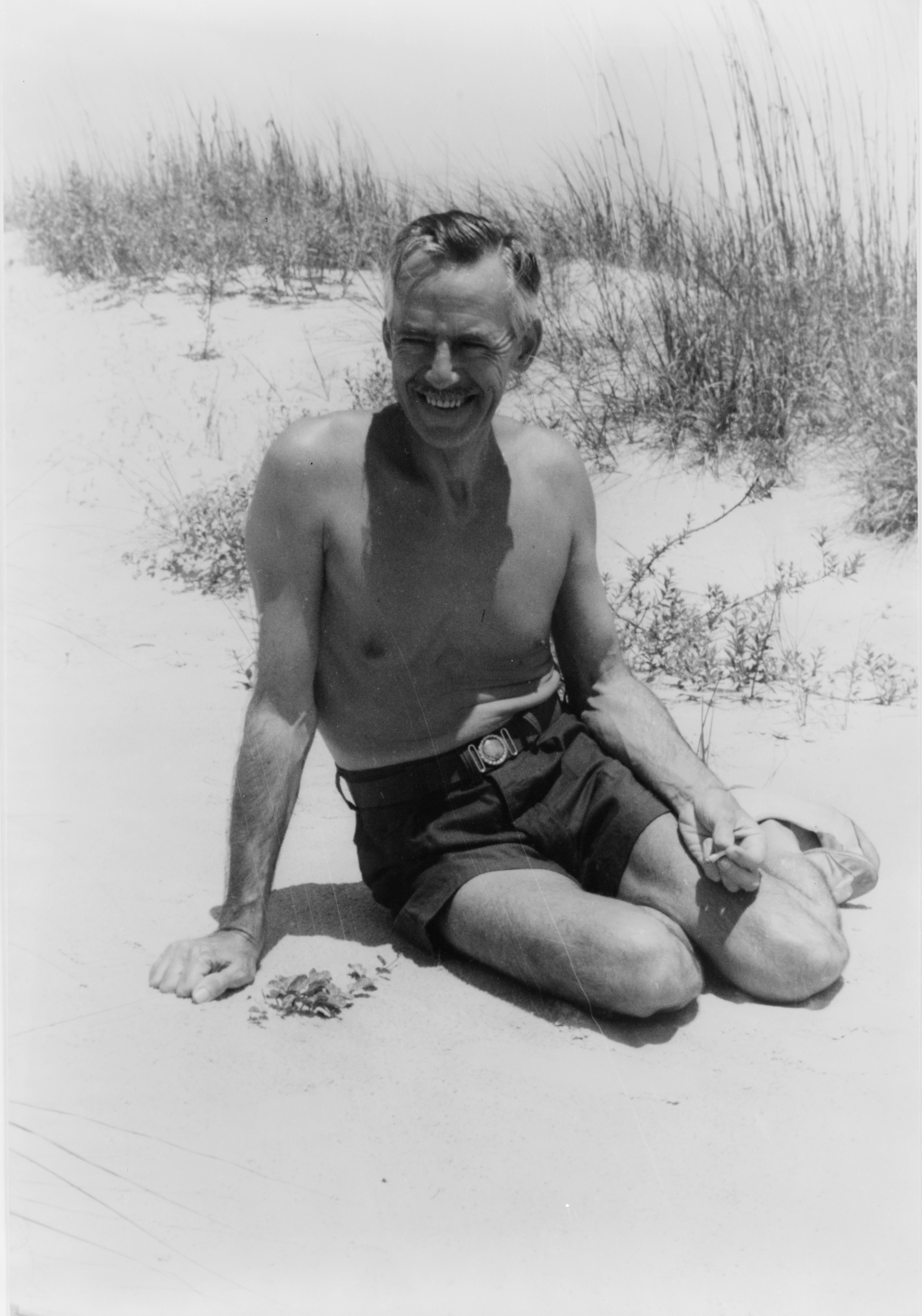
Eugene O'Neill on Sea Island in May 1936. Credit: Carl Van Vechten

From its beginnings, the Cloister was a success, attracting a variety of "Roaring Twenties" luminaries. When President Calvin Coolidge decided to spend his Christmas holidays on Sea Island in 1928, the new hotel gained national attention. Promoted as a quiet, worry-free escape, as opposed to some of the high-energy resorts in Florida, the Cloister appealed to businessmen, politicians, and celebrities, including New York Mayor Jimmy Walker, Edsel Ford, John D. Rockefeller Jr., Eddie Rickenbacker, and many others. In addition to the hotel, Mr. Coffin also dreamed of creating a residential community on the island and encouraged his guests to consider building "cottages" nearby. To that end, he brought in electricity, water and telephone service, and improved causeway access to both St. Simons and Sea Islands. Among those building homes was Eugene O'Neill, who wrote the play Ah, Wilderness! while there.

Although growth slowed during the Great Depression, the still modest resort was able to make it through the financial crisis and World War II. In the postwar years, the Cloister and its surrounding community grew slowly, with the hotel welcoming a steady stream of distinguished guests, including U.S. presidents Hoover, Eisenhower, Ford and Carter. In 1949, Sarah Churchill married photographer Anthony Beauchamp on the island. Among the thousands of honeymooners to visit were George and Barbara Bush. The island's residential community also grew in numbers and in stature, with some lot prices pushing into the millions of dollars by the end of the 20th century.

=== 21st century ===
In 2003, The Lodge was built on St. Simons Island with the help of Bill Jones. The Lodge became a hub for golfers and yet another accommodation under the Sea Island umbrella. By 2003, A. W. "Bill" Jones III decided it was time for a complete reconstruction of the Cloister. The historic original building lacked a proper foundation and did not meet modern building codes, so it was completely demolished and replaced, over a three-year period, with a new, luxurious, much larger structure inspired by the original. Upgrades were also made to the resort's beach club and spa.

Just two years after its grand re-opening, the financial panic of 2008 and the subsequent Great Recession hit the Sea Island Company from several directions. Expected property sales in a new, upscale development did not occur. Resort visitation declined. New home purchases in the surrounding community stalled. Revenue from the Cloister dropped by 31% from 2007 to 2009. As a result, and despite winning 5-star travel guide awards the company defaulted on its loans which were later found to have been ill-advised from the start and about 25% of its workforce was laid off. Although two major creditors, Synovus and Bank of America agreed to a restructured loan package in 2009, Sea Island Company was unable to sell off enough of its land holdings, and again defaulted in 2010. Later that year, the company filed Chapter 11 Bankruptcy, and was acquired by a consortium of investors who formed Sea Island Acquisitions, LLC, to manage the property and turn its business around.

In April 2016, Sea Island Acquisitions completed a $40 million expansion that added a new "Garden Wing" to the Cloister with 63 rooms. In June 2016, the Anschutz family of Denver, Colorado, headed by Philip Anschutz, bought out the other three investors to become the sole owner of Sea Island Company.

== Commemorative live oaks ==
While visiting Sea Island in 1928, President Calvin Coolidge planted a live oak to commemorate the occasion. The planting became a tradition observed by a succession of distinguished guests including presidents and heads of state. In addition to President Coolidge, those who personally planted trees included Presidents Gerald Ford and Jimmy Carter, Queen Juliana of the Netherlands, President George H. W. Bush, Prime Ministers Margaret Thatcher and Tony Blair, and President Bill Clinton. During the G8 conference in 2004, President George W. Bush planted a tree.

Only one of the commemorative trees is not a live oak. In 1931, Howard Coffin planted an English oak acorn from General Oglethorpe's estate in England, to honor the founder of the Georgia colony.

== 2004 G8 summit ==
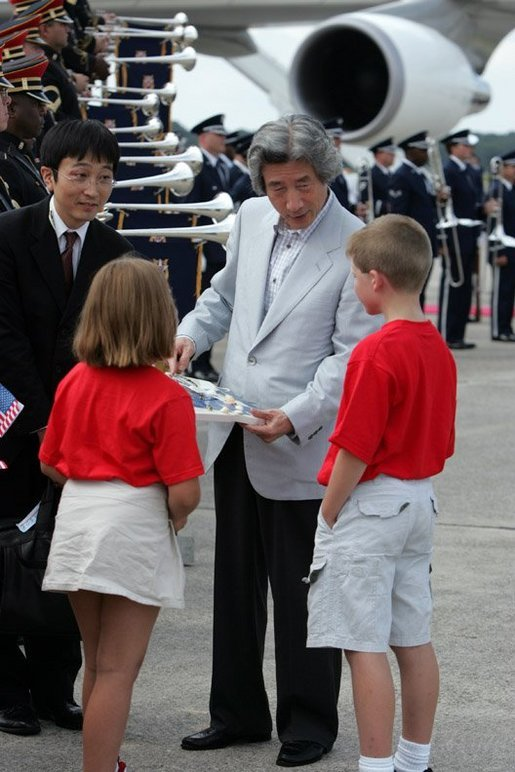
Junichiro Koizumi meets children at the airport, shortly before the 2004 G8 summit.

From June 8–10, 2004, President George W. Bush chose to host a summit of the Group of Eight leaders at Sea Island. Present at the summit were Prime Minister Paul Martin of Canada, President Jacques Chirac of France, Chancellor Gerhard Schroeder of Germany, Prime Minister Silvio Berlusconi of Italy, Prime Minister Junichirō Koizumi of Japan, President Vladimir Putin of Russia, and Prime Minister Tony Blair of the United Kingdom. Also in attendance were European Union Commission President Romano Prodi and several other invited heads of state.

Sea Island was selected for the summit in part because its relative isolation facilitated the extensive security arrangements necessary for such a gathering. As part of the security measures, the Department of Homeland Security (DHS) designated the summit a National Special Security Event (NSSE).

Access to the island was tightly controlled, and press headquarters (the International Media Center) was located in Savannah, Georgia, some 60 miles (97 km) to the north. Protesters and demonstrations were marginalized, in part because the conference venue was located in a nearly inaccessible place.

The leaders and other summit participants discussed issues faced by developing countries in Africa and elsewhere, ranging from peacekeeping operations, HIV/AIDS vaccine development, famine relief, debt reduction, and the eradication of polio.

== Golf ==
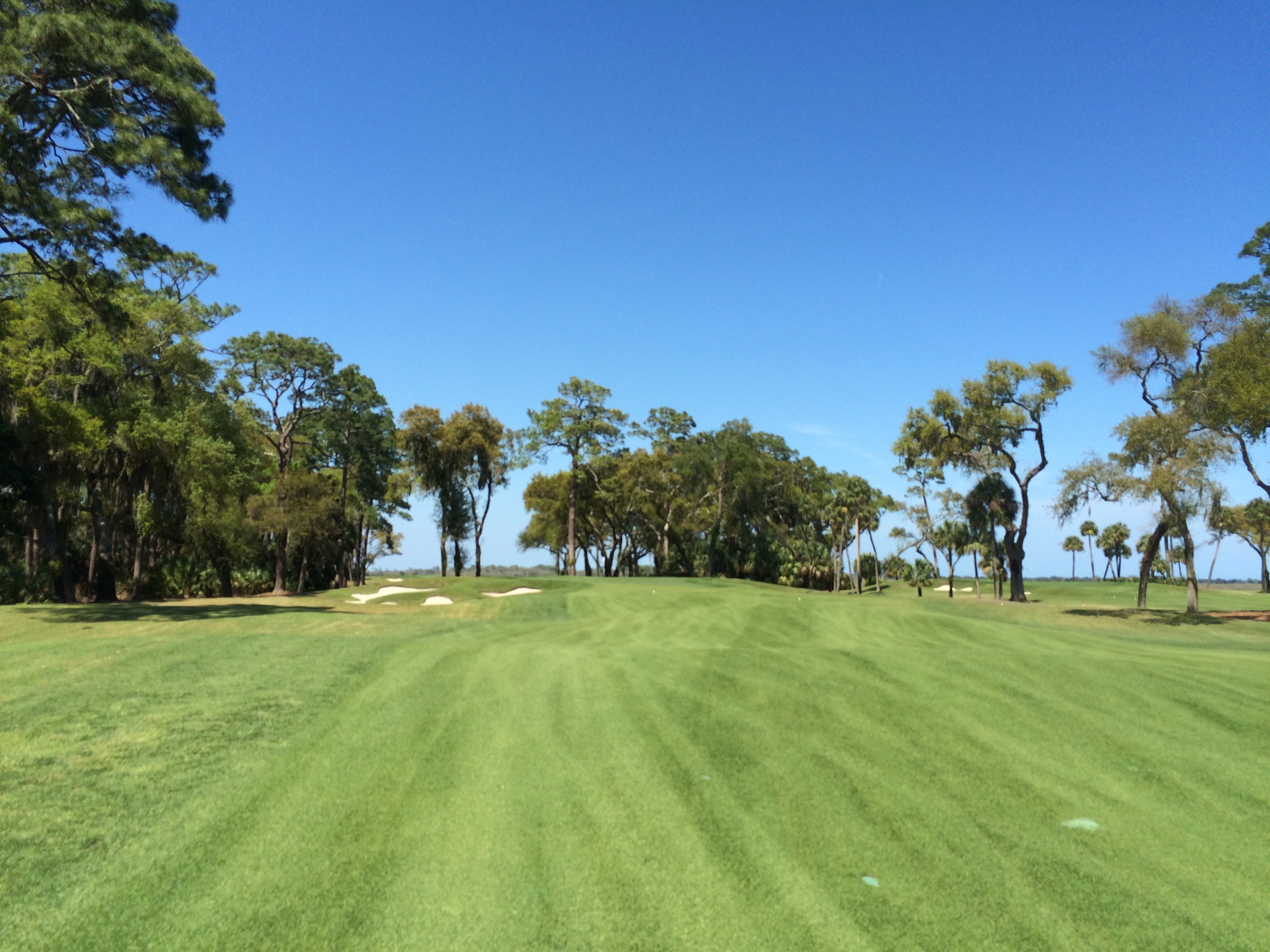
The private Ocean Forest golf club

A significant portion of Sea Island's culture and economy revolves around golf. In 1928, two years after Sea Island Company founder Howard Coffin purchased Retreat Plantation, the first nine-hole course was completed and fittingly named Plantation. The next year the second nine, Seaside, was established. In the near future golf legends such as Bobby Jones, Walter Hagen, and Sam Snead all ventured to Sea Island to play the courses. The first tournament played in the area was the Sea Island Ladies Open Invitational in 1954, which was won by World Golf Hall of Famer Louise Suggs. Over time, the third resort course, Retreat, and two non-resort affiliated courses, Frederica Golf Club and Ocean Forest Golf Club, were also founded on the island.

In 2001, the scope of golf in Sea Island expanded greatly and golf became the centerpiece that it is today in the area. The creation of the Lodge at Sea Island has allowed golfers to stay on the golf course property. Two premier amateur golf tournaments were played at Ocean Forest Golf Club. The Walker Cup, one of the most prestigious amateur events throughout the world, was held in August 2001 and even featured an opening ceremony headlined by President George H. W. Bush. The second tournament held at Ocean Forest was the inaugural Jones Cup Invitational, named after the club's founding family. Since then, the Jones Cup has been played every year at Ocean Forest, and in 2009 the Jones Cup Junior Invitational was created and held at the Seaside course. Both of these events attract golfers from across the country to compete in very exclusive tournaments at extremely challenging venues.

The following year, the largest tournament that is played in Sea Island was founded. The PGA Tour, with the help of host and Sea Island native Davis Love III, held the inaugural McGladrey Classic on both the Plantation and Seaside courses. The Sea Island community has benefited greatly from this event, through increased exposure and the yearly contributions the Davis Love Foundation raises throughout the tournament week. This tournament has helped attract individuals to travel to or live in Sea Island, which has helped grow the economy in the area and led to the expansion of the resort. The tournament is the final tournament of year on the PGA Tour which serves as the season finale for the FedEx Fall, where players play to retain PGA Tour cards, earn spots into signature events, and qualify for major tournaments.

== Education ==
Glynn County's public schools are operated by Glynn County School System.

Zoned schools include:

- Oglethorpe Point Elementary School (OPES)
- Glynn Middle School (GMS)
- Glynn Academy (GA)

== See also ==
- List of G8 summit resorts
