= Goodrum =

Goodrum is an English surname and a place name in America. It may refer to:

== People with the surname ==
- Alexander John Goodrum (1960–2002), American writer, educator, and civil rights activist on behalf of gender identity and sexual orientation
- Charlie Goodrum (1950–2013), American footballer
- Niko Goodrum (born 1992), American baseball player
- Phillip Goodrum (born 1997), American soccer player
- Randy Goodrum (born 1947), American songwriter, pianist, and music producer
- Sara Goodrum (born ?), American MLB director and coach

== Origin ==
The surname is English, primarily from Norfolk, deriving from Old Norse, possibly originally Guðormr, a compound of guð (meaning "god") + ormr ("snake" or "serpent"); or Guðþormr, a compound of guð + þormr ("to respect or honor" or "to spare").

== Places ==
- Goodrum Junction, historical location within Liberty Township, Porter County, Indiana, USA
- May Patterson Goodrum House (built 1932), historic American home and museum in Atlanta, Georgia

== See also ==
- Delta Goodrem (born 1984), Australian singer, songwriter, television personality and actress
