= Dock Junction, Georgia =

- Unincorporated community Census-designated place
- Location in Glynn County and the state of Georgia
- Coordinates: 31°12′4″N 81°30′25″W
- Country: United States
- State: Georgia
- County: Glynn

Area
  - Total: 10.61 sq mi (27.49 km^{2})
  - Land: 9.39 sq mi (24.32 km^{2})
  - Water: 1.22 sq mi (3.17 km^{2})
- Elevation: 3.3 ft (1 m)

Population (2020)
  - Total: 8,266
  - Density: 880.2/sq mi (339.86/km^{2})
- Time zone: UTC-5 (Eastern (EST))
  - Summer (DST): UTC-4 (EDT)
- FIPS code: 13-23200
- GNIS feature ID: 1867239

Dock Junction is an unincorporated community and census-designated place (CDP) in Glynn County, Georgia, United States. It is part of the Brunswick metropolitan statistical area. The population was 7,721 at the 2010 census, growing to 8,266 in 2020. Its original name was Arco until the 1970s, the name deriving from the Atlantic Refining Company.

== Geography ==
Dock Junction is located at 31°12′4″N 81°30′25″W (31.201106, -81.506921).

According to the United States Census Bureau, the CDP has a total area of 10.7 square miles (28 km^{2}), of which 9.6 square miles (25 km^{2}) is land and 1.1 square miles (2.8 km^{2}) (10.66%) is water.

== Demographics ==
Historical population
Census	Pop.	Note	%±
1950	4,160		—
1960	5,417		30.2%
1970	6,009		10.9%
1980	6,189		3.0%
1990	7,094		14.6%
2000	6,951		−2.0%
2010	7,721		11.1%
2020	8,266		7.1%
U.S. Decennial Census; 1850-1870 1870-1880; 1890-1910 1920-1930; 1940 1950 1960; 1970 1980 1990; 2000 2010 2020

Dock Junction was first listed as an unincorporated place in 1950 and designated a census designated place in 1980.

=== Racial and ethnic composition ===
Dock Junction, Georgia – Racial and ethnic composition Note: the US Census treats Hispanic/Latino as an ethnic category. This table excludes Latinos from the racial categories and assigns them to a separate category. Hispanics/Latinos may be of any race.
Race / Ethnicity (NH = Non-Hispanic)	Pop 2000	Pop 2010	Pop 2020	% 2000	% 2010	% 2020
White alone (NH)	4,634	4,461	4,168	66.67%	57.78%	50.42%
Black or African American alone (NH)	2,005	2,127	2,533	28.84%	27.55%	30.64%
Native American or Alaska Native alone (NH)	12	14	12	0.17%	0.18%	0.15%
Asian alone (NH)	26	115	125	0.37%	1.49%	1.51%
Pacific Islander alone (NH)	9	0	8	0.13%	0.00%	0.10%
Some Other Race alone (NH)	4	7	48	0.06%	0.09%	0.58%
Mixed race or Multiracial (NH)	50	130	336	0.72%	1.68%	4.06%
Hispanic or Latino (any race)	211	867	1,036	3.04%	11.23%	12.53%
Total	6,951	7,721	8,266	100.00%	100.00%	100.00%

=== 2020 census ===
As of the 2020 census, Dock Junction had a population of 8,266. The median age was 37.9 years. 22.0% of residents were under the age of 18 and 16.9% of residents were 65 years of age or older. For every 100 females there were 101.6 males, and for every 100 females age 18 and over there were 98.7 males age 18 and over.

98.2% of residents lived in urban areas, while 1.8% lived in rural areas.

There were 3,243 households in Dock Junction, including 1,942 families. Of those households, 30.3% had children under the age of 18 living in them. Of all households, 33.8% were married-couple households, 20.8% were households with a male householder and no spouse or partner present, and 38.0% were households with a female householder and no spouse or partner present. About 31.7% of all households were made up of individuals and 13.0% had someone living alone who was 65 years of age or older.

There were 3,609 housing units, of which 10.1% were vacant. The homeowner vacancy rate was 1.6% and the rental vacancy rate was 7.3%.

== Education ==
The community's public schools are operated by Glynn County School System.

Zoned schools serving sections of the CDP include:

- Glyndale Elementary School (GES), Golden Isles Elementary School (GIE), Goodyear Elementary School (GOE), and Sterling Elementary School (SES)
- Glynn Middle School (GMS), Jane Macon Middle School (JMS), Needwood Middle School (NMS), and Risley Middle School (RMS)
- Brunswick High School (BHS) and Glynn Academy (GA)
