= Country Club Estates, Georgia =

- Unincorporated community Census-designated place
- Location in Glynn County and the state of Georgia
- Coordinates: 31°12′41″N 81°28′7″W
- Country: United States
- State: Georgia
- County: Glynn

Area
  - Total: 4.76 sq mi (12.33 km^{2})
  - Land: 4.63 sq mi (11.99 km^{2})
  - Water: 0.13 sq mi (0.34 km^{2})
- Elevation: 12 ft (3.7 m)

Population (2020)
  - Total: 8,373
  - Density: 1,808.4/sq mi (698.23/km^{2})
- Time zone: UTC-5 (Eastern (EST))
  - Summer (DST): UTC-4 (EDT)
- FIPS code: 13-19830
- GNIS feature ID: 1867238

Country Club Estates is an unincorporated community and census-designated place (CDP) in Glynn County, Georgia, United States. It is part of the Brunswick metropolitan statistical area. The population was 8,373 at the 2020 census, down from 8,545 in 2010.

== Geography ==
Country Club Estates is located at 31°12′41″N 81°28′7″W (31.211438, -81.468663). It is bordered to the south by the city of Brunswick and to the east by the Back River, an arm of the tidal Mackay River. U.S. Route 17 passes through the center of the CDP, leading south 5 miles (8 km) into downtown Brunswick and north 12 miles (19 km) to Darien. The CDP extends north as far as Chapel Crossing Road west of US 17 and Yacht Drive east of US 17.

According to the United States Census Bureau, the CDP has a total area of 4.7 square miles (12.3 km^{2}), of which 4.6 square miles (12.0 km^{2}) is land and 0.1 square miles (0.3 km^{2}), or 2.23%, is water.

== Demographics ==
Historical population
Census	Pop.	Note	%±
1990	5,192		—
2000	7,594		46.3%
2010	8,545		12.5%
2020	8,373		−2.0%
U.S. Decennial Census; 1850-1870 1870-1880; 1890-1910 1920-1930; 1940 1950 1960; 1970 1980 1990; 2000 2010 2020

Country Club Estates was first listed as a CDP in the 1990 U.S. census.

=== Racial and ethnic composition ===
Country Club Estates, Georgia – Racial and ethnic composition Note: the US Census treats Hispanic/Latino as an ethnic category. This table excludes Latinos from the racial categories and assigns them to a separate category. Hispanics/Latinos may be of any race.
Race / Ethnicity (NH = Non-Hispanic)	Pop 2000	Pop 2010	Pop 2020	% 2000	% 2010	% 2020
White alone (NH)	4,171	3,590	3,367	54.92%	42.01%	40.21%
Black or African American alone (NH)	2,940	3,934	3,636	38.71%	46.04%	43.43%
Native American or Alaska Native alone (NH)	23	19	20	0.30%	0.22%	0.24%
Asian alone (NH)	83	143	142	1.09%	1.67%	1.70%
Pacific Islander alone (NH)	10	45	42	0.13%	0.53%	0.50%
Some Other Race alone (NH)	10	20	36	0.13%	0.23%	0.43%
Mixed race or Multiracial (NH)	103	144	282	1.36%	1.69%	3.37%
Hispanic or Latino (any race)	254	650	848	3.34%	7.61%	10.13%
Total	7,594	8,545	8,373	100.00%	100.00%	100.00%

=== 2020 census ===
As of the 2020 census, Country Club Estates had a population of 8,373. The median age was 38.0 years. 22.7% of residents were under the age of 18 and 17.1% of residents were 65 years of age or older. For every 100 females there were 86.7 males, and for every 100 females age 18 and over there were 82.5 males age 18 and over.

93.1% of residents lived in urban areas, while 6.9% lived in rural areas.

There were 3,553 households in Country Club Estates, and there were 1,869 families residing in the CDP. Of all households, 27.1% had children under the age of 18 living in them, 31.8% were married-couple households, 22.3% were households with a male householder and no spouse or partner present, and 38.7% were households with a female householder and no spouse or partner present. About 35.0% of all households were made up of individuals and 13.6% had someone living alone who was 65 years of age or older.

There were 3,971 housing units, of which 10.5% were vacant. The homeowner vacancy rate was 2.3% and the rental vacancy rate was 9.9%.

== Education ==
The community's public schools are operated by the Glynn County School System.

Zoned schools serving sections of the CDP include:

- Altama Elementary School (AES) and C. B. Greer Elementary School (GRE)
- Needwood Middle School (NMS) and Jane Macon Middle School (JMS) (small section)
- Brunswick High School (BHS) and Glynn Academy (GA)
