= National Register of Historic Places listings in McDuffie County, Georgia =

Map of Georgia highlighting McDuffie County

This is a list of properties and districts in McDuffie County, Georgia that are listed on the National Register of Historic Places (NRHP).

This National Park Service list is complete through NPS recent listings posted May 1, 2026.

== Current listings ==
	Name on the Register	Image	Date listed	Location	City or town	Description
1	Boneville Historic District		February 10, 2000 (#00000072)	Jct. of Boneville Rd. and the Georgia RR, approx. 5 mi. SE of Thomson; 33°25′59″N 82°26′17″W	Boneville	
2	Bowdre-Rees-Knox House	Bowdre-Rees-Knox House	January 19, 1979 (#79003109)	SW of Thomson on Old Wrightsboro Rd. 33°32′17″N 82°32′52″W	Thomson	
3	Thomas Carr District		December 6, 1975 (#75002059)	N of Thomason near jct. of GA 150 and I-20; 33°31′43″N 82°26′33″W	Thomson	
4	James L. Hardaway House	James L. Hardaway House	September 16, 1993 (#93000942)	Old Mesena Rd. W of Thomson; 33°26′53″N 82°34′41″W	Thomson	
5	Hayes Line Historic District		February 18, 2000 (#00000106)	Jct. of Twin Oaks Rd. and GA 223; 33°28′17″N 82°31′06″W	Thomson	
6	Hickory Hill	Hickory Hill	November 15, 1979 (#79003110)	Hickory Hill Dr. and Lee St. 33°28′18″N 82°30′46″W	Thomson	Includes the Thomas Watson house and other structures
7	Hillman-Bowden House		November 1, 2002 (#02001259)	1348 Pyland Crossing Rd. 33°26′31″N 82°33′23″W	Thomson	
8	John Moore Lazenby House	John Moore Lazenby House	May 8, 2013 (#13000241)	1353 Cedar Rock Rd. 33°29′04″N 82°31′36″W	Thomson vicinity	
9	McNeill House		November 27, 1992 (#92001637)	220 Lee St. 33°28′02″N 82°30′28″W	Thomson	
10	Old Rock House	Old Rock House	December 29, 1970 (#70000841)	NW of Thomson on Old Rock House Rd. 33°28′56″N 82°33′28″W	Thomson	The property is owned by McDuffee County as of 2020. It is the oldest well-documented house in Georgia.
11	Pine Top Farm		June 5, 1996 (#96000582)	Jct. of US 78 and US 278, 2 mi. E of Thomson; 33°27′24″N 82°28′04″W	Thomson	
12	Sweetwater Inn		May 2, 1985 (#85000938)	Off GA 17 on Old Milledgeville Rd. 33°24′58″N 82°27′19″W	Thomson	
13	Thomson Commercial Historic District	Thomson Commercial Historic District	June 9, 1989 (#89000413)	Roughly bounded by Journal St., Greenway St., Railroad St., Hendricks St., and Church St. 33°27′58″N 82°30′05″W	Thomson	A boundary revision was approved July 15, 2025.
14	Usry House	Usry House	October 1, 1974 (#74002182)	211 Milledge St. 33°27′58″N 82°30′20″W	Thomson	
15	Thomas E. Watson House	Thomas E. Watson House	May 11, 1976 (#76002144)	310 Lumpkin St. 33°28′12″N 82°30′30″W	Thomson	Home of Georgia Populist Party co-founder Thomas E. Watson, is a National Historic Landmark, Watson-Brown Foundation website. The house is part of Hickory Hill.
16	Wrightsboro Historic District		July 6, 1998 (#98000701)	Wrightsboro Rd., E. of Ridge Rd. 33°33′00″N 82°34′09″W	Wrightsboro	
