= Everett, Georgia =

Coordinates: 31°23′26.0″N 81°38′18.9″W

Everett
- Unincorporated community Census-designated place
- Location within Georgia Location within the United States
- Country: United States
- State: Georgia
- County: Glynn

Population (2020)
  - Total: 158
- Time zone: UTC−6 (Central (CST))
  - Summer (DST): UTC−5 (CDT)

Everett, Georgia is a small, rural unincorporated community and census-designated place (CDP) in Glynn County, Georgia, United States (not to be confused with another Everett located in Thomas County).

It first appeared as a CDP in the 2020 Census with a population of 158.

== History ==
Robert Hammond Everett (1850-1935) of Brunswick, Georgia, once owned large tracts of timber in the vicinity and operated a lumber and cypress shingle mill near the railroad junction, which was named for him. It was originally chartered as Everett City, Georgia in 1894, but lost its municipality status about ten years later, having failed to grow as hoped.

It was once the location of a bustling railroad junction shared by the Southern Railway (SOU) and the Seaboard Air Line Railroad (SAL), with a yard tower, freight house, passenger depot, stock yard, and about a half-dozen 'section houses' occupied by employees of these carriers. By the end of the 1960s, all of these facilities had been removed, and by the end of the 1970s only the Southern Railway (now the Norfolk Southern Railway, NS) retained tracks through the community. The Everett lumber mill operations closed before World War II.

== Demographics ==
Historical population
Census	Pop.	Note	%±
2020	158		—
U.S. Decennial Census; 2020

Everett was first listed as a census designated place in the 2020 U.S. census.

Everett CDP, Georgia – Racial and ethnic composition Note: the US Census treats Hispanic/Latino as an ethnic category. This table excludes Latinos from the racial categories and assigns them to a separate category. Hispanics/Latinos may be of any race.
Race / Ethnicity (NH = Non-Hispanic)	Pop 2020	% 2020
White alone (NH)	158	83.54%
Black or African American alone (NH)	17	10.76%
Native American or Alaska Native alone (NH)	0	0.00%
Asian alone (NH)	0	0.00%
Pacific Islander alone (NH)	0	0.00%
Other race alone (NH)	0	0.00%
Mixed race or Multiracial (NH)	8	5.06%
Hispanic or Latino (any race)	1	0.63%
Total	158	100.00%

== Education ==
Glynn County's public schools are operated by Glynn County School System.

Zoned schools include:

- Sterling Elementary School (SES)
- Jane Macon Middle School (JMS)
- Brunswick High School (BHS)
