= Sterling, Georgia =

- Unincorporated community Census-designated place
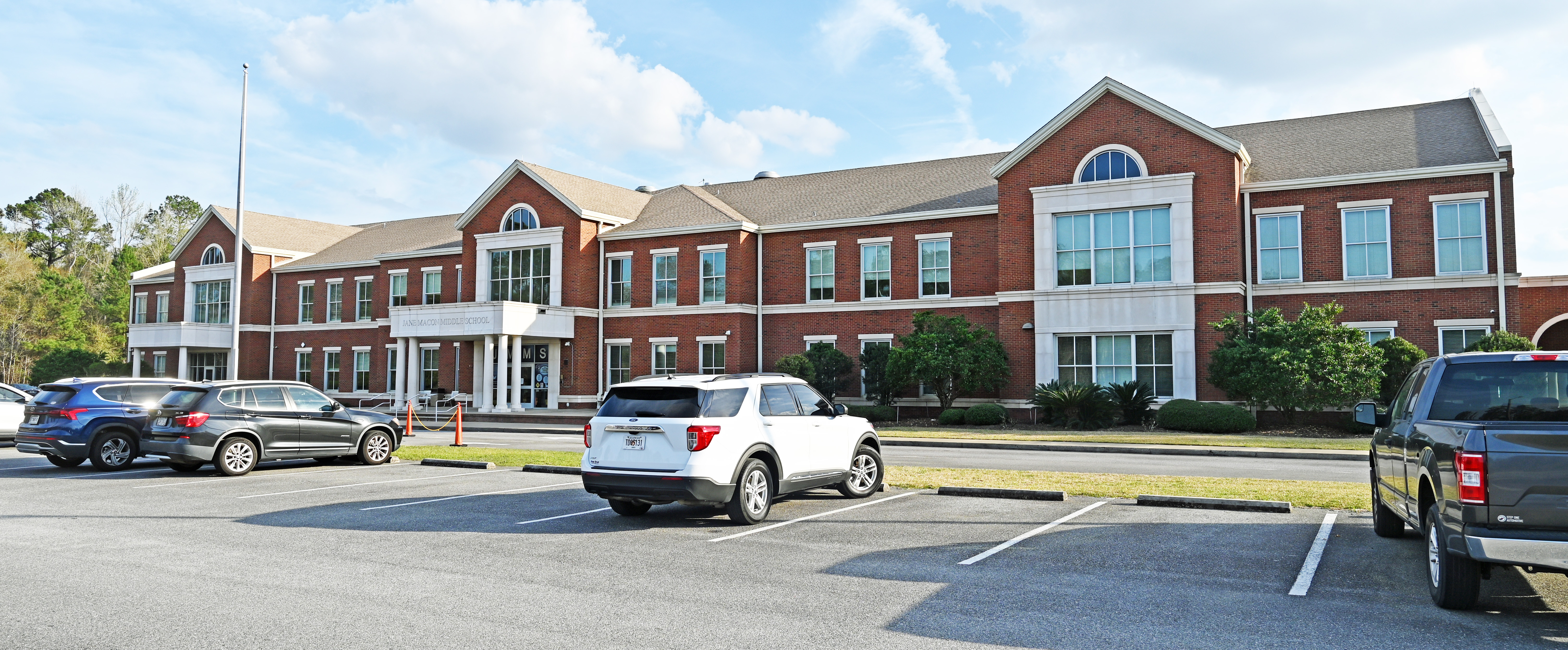
- Jane Macon Middle School

- Location within Georgia Location within the United States
- Coordinates: 31.272°N 81.562°W
- Country: United States
- State: Georgia
- County: Glynn

Area
  - Total: 4.33 sq mi (11.21 km^{2})
  - Land: 4.31 sq mi (11.15 km^{2})
  - Water: 0.023 sq mi (0.06 km^{2})
- Elevation: 3 ft (0.91 m)

Population (2020)
  - Total: 2,534
  - Density: 588.5/sq mi (227.21/km^{2})
- Time zone: UTC-5 (Eastern (EST))
  - Summer (DST): UTC-4 (EDT)
- ZIP Code: 31525
- Area code: 912
- FIPS code: 13-73452

Sterling is an unincorporated community and census-designated place (CDP) in Glynn County, Georgia, United States, located on U.S. Route 341. Sterling consists of several small churches and general stores. It is included in the Brunswick, Georgia statistical area.

The 2020 census listed a population of 2,534.

Sterling formerly had a station on the Macon and Brunswick Railroad.

== Demographics ==
Historical population
Census	Pop.	Note	%±
2020	2,534		—
U.S. Decennial Census; 2020

Sterling was first listed as a census designated place in the 2020 U.S. census.

=== 2020 census ===
As of the 2020 census, Sterling had a population of 2,534. The median age was 34.6 years. 29.6% of residents were under the age of 18 and 11.5% of residents were 65 years of age or older. For every 100 females there were 95.7 males, and for every 100 females age 18 and over there were 93.9 males age 18 and over.

83.3% of residents lived in urban areas, while 16.7% lived in rural areas.

There were 894 households in Sterling, of which 39.1% had children under the age of 18 living in them. Of all households, 47.5% were married-couple households, 18.1% were households with a male householder and no spouse or partner present, and 26.0% were households with a female householder and no spouse or partner present. About 22.2% of all households were made up of individuals and 9.2% had someone living alone who was 65 years of age or older.

There were 988 housing units, of which 9.5% were vacant. The homeowner vacancy rate was 0.3% and the rental vacancy rate was 7.4%.

Sterling CDP, Georgia – Racial and ethnic composition Note: the US Census treats Hispanic/Latino as an ethnic category. This table excludes Latinos from the racial categories and assigns them to a separate category. Hispanics/Latinos may be of any race.
Race / Ethnicity (NH = Non-Hispanic)	Pop 2020	% 2020
White alone (NH)	1,402	55.33%
Black or African American alone (NH)	485	19.14%
Native American or Alaska Native alone (NH)	15	0.59%
Asian alone (NH)	54	2.13%
Pacific Islander alone (NH)	3	0.12%
Other race alone (NH)	11	0.43%
Mixed race or Multiracial (NH)	119	4.70%
Hispanic or Latino (any race)	445	17.56%
Total	2,534	100.00%

== Education ==
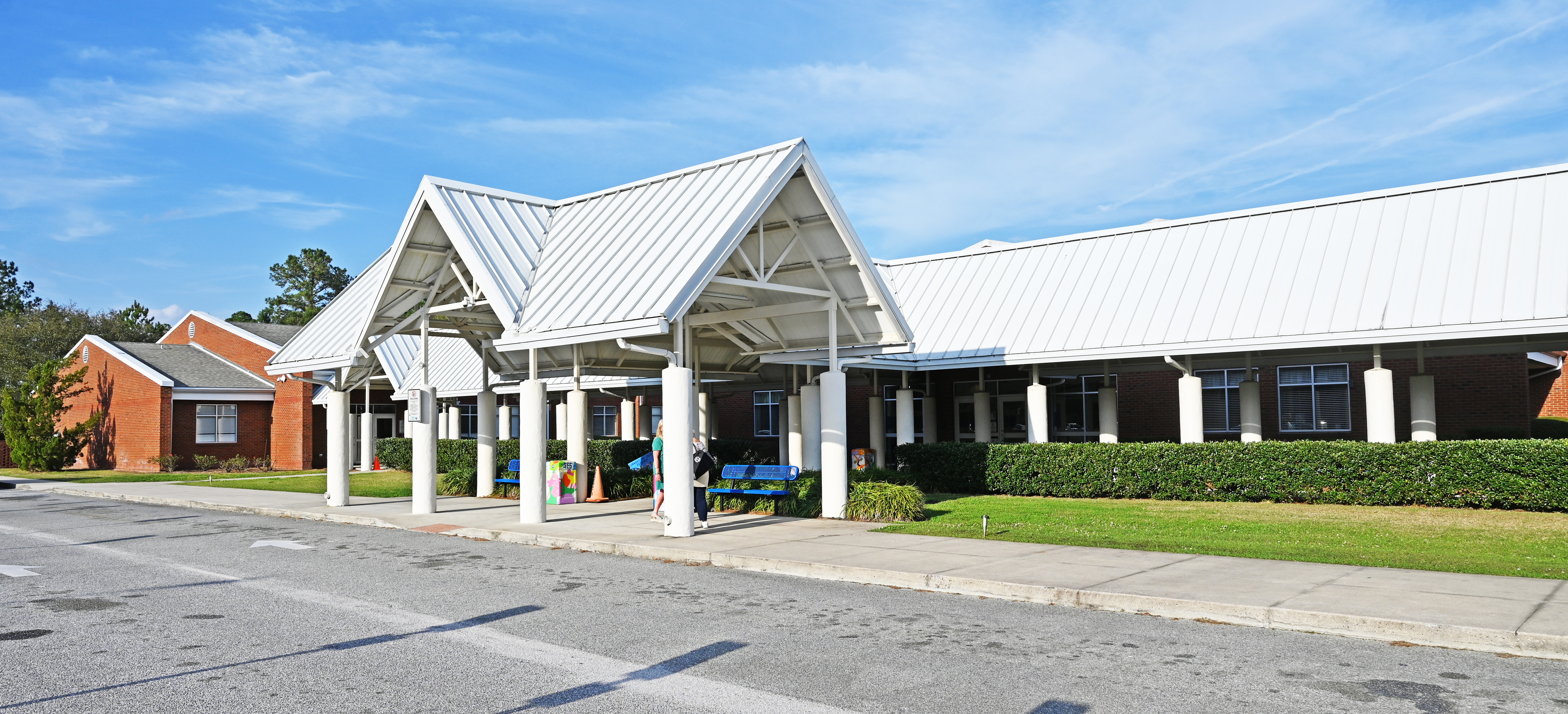
Sterling Elementary School

Glynn County's public schools are operated by Glynn County School System.

Zoned schools include:

- Sterling Elementary School (SES)
- Jane Macon Middle School (JMS)
- Brunswick High School (BHS)
