= T. R. R. Cobb House =

Historic house in Georgia, United States

- U.S. National Register of Historic Places
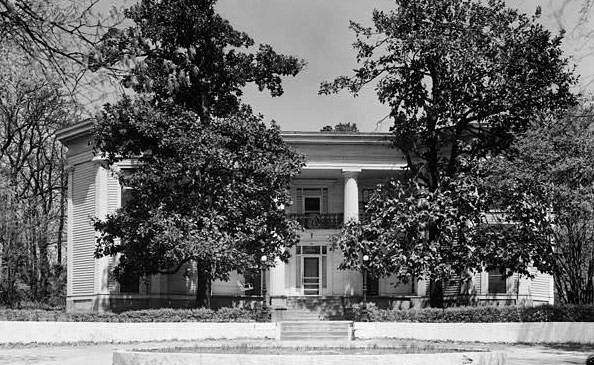
- T. R. R. Cobb House in 1940

- Location within Georgia Location within the United States
- Location: 175 Hill Street, Athens, Georgia
- Coordinates: 33°57′37″N 83°23′07″W
- Built: 1834
- Architectural style: Greek Revival, Octagon Mode
- NRHP reference No.: 75000579
- Added to NRHP: June 30, 1975

The T. R. R. Cobb House built in 1842 is an historic octagon house originally located at 194 Prince Avenue in Athens, Georgia. On June 30, 1975, it was added to the National Register of Historic Places.

The original part of the home of Thomas Reade Rootes Cobb is a Greek Revival four-over-four "Plantation Plain" built about 1834. The house given in 1844 to Cobb and his new wife, Marion Lumpkin, as a gift from his father-in-law, Joseph Henry Lumpkin, the first Chief Justice of the Georgia Supreme Court. Cobb made additions to the house of new rooms, and by 1852, it had acquired its octagon shape and two-story portico. Cobb died in 1862, and his widow remained in the house until 1873 when she sold it. The house was maintained and the Cobb family was served by the two dozen enslaved people Cobb owned, who lived behind the main house.

Until 1962, the house was used for a variety of purposes including rental property, a fraternity house, and a boarding house. In 1962, the Archdiocese of Atlanta bought the house to use as the rectory and offices for St. Joseph Catholic Church. In the 1980s, the parish was planning to demolish the house, and the Stone Mountain Memorial Association stepped forward in 1984, bought it, and relocated it to Stone Mountain Park in 1985.

The restoration of the house never took place because of lack of funding, and the house sat for nearly twenty years. In 2004 the Watson-Brown Foundation bought the house and returned it to Athens in the spring of 2005. The Watson-Brown Foundation restored the house to its appearance of 1850; in 2008, the Georgia Trust gave their work its Preservation Award for excellence in restoration.

The house was delisted from the National Register in 1985, but was re-listed on July 23, 2013.

The house is now open as a house museum located at 175 Hill Street in Cobbham Historic District. The same foundation also operates other historic house museums in Georgia including Hickory Hill in Thomson and the May Patterson Goodrum House in Atlanta.
