= ReShard Lee =

American football player (born 1980)

No. 32, 42
- Position: Running back

Personal information
- Born: October 12, 1980 (age 46); Brunswick, Georgia, U.S.
- Listed height: 5 ft 10 in (1.78 m)
- Listed weight: 220 lb (100 kg)

Career information
- High school: Brunswick
- College: Middle Tennessee State
- NFL draft: 2003: undrafted

Career history
- Dallas Cowboys (2003–2004); Buffalo Bills (2005)*; Minnesota Vikings (2005)*; Green Bay Packers (2005); Oakland Raiders (2006–2007)
- * Offseason or practice squad member only

Awards and highlights
- 2× second-team All-Sun Belt (2001, 2002)

Career NFL statistics
- Rushing attempts: 59
- Rushing yards: 216
- Rushing touchdowns: 3
- Receptions: 22
- Receiving yards: 147
- Return yards: 1,332
- Stats at Pro Football Reference

ReShard Lee (born October 12, 1980) is an American former professional football player who was a running back in the National Football League (NFL) for the Dallas Cowboys, Green Bay Packers and Oakland Raiders. He played college football for the Middle Tennessee Blue Raiders.

== Early life ==
Lee attended Brunswick High School, where he played quarterback. As a senior, he passed for 1,600 yards and 18 touchdowns, while running for 670 yards and 8 touchdowns, contributing to 14 straight wins before losing in the Class AAAA championship game. He received honorable-mention USA Today All-American, Class AAAA first-team and WTOC-TV Player of the Year honors. He finished his eligibility with 4,175 passing yards, 56 passing touchdowns and 73 rushing touchdowns.

He accepted a football scholarship from Middle Tennessee State University, where he was converted to running back. He did not compete in 2000, after failing to meet academic requirements. He became a starter in 2001 at running back, rushing 108 times for 790 yards (7.3-yard average) and 4 touchdowns, made 9 catches for 87 yards and returned 13 kickoffs for 263 yards. He was a multi-purpose player, seeing snaps also at quarterback, wide receiver and on special teams.

As a junior, he appeared in 11 games (5 starts), registering 642 rushing yards (second on the team), 6 touchdowns, 12 receptions for 78 yds, completed 3 out of 4 passes for 81 yards and added 12 kickoff returns for 252 yards. He declared for the NFL draft after the season, finishing his career with 218 carries for 1,432 rushing yards (6.6-yard average).

== Professional career ==
=== Dallas Cowboys ===
Lee was signed as an undrafted free agent by the Dallas Cowboys after the 2003 NFL draft. After injuring his left knee in a preseason game and needing surgery to repair ligament damage, he was waived with an injury settlement on August 26. He then rehabilitated on his own for four months, before being re-signed to the Cowboys practice squad on December 2.

In 2004, he played in 14 games, collecting 128 rushing yards, 4 receiving yards and one touchdown. He led the team in kickoff returns with a 23.5- yard average on 41 returns for 964 yards. He was released on May 3, 2005, after the team brought in new running back talent (Marion Barber, Anthony Thomas and Tyson Thompson).

=== Buffalo Bills ===
On May 13, 2005, he signed with the Buffalo Bills as a free agent. After competing for a backup running back role, he was cut on August 28.

=== Minnesota Vikings ===
The Minnesota Vikings claimed him off waivers on August 30, 2005. After being tried as a kickoff returner, he was released on September 3.

=== Green Bay Packers ===
On October 6, 2005, he was signed as a free agent by the Green Bay Packers. With the season ending injury to Najeh Davenport, he became the team's top backup at running back. Running backs Ahman Green and Tony Fisher were later hurt also, making him the starter in week 9 against the Pittsburgh Steelers. After he fumbled on his second carry of the game, Samkon Gado replaced him and became a "feel good story", earning the starter position for the next 5 games. In week 12, he injured his ribs playing against the Philadelphia Eagles and was placed on the injured reserve list on December 1. He was waived injured on December 5.

=== Oakland Raiders ===
On May 8, 2006, he signed with the Oakland Raiders as a free agent. He played in his first full NFL season and started 3 games. He registered 72 rushing yards, 20 receptions for 138 yards, 2 touchdowns and 4 special teams tackles. In 2007, after injuring his knee during a training camp practice, he was waived injured on August 2.
