= Sweetwater Inn =

- U.S. National Register of Historic Places
- Location within Georgia Location within the United States
- Nearest city: Thomson, Georgia
- Coordinates: 33°24′58″N 82°27′19″W
- Area: 1.8 acres (0.73 ha)
- Architectural style: Plantation Plain
- NRHP reference No.: 85000938
- Added to NRHP: May 2, 1985

Sweetwater Inn is a property in McDuffie County, Georgia, near Thomson, that is listed on the National Register of Historic Places. It is located off Georgia Highway 17 on Old Milledgeville Road. The structure on the property functioned as a residence and an inn. It was built in 1826. It was added to the National Register of Historic Places on May 2, 1985. At the time of its National Register listing, it was not in use.

== See also ==
- National Register of Historic Places listings in McDuffie County, Georgia
