= Hickory Hill (Thomson, Georgia) =

Historic house in Georgia, US

- Thomas E. Watson House
- U.S. National Register of Historic Places
- U.S. National Historic Landmark
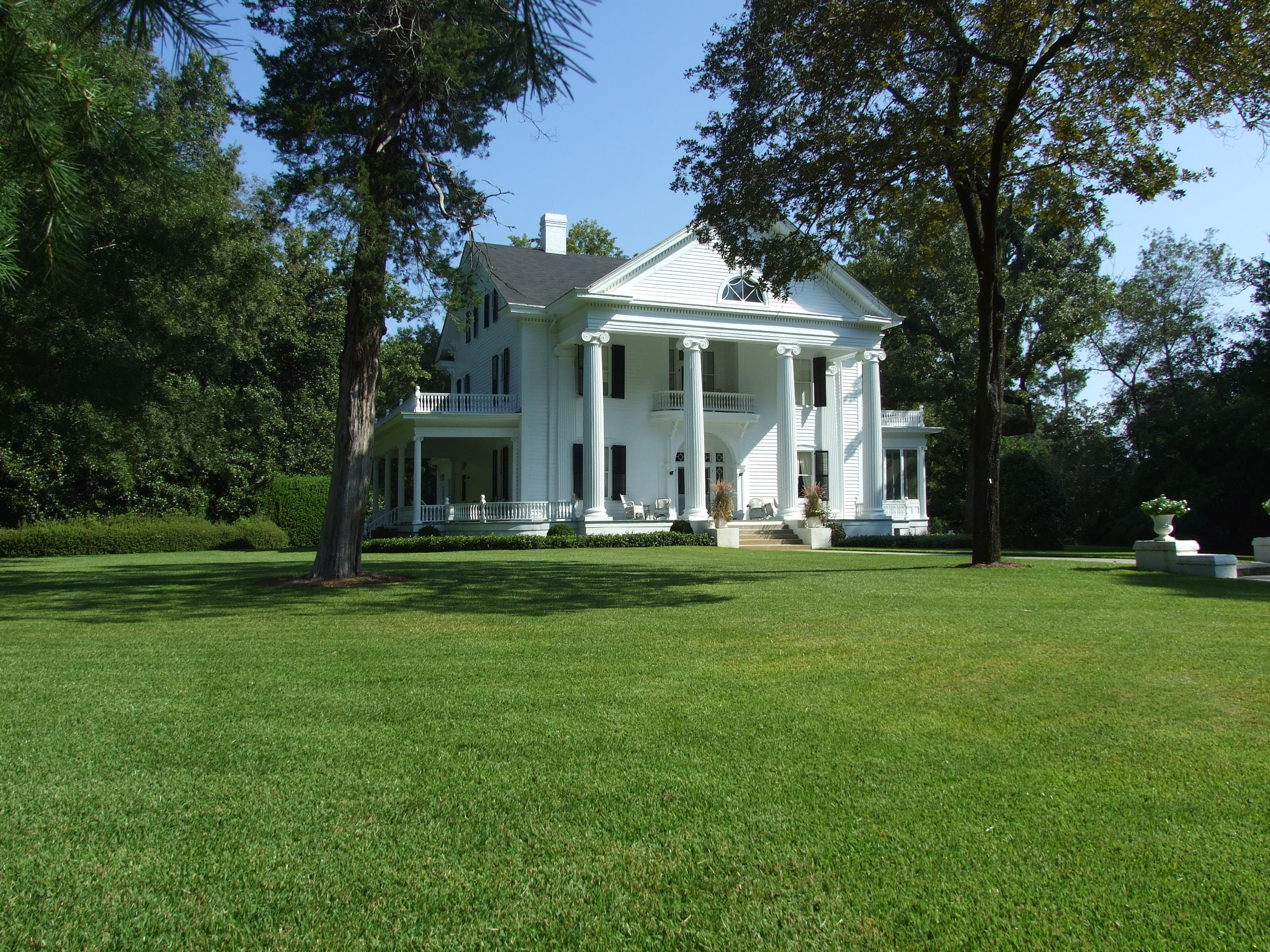

- Location within Georgia Location within the United States
- Location: 502 Hickory Hill Drive, Thomson, Georgia
- Coordinates: 33°28′15″N 82°30′43″W
- Area: 70 acres (28 ha)
- Built: 1864
- Architect: Wilson, John; Thomas E. Watson
- Architectural style: Greek Revival
- NRHP reference No.: 76002144 and 79003110

Significant dates
- Added to NRHP: May 11, 1976
- Designated NHL: May 11, 1976

Hickory Hill is a historic house museum at 502 Hickory Hill Drive in Thomson, Georgia. A National Historic Landmark, it was a home of Georgia Populist Party co-founder Thomas E. Watson (1856-1922). The main house was added to the National Register of Historic Places (NRHP) in 1976 (#76002144) and the whole site was added to the NRHP in 1979 (#79003110).

== Description and history ==
Hickory Hill is located on a wooded 70-acre (28 ha) parcel of land, bounded on the north by Magnolia Drive, the east by North Lee Street, the south by Hickory Hill Drive, and the west by the Thomson city line. The centerpiece of the estate is a handsome two story wood-frame house, with a side gable roof and weatherboard siding. A large Neoclassical Revival dentillated and pedimented portico projects from its front, supported by four two-story Ionic columns.

The core of the house is an Italianate structure, built about 1864 by Captain John Wilson. It was purchased in 1900 by Thomas E. Watson, a Thomson native who was then already a significant force in Georgia politics. Watson spent several years altering and modernizing the house, transforming it into a Neoclassical Revival masterpiece, and introducing all of the latest modern amenities, including running water, central heat, and electric lighting, the first place in the city with that feature. The house remained his home until his death in 1922. In 1954 it passed to his grandson, Walter Brown, and is now owned by the nonprofit Watson-Brown Foundation.

Hickory Hill is one of three houses associated with Thomas E. Watson in Thomson, all three of which are now owned by the same foundation and operated as museum properties. His birthplace, a crude log cabin, was moved from the plantation on which he was born to its present location at Tom Watson Way and Bethany Drive and restored. His home before Hickory Hill is adjacent to the cabin, at 310 Tom Watson Way. The foundation also operates other historic house museums in Georgia including T. R. R. Cobb House in Athens and the May Patterson Goodrum House in Atlanta.

== See also ==
- List of National Historic Landmarks in Georgia (U.S. state)
- National Register of Historic Places listings in McDuffie County, Georgia
