= Athos Menaboni =

Italian-born American artist

- Born: Athos Rodolfo Giorgio Alessandro Menaboni; October 20, 1895; Livorno, Italy
- Died: July 18, 1990 (aged 94); Atlanta, Georgia
- Education: Accademia di Belle Arti di Firenze
- Occupations: Artist (Most famous for naturalist paintings of birds and botanicals)
- Years active: 1921-1987
- Spouse: Sara Regina Arnold Menaboni (m. 1928)

Athos Rodolfo Giorgio Alessandro Menaboni (October 20, 1895 – July 18, 1990) was an Italian-born American artist who spent the bulk of his career in Atlanta, Georgia.

== Early life and education ==
Menaboni was born in Livorno, Italy, and developed a profound affinity for nature from his early years. Raised in a family with a strong connection to the maritime world, his father, Averardo, was a successful ship chandler. Young Athos developed a lifelong love for birds and animals that would later inspire his art.

Menaboni's artistic talent emerged early. At age nine, he began art lessons with painter Ugo Manaresi and muralist Charles Doudelet. Later, he continued his artistic education at the Academy of Fine Arts in Florence until World War I disrupted his studies.

== Career ==
After serving in the Italian army during World War I, Menaboni immigrated to the United States in 1921, initially settling in New York City. He eventually found his way to Atlanta, where he would spend the rest of his life. In Atlanta, Menaboni's artistic talents quickly caught the attention of prominent architect Philip Trammell Shutze, leading to numerous commissions for decorative painting in private residences and public buildings.

=== Bird paintings ===
In 1937, Menaboni's artistic focus shifted when he returned to his childhood interest in birds. Inspired by the avian wonders he observed in nature, Menaboni began meticulously painting birds in their natural habitats. His oil paintings, often mistaken for watercolors due to their delicate and lifelike quality, became his signature style.

The following have been drawn or painted by Athos Menaboni:

1. American Black Duck
2. American Coot
3. American Crow
4. American Golden Plover
5. American Goldfinch
6. American Kestrel (also called Sparrow Hawk)
7. American Redstart
8. American Robin
9. American Wigeon
10. American Woodcock
11. Ani
12. Bald Eagle
13. Baltimore Oriole
14. Barn Owl
15. Barn Swallow
16. Barred Owl
17. Belted Kingfisher
18. Black Brant Goose
19. Black Francolin
20. Black Grouse
21. Black Minorca
22. Black Skimmer
23. Black-crowned Night-Heron
24. Black-necked Stilt
25. Blue Grosbeak
26. Blue Jay
27. Blue-winged Teal
28. Boat-tailed Grackle
29. Bobolink
30. Bonapart's Gull
31. Bronzed Grackle
32. Brown Leghorn
33. Brown Pelican
34. Brown Thrasher
35. Bufflehead
36. California Gull
37. California Quail (also called Valley Quail)
38. Canada Goose
39. Canvasback
40. Capercaillie
41. Carolina Chickadee
42. Cedar Waxwing
43. Chukar Partridge
44. Common Goldeneye
45. Common Kingfisher (also called Eurasian Kingfisher and River Kingfisher)
46. Common Loon
47. Common Munia
48. Common Nightingale
49. Common Raven
50. Common Tern
51. Common Yellowthroat
52. Cooper's Hawk
53. Darked-eyed Junko (also called Slate-colored Junko)
54. Eastern Bluebird
55. Eastern Kingbird
56. Eastern Meadowlark
57. Eastern Starling
58. Eastern Towhee
59. Eastern Wild Turkey
60. European Goldfinch
61. Evening Grosbeak
62. Field Sparrow
63. Firefinch
64. Flamingo
65. Forster's Tern
66. Gadwall
67. Gambel's Quail
68. Glossy Ibis
69. Golden Eagle
70. Golden-crowned Kinglet
71. Goldeneye
72. Gray Catbird
73. Gray Partridge
74. Gray-cheeked Thrush
75. Great Blue Heron
76. Great Horned Owl
77. Greater Prairie Chicken
78. Greater Yellowlegs
79. Green Heron
80. Green-winged Teal
81. Grey Waxbill
82. Hooded Merganser
83. Hooded Warbler
84. Horned Grebe
85. Indian Peafowl
86. Indigo Bunting
87. Kentucky Warbler
88. Killdeer
89. Lady Amherst's Pheasant
90. Laughing Gull
91. Least Tern
92. Lesser Scaup
93. Little Blue Heron
94. Louisiana Water Thrush
95. Magpie
96. Mallard
97. Merriam Turkey
98. Mountain Bluebird
99. Mourning Dove
100. Northern Bobwhite (also called Bobwhite Quail and Virginia Quail)
101. Northern Cardinal
102. Northern Flicker (also called Yellow-shafted Flicker)
103. Northern Harrier
104. Northern Mockingbird
105. Northern Pintail
106. Northern Saw-whet Owl
107. Northern Shoveler
108. Orange-breasted Waxbill
109. Orange-cheeked Waxbill
110. Osprey
111. Painted Bunting
112. Peregrine Falcon
113. Pileated Woodpecker
114. Piping Plover
115. Purple Gallinule
116. Purple Martin
117. Red-cheeked Cordon-bleu Finch
118. Reddish Egret
119. Redhead
120. Red-headed Woodpecker
121. Red-tailed Hawk
122. Red-winged Blackbird
123. Reeves’ Pheasant
124. Ring-billed Gull
125. Ring-necked Duck
126. Ring-necked Pheasant
127. Rose-breasted Grosbeak
128. Ruby-crowned Kinglet
129. Ruby-throated Hummingbird
130. Ruddy Duck
131. Ruffed Grouse
132. Scarlet Tanager
133. Scoter
134. Screech Owl
135. Semipalmated Plover
136. Sharp-skinned Hawk
137. Sharp-tailed Grouse
138. Snow Goose
139. Snowy Egret
140. Song Sparrow
141. Spanish Red-legged Partridge
142. Spotted Sandpiper
143. Summer Tanager
144. Swallow-tailed Kite
145. Toucan
146. Tree Swallow
147. Tri-colored Mannikin
148. Troupial
149. Tufted Titmouse
150. Tundra Swan
151. Turkey Vulture
152. Turkish Gray Partridge
153. Two-colored Mannikin
154. Wayne Clapper Rail
155. Western Meadowlark
156. White Ibis
157. White-breasted Nuthatch
158. White-tailed Kite
159. White-throated Sparrow
160. Whooping Crane
161. Wilson's Snipe
162. Wood Duck
163. Wood Thrush
164. Yellow-billed Cuckoo
165. Yellow-breasted Chat
166. Yellow-naped Amazon Parrot
167. Zebra Finch

=== Decorative Arts Projects ===
1. 1927-1928 – Swan House (Atlanta, Georgia) - For Philip Shutze - First floor: marbleized areas in several rooms. Second floor: marbleized walls and decorative painting in the master dressing room/bath. It's now a house museum.

2. 1928 – Battle of Atlanta Cyclorama (Atlanta, Georgia) - For the City of Atlanta - Restored the sky and painted additional clouds.*

3. 1929 – Rhodes-Haverty Building (Atlanta, Georgia) - For J. J. Haverty - Decorative painting on the lobby ceiling.

4. 1930 – May Patterson Goodrum House (Atlanta, Georgia) - For Philip Shutze - First floor: marbleized areas in several rooms, decorative painting in the breakfast room, and decorative painting on the ceiling and frieze in the dining room. It's now a house museum.

5. 1930 – Saint Joseph's Hospital (Atlanta, Georgia) - For J. J. Haverty - Two chapel murals.

6. 1931 – The Temple (Atlanta, Georgia) - For Philip Shutze - Marbleized wood columns in the sanctuary's altar area.

7. 1931 – Al Sihah Shrine Temple (Macon, Georgia) - For William Elliott Dunwoody Jr. - Main hall murals and decorative painting.

8. 1933 – The Citizens and Southern National Bank (Macon, Georgia) - For William Elliott Dunwoody Jr. - Five banking room murals.

9. 1934 – English Avenue School (Atlanta, Georgia) - For J. J. Haverty (WPA Project) - A library mural.*

10. 1936-1938 – R. J. Reynolds Mansion (Sapelo Island, Georgia) - For Philip Shutze - Ground floor: game room murals. First floor: sunroom mural, indoor pool mural.* Second floor: banquet hall murals.

11. 1939 – Capital City Club (Atlanta, Georgia) - For Philip Shutze - Fifteen large paintings (painted in reverse) on glass and then silvered to create mirrors.

12. 1940 – New York World's Fair (Queens, New York) - For the “America at Home” Building/Exhibit (April to October 1940) - An overmantel mural used to decorate a room by Atlanta interior designer Mary Miller.*

Notes:

1. * The work no longer exists.
2. Menaboni began selling paintings of birds in 1937, but was, in the 1950s, commissioned to create murals by The Citizens and Southern National Bank for branches in Atlanta, Decatur, and Albany, Georgia.

=== Magazines ===
Menaboni's art has been featured on the covers of many prominent magazines, such as Sports Afield, Sports Illustrated (2 covers), The Progressive Farmer (15 covers) and Southern Living. These engagements led to other jobs for the artist.

A 1950 TIME article referred to Menaboni as "Audubon's Heir".

=== Books ===
In 1950 Sara and Athos Menaboni published Menaboni’s Birds, a book of his paintings with accompanying descriptions written by Sara. It was named one of the “Fifty Best Books of the Year” by the American Institute of Graphic Arts. A revised edition was published in 1984.

Menaboni illustrated Never the Nightingale (1951) by Daniel Whitehead Hicky. Since 1957 his art has appeared in every edition of The World Book Encyclopedia (Volume B, “Birds”).

== Exhibitions and tributes ==
Menaboni's work received exhibitions at institutions such as the American Museum of Natural History and the National Audubon Society. His collaboration with Robert W. Woodruff of The Coca-Cola Company helped solidified his reputation, with bird paintings featured on his annual personal Christmas cards for over four decades.

Don Russell Clayton, an alumnus of Kennesaw State University and a friend of Menaboni, donated his collection of Menaboni's works to KSU's Zuckerman Museum of Art and has presented multiple lectures on the artist. He has also curated numerous exhibitions.

The Athos Menaboni Gallery opened at Kennesaw State University in 2026 as a permanent venue for Menaboni's art.
