= Brunswick High School (Georgia) =

Public high school in Brunswick, Georgia, United States

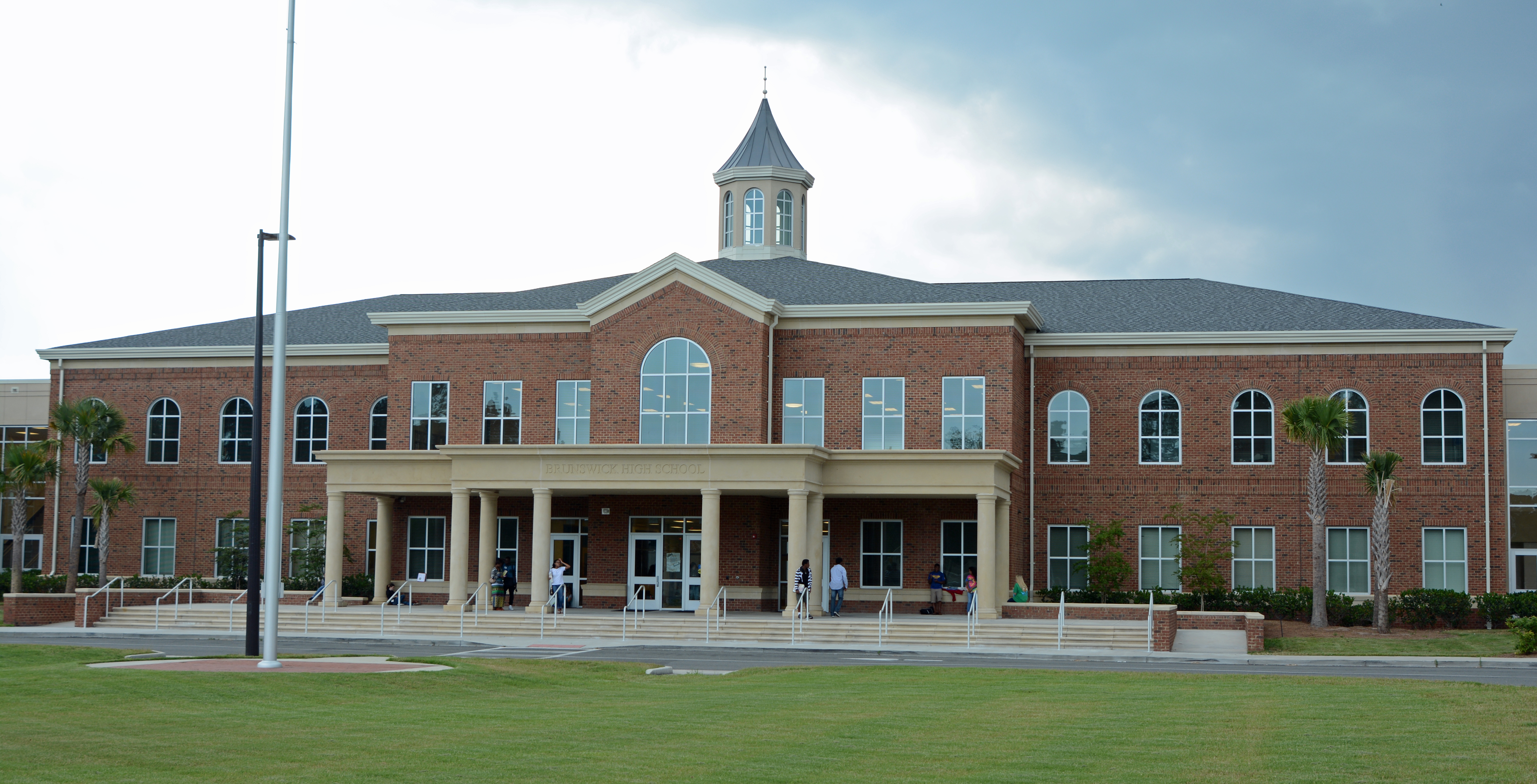
- Brunswick High School in 2015

Location
- 3885 Altama Avenue; Brunswick, Georgia 31523; United States; 30.82364°N 81.65209°W

Information
- School type: Public high school
- Founded: 1967
- School district: Glynn County School District
- Principal: Slade Turner
- Teaching staff: 117.40 (FTE)
- Grades: 9–12
- Enrollment: 1,939 (2023–2024)
- Student to teacher ratio: 16.52
- Language: English
- Colors: Blue and gold
- Mascot: Pirate
- Rival: Glynn Academy
- Website: bhs.glynn.k12.ga.us

Brunswick High School is a public high school located in Brunswick in Glynn County, Georgia, United States. It is part of the Glynn County School District and opened in 1967. In January 2014, Brunswick High School opened a new facility on 3885 Altama Avenue, becoming one of the largest new schools in the state.

The school serves sections of Brunswick, Everett, and Sterling. It also serves sections of Country Club Estates and Dock Junction.

== Sports ==
=== State Titles ===
- Boys' Basketball (1) - 2015(5A)

== Notable alumni ==
- Ahmaud Arbery, murder victim
- Justin Coleman, NFL cornerback who is currently a free agent
- Anna Jernigan, professional wrestler known as Anna Jay
- ReShard Lee, former NFL running back
- Raymond M. Lloyd, professional wrestler known as Glacier
- Kenny Mainor, former CFL defensive lineman
- Warren McClendon, NFL offensive tackle for the Los Angeles Rams
- Darius Slay, NFL cornerback for the Pittsburgh Steelers
- Tracy Walker, former NFL safety for the Detroit Lions

== See also ==
- Glynn Academy
