= James L. Hardaway House =

Historic house in Georgia, United States

- U.S. National Register of Historic Places
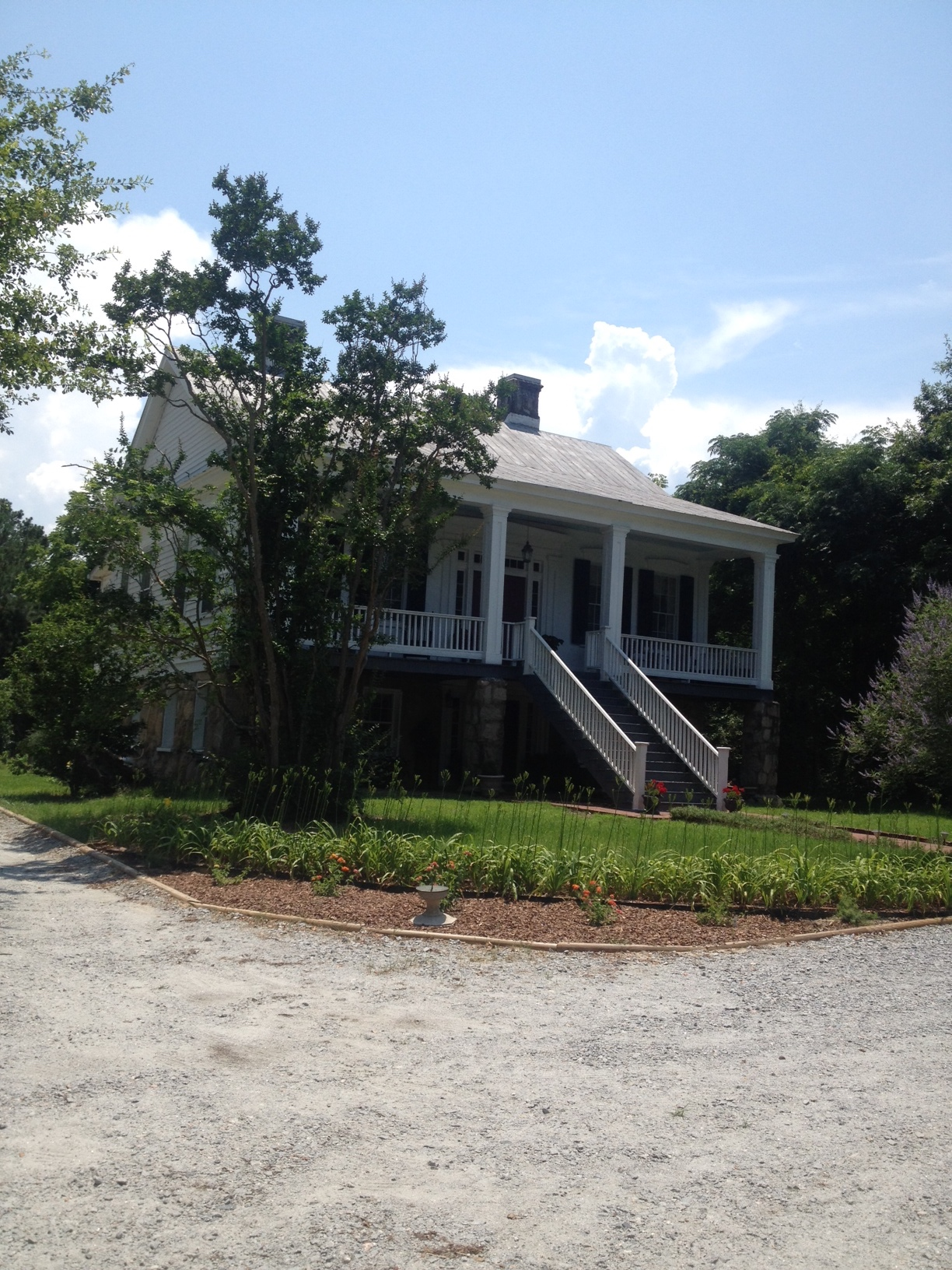

- Location within Georgia Location within the United States
- Nearest city: Thomson, Georgia
- Coordinates: 33°26′53″N 82°34′41″W
- Area: 5 acres (2.0 ha)
- Built: 1842
- Architectural style: Greek Revival
- NRHP reference No.: 93000942
- Added to NRHP: September 16, 1993

The James L. Hardaway House is a historic home in Thomson, Georgia. It was built in the Greek Revival style by George Washington Hardaway in 1842. who sold it to his youngest son James Lafayette Hardaway for $10 upon his twenty-first birthday. It was built to face the tracks of the Georgia Railroad.

The house is a classic sand hills raised cottage with a four-over-four floor plan. The ground floor is constructed of weathered granite. The second floor is southern modified braced beam construction. The ground floor ceilings are 8 feet tall while the second story is 12 feet tall. All ceilings are wood except the room with faux marble walls which has a plaster ceiling. The second floor has extensive moulding around all windows and doors. All architectural details except the rear addition are original. Of major interest are the pediments over the front façade windows and side lights on the second story.

The home has had only four owners since leaving the Hardaway family in 1896.

The home is on the National Register of Historic Places.
