= Sara Goodrum =

Major League Baseball executive

- Education: University of Oregon
- Occupation: Director of Special Projects Miami Marlins

Sara Goodrum is the current Director of Special Projects for the Miami Marlins and the former Director of Player Development for the Houston Astros. She is the first woman to hold the position of minor league hitting coordinator for a Major League Baseball team the position she held prior for the Milwaukee Brewers. She is also the first woman to hold the position of Farm Director for a Major League Baseball team.

== Playing career ==
Goodrum played softball for the University of Oregon from 2012–15, during which the Ducks appeared in the Women's College World Series three times. She played in the outfield, appearing in 33 games in 2014, her junior year, when she was also named to the Academic All-Pac-12 Second Team.

Sara's accomplishments earned her an induction into the City of Mesa Sports Hall of Fame in November 2024.

== Coaching career ==
While at Oregon, Goodrum worked as an undergraduate research assistant at the Bowerman Sports Science Clinic. After graduating with a degree in human physiology, she earned a master's degree in exercise and sports science from the University of Utah.

=== Milwaukee Brewers ===
Goodrum started with the Milwaukee Brewers as an intern in April 2017. She also worked as coordinator for integrative sports performance before being promoted in October 2020 to being the Minor League hitting coordinator, which the team announced in January 2021. As hitting coordinator, she oversees the hitting curriculum and programming for all players in the Brewers' minor league system and manages the organization's minor league hitting coaches.

=== Houston Astros ===
On December 1, 2021, the Houston Astros hired Goodrum to serve as their director of player development. Goodrum and the Astros organization parted ways on October 9, 2023.

=== Miami Marlins ===
On February 9, 2024, the Miami Marlins hired Goodrum to serve as their Director of Special Projects.

== Personal ==
Goodrum is from Mesa, Arizona.

She is an avid dog lover. Her husband and she own 2 rescued pitbulls.
