= Glynn County School District =

School district in Georgia (U.S. state)

Address
- 1313 Egmont Street Brunswick, Georgia, 31520-7244; United States
- Coordinates: 31.147501°N 81.491029°W

District information
- Grades: Pre-kindergarten – 12
- Superintendent: Mike Blackerby
- Accreditations: Southern Association of Colleges and Schools; Georgia Accrediting Commission

Students and staff
- Enrollment: 12,844 (2022–23)
- Faculty: 949.00 (FTE)
- Student–teacher ratio: 13.53

Other information
- Telephone: (912) 267-4100
- Website: glynn.k12.ga.us

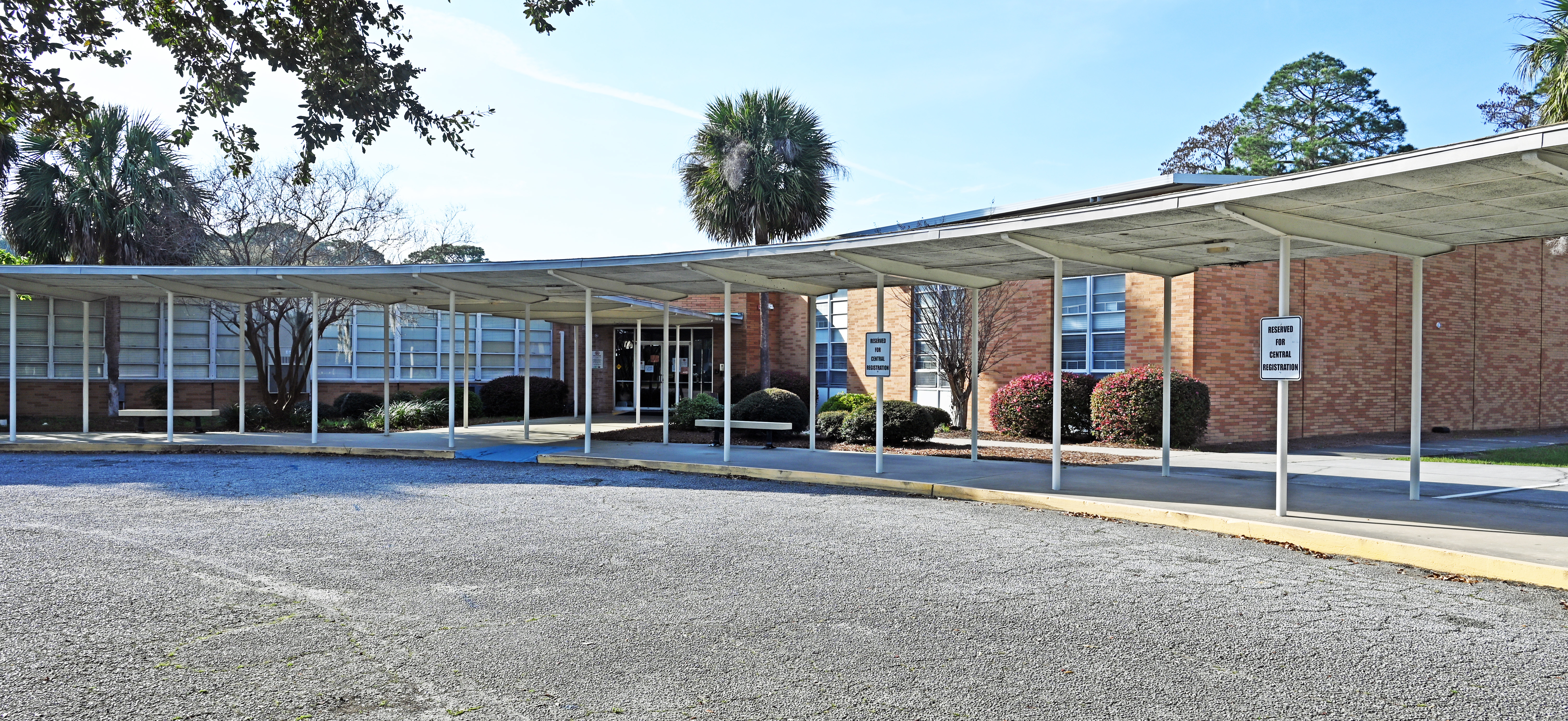
Glynn County School District headquarters in 2023

The Glynn County School District is a public school district in Glynn County, Georgia, United States, based in Brunswick. It serves the communities of Brunswick, Country Club Estates, Dock Junction, Everett, St. Simons Island, and Sterling.

== History ==
By 1963 the board of education had ruled that African-American students should attend high schools which previously did not admit children of their race.

In 1999 the school district voted to find a method of having the Ten Commandments legally displayed on district properties which would hold up under legal challenges; the proposal had displaying the Ten Commandments with other historical documents.

In 2025, under the "Distraction-Free Education Act" in Georgia, Glynn County Schools banned cellphones and other electronics during school hours for K-12 students.

== Board of education ==
(GSBA) 2018 Distinguished School Board

Name	Position
Eaddy Sams	Chair
Vacant	Board Member
Marcus Edgy	Board Member
Mike Hulsey	Board Member
John Madala	Board Member
Jerry Mancil	Board Member
Dr. Hank Yeargan	Vice Chair
Mike Blackerby	Superintendent

== Schools ==
The Glynn County School District has ten elementary schools, four middle schools, and two high schools.

=== Elementary schools ===
- Altama Elementary School
- Burroughs-Molette Elementary School
- Glyndale Elementary School
- Golden Isles Elementary School
- Goodyear Elementary School
- C.B. Greer Elementary School
- Oglethorpe Point Elementary School
- Satilla Marsh Elementary School
- St. Simons Elementary School
- Sterling Elementary School
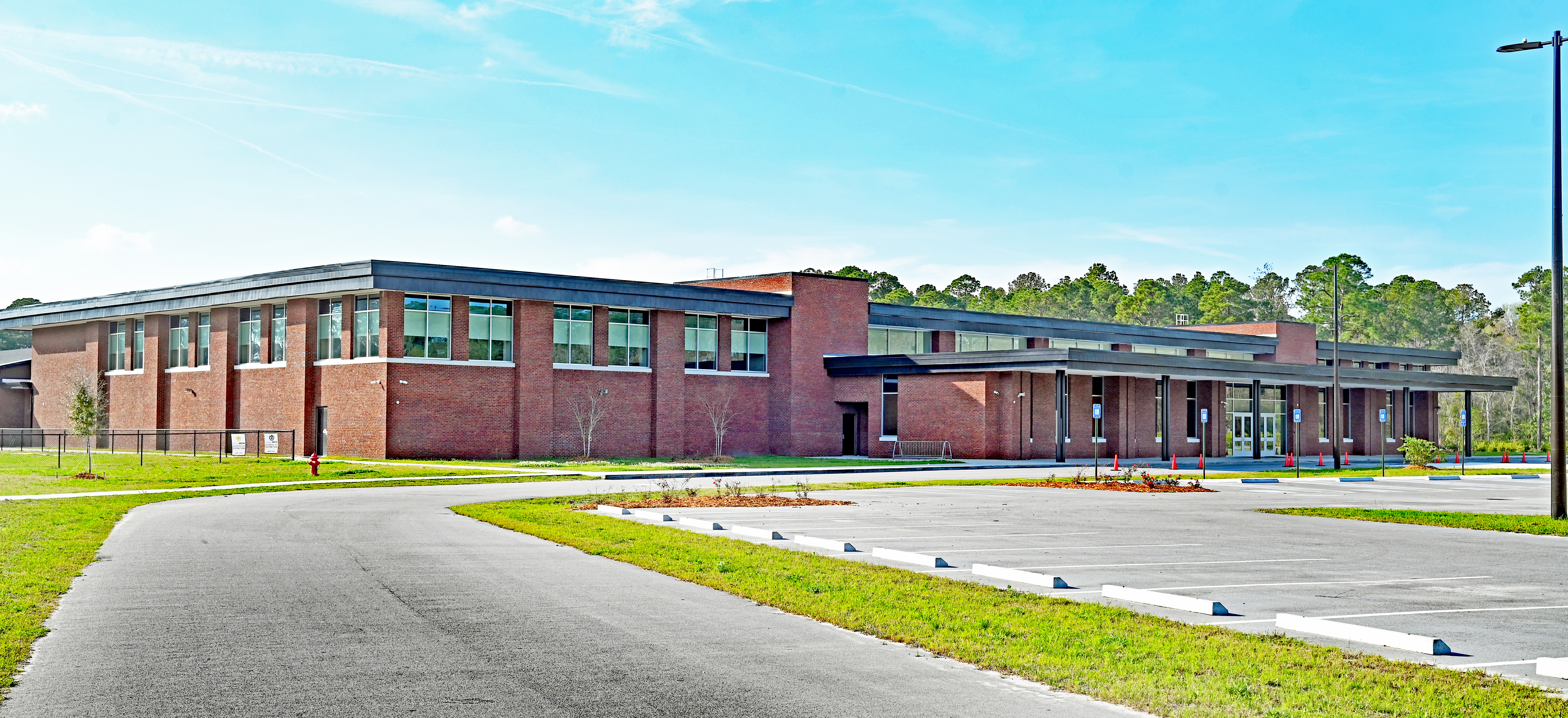
Altama Elementary School

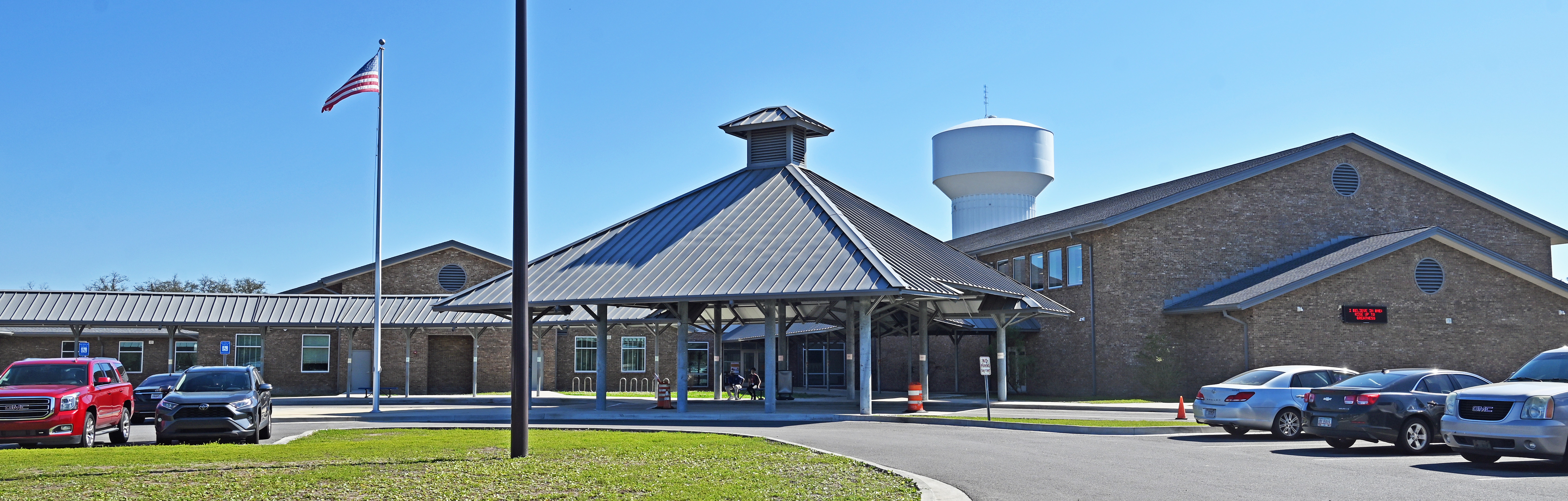
Burroughs-Molette Elementary School

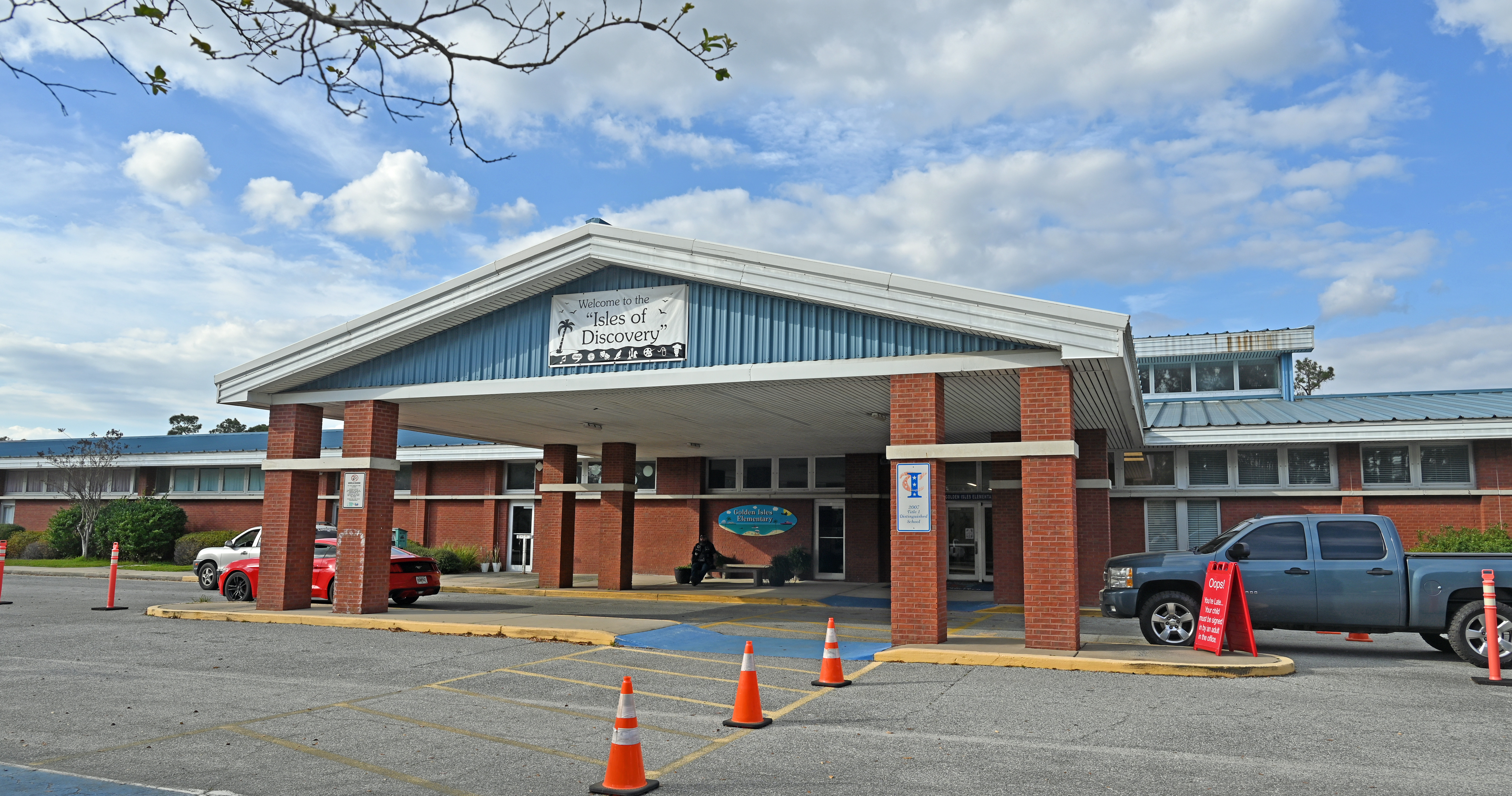
Golden Isles Elementary School

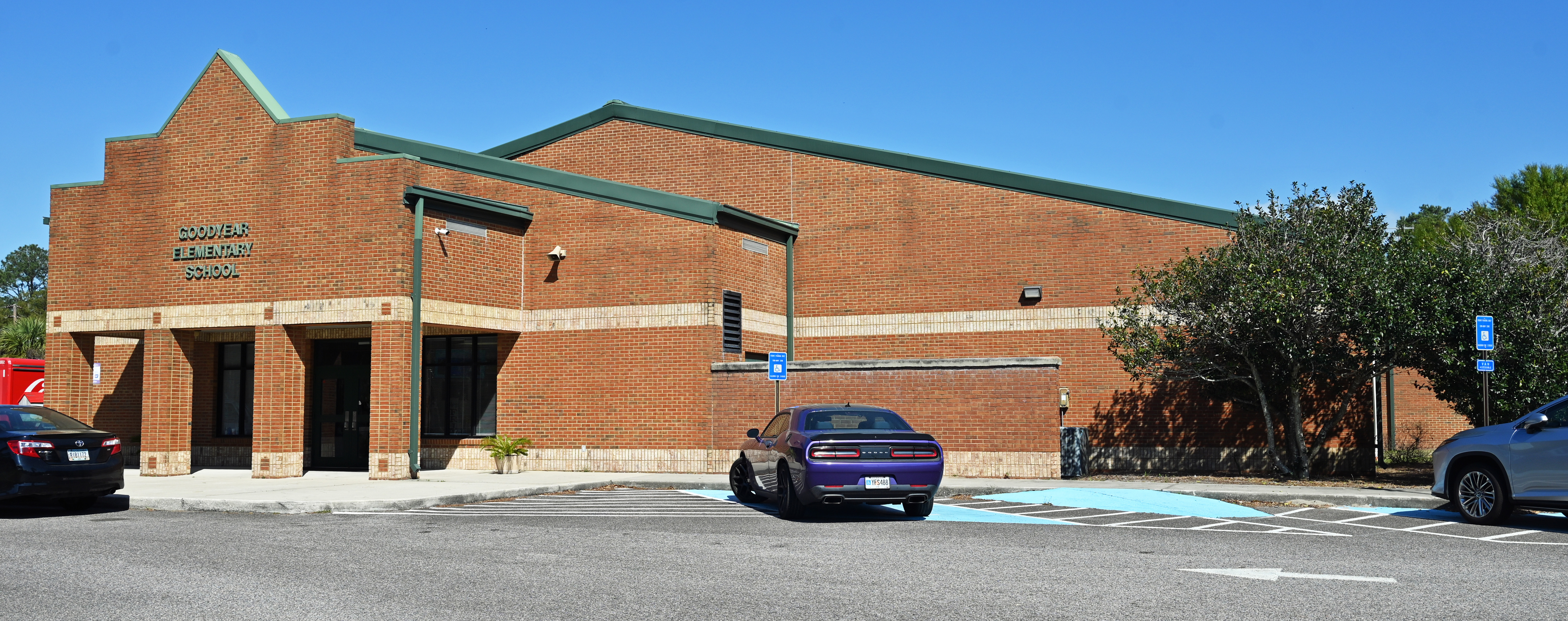
Goodyear Elementary School

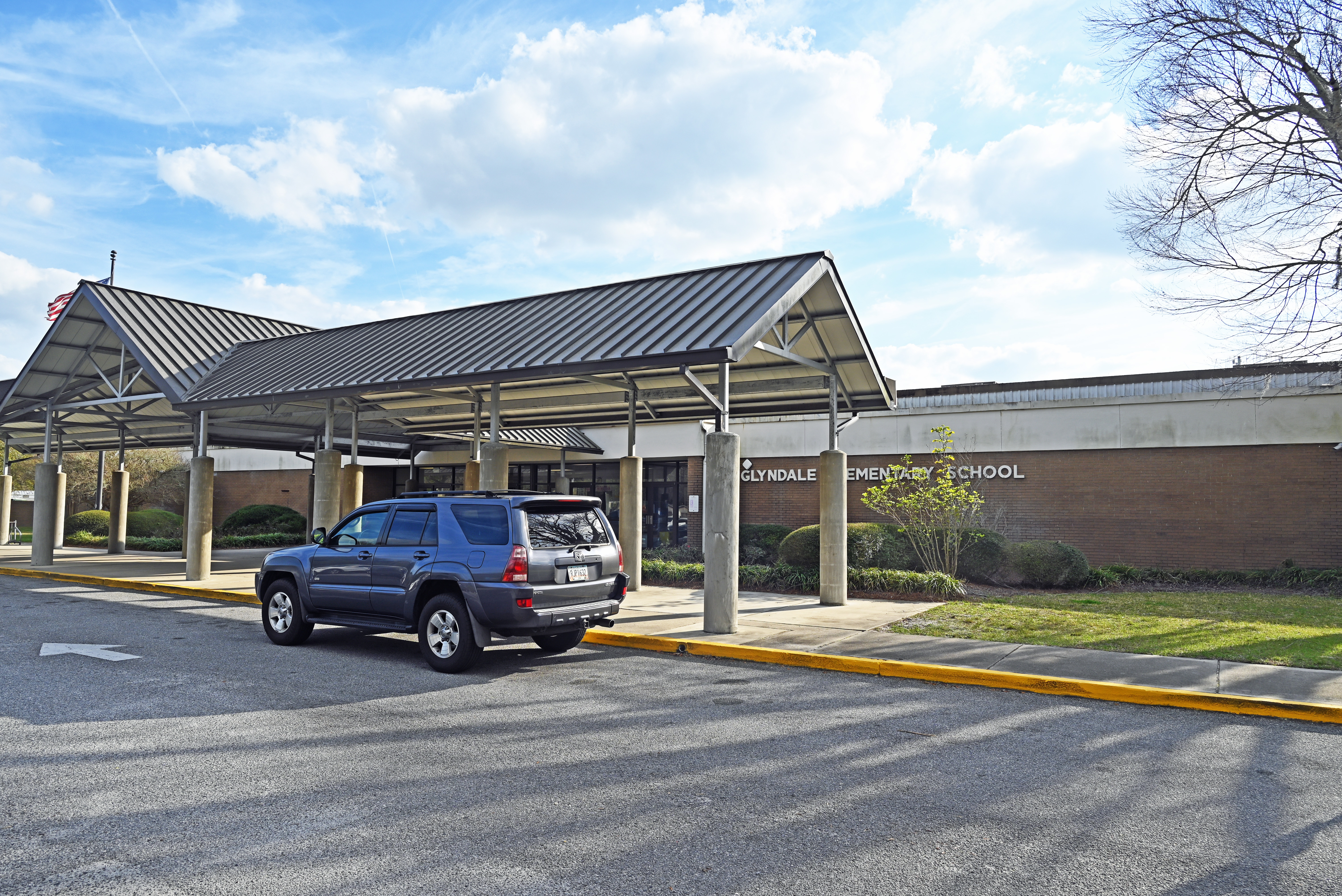
Glyndale Elementary School

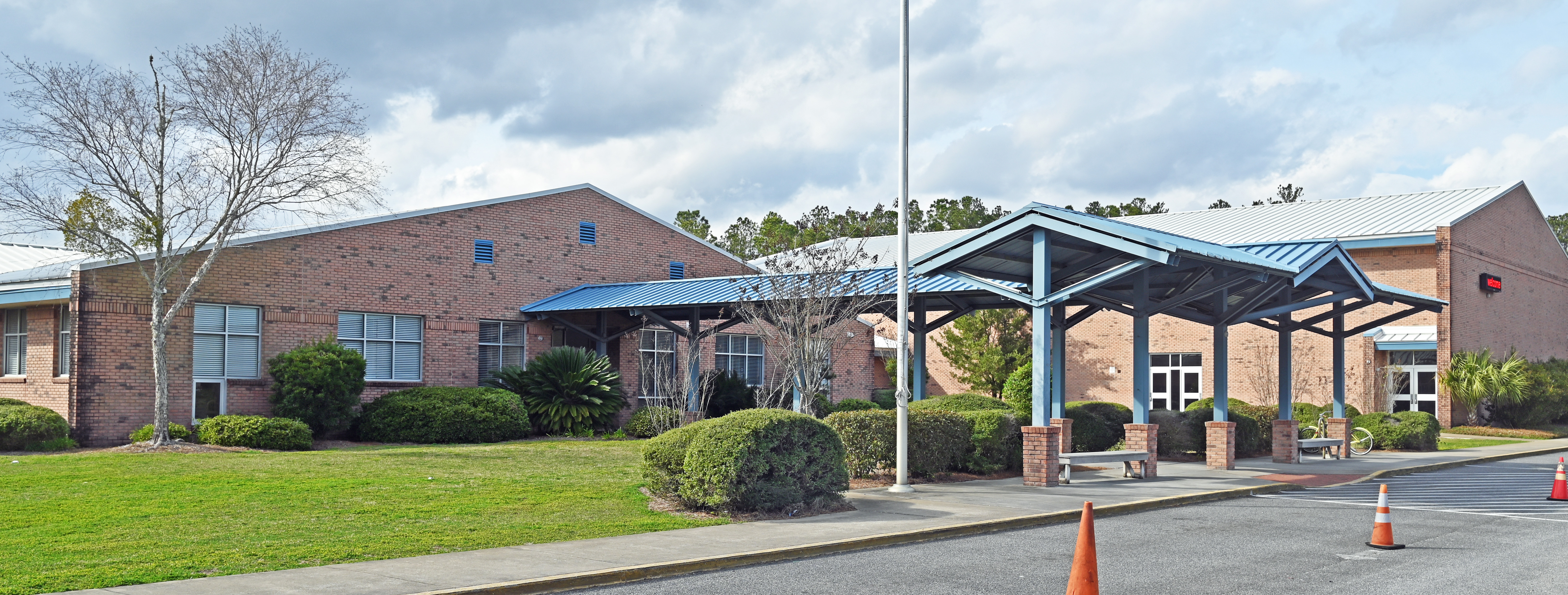
C.B. Greer Elementary School

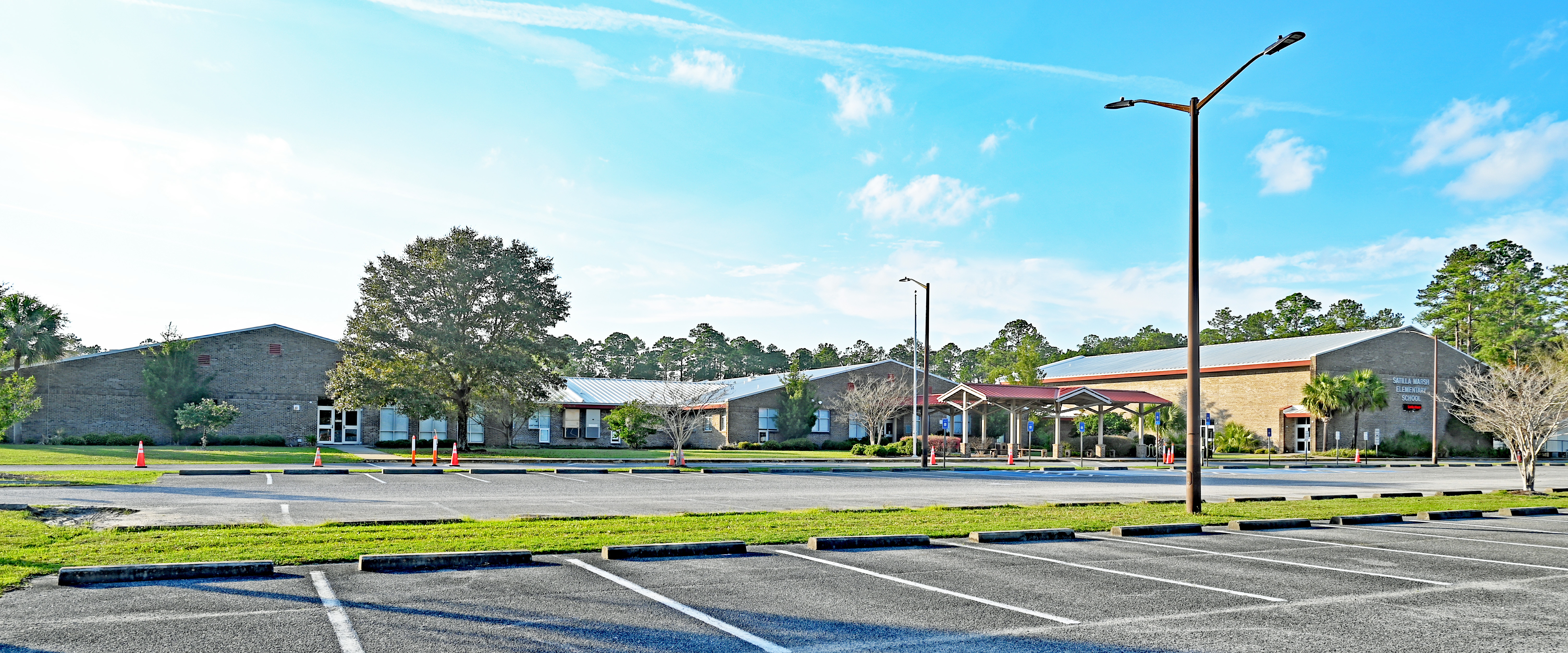
Satilla Marsh Elementary School

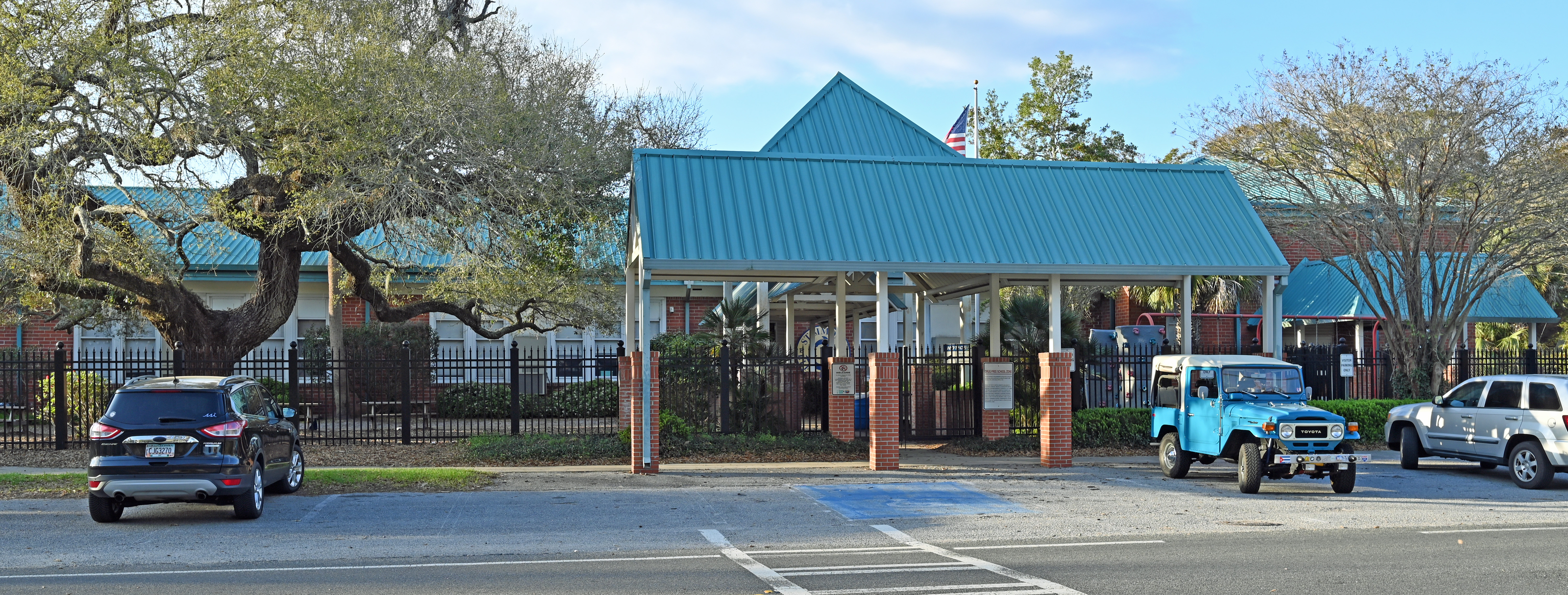
St. Simons Elementary School

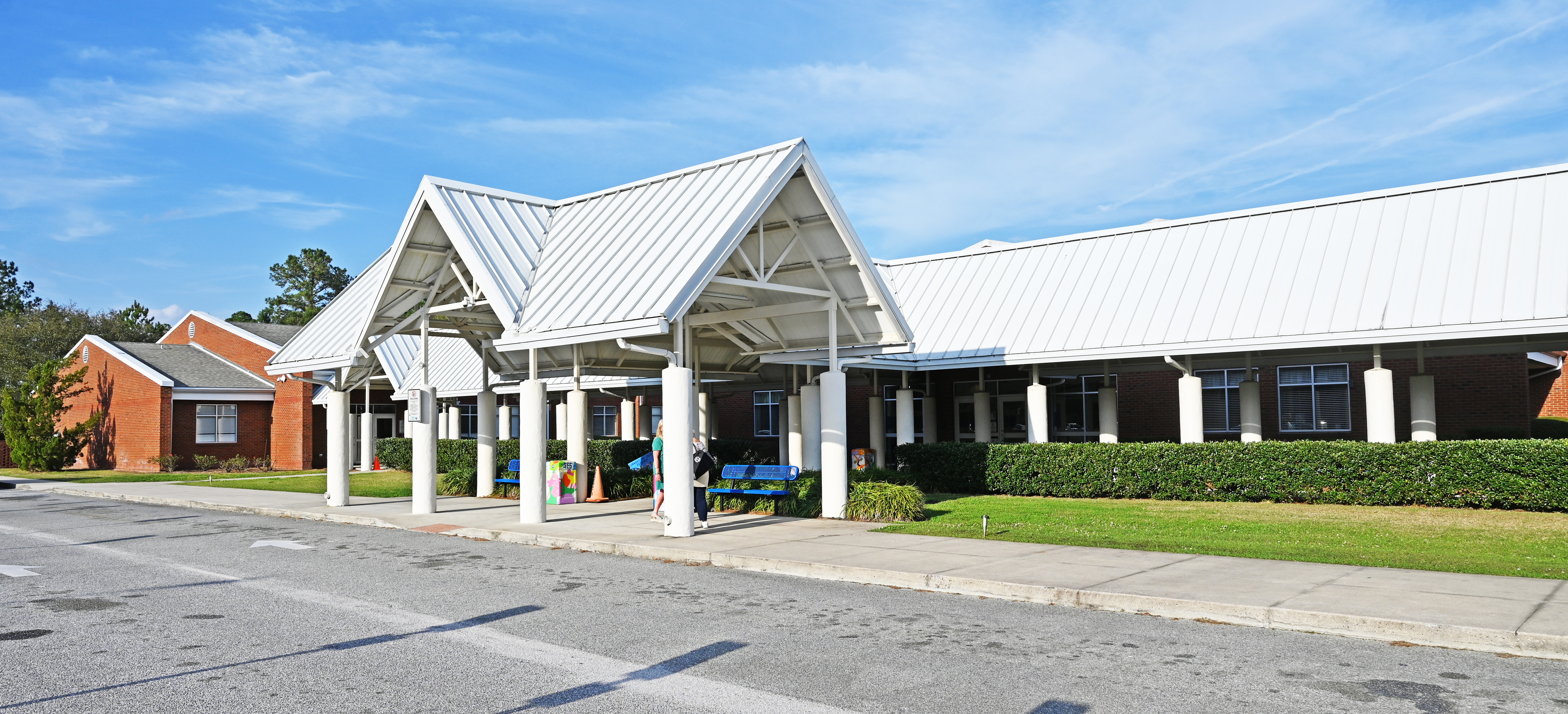
Sterling Elementary School

=== Middle schools ===
- Glynn Middle School
- Jane Macon Middle School
- Needwood Middle School
- Risley Middle School
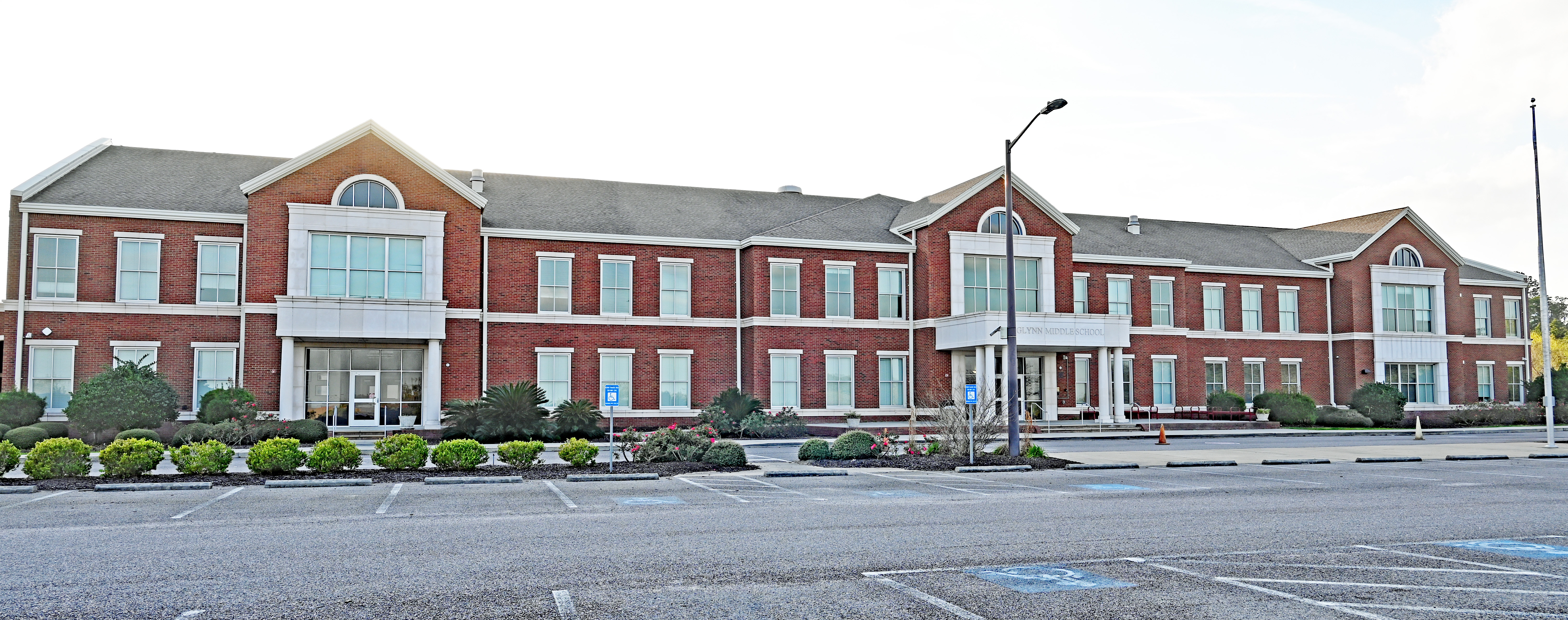
Glynn Middle School

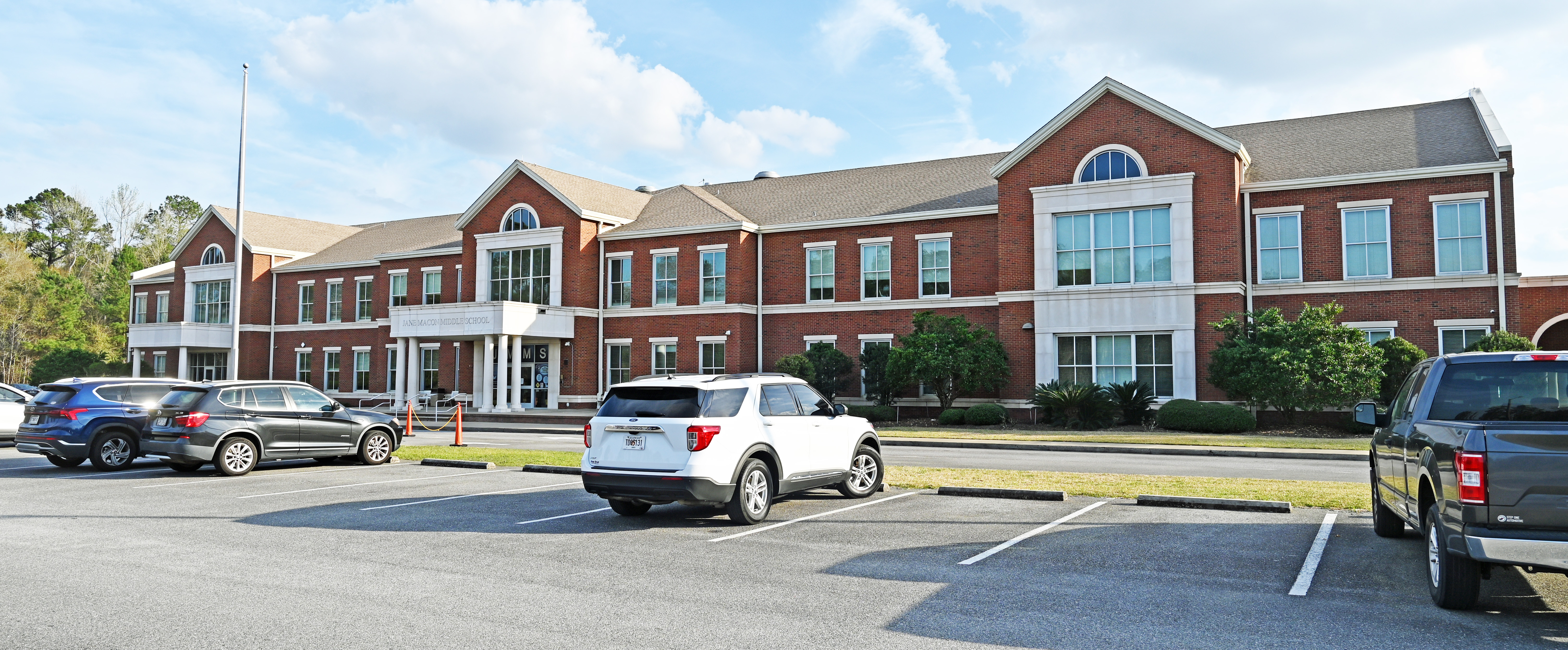
Jane Macon Middle School

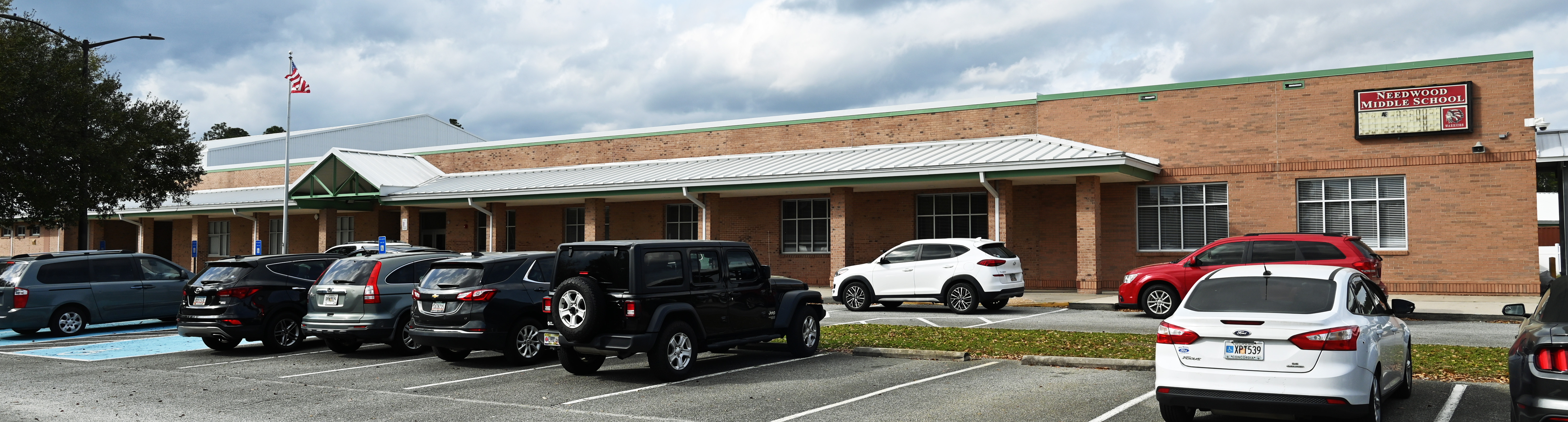
Needwood Middle School

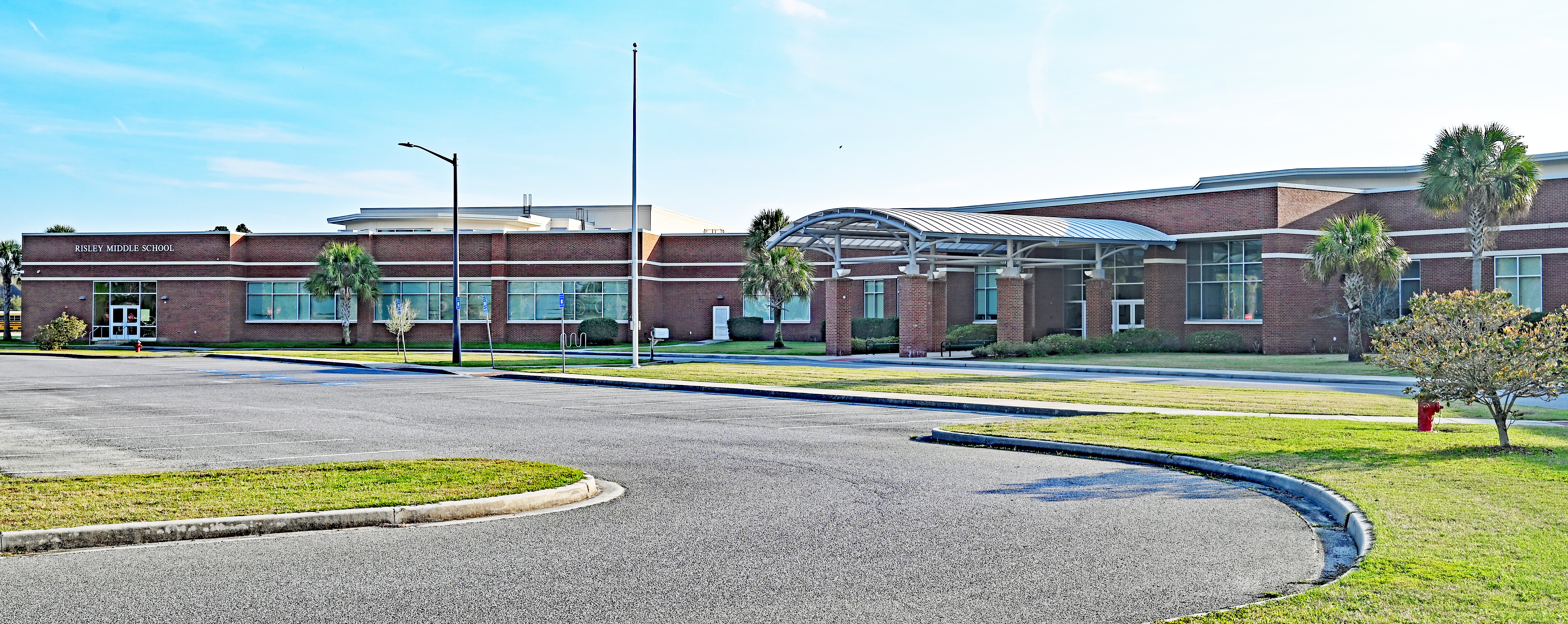
Risley Middle School

=== High schools ===
- Brunswick High School
- Glynn Academy
