= May Patterson Goodrum House =

Historic house in Georgia, United States

- U.S. National Register of Historic Places
- Location within Georgia Location within the United States
- Location: 320 West Paces Ferry Road N.W., Atlanta, Georgia
- Coordinates: 33.843865°N 84.396114°W.
- Built: 1932
- Architect: Philip Trammell Shutze
- Architectural style: English Regency
- NRHP reference No.: 13000215
- Added to NRHP: May 1, 2013

The May Patterson Goodrum House is a historic home in the Buckhead neighborhood of Atlanta, Georgia completed in 1932. It is also known as the Peacock House. It is an English Regency style mansion designed by Atlanta architect Philip T. Shutze and is considered one of his "finest works." It was entered into the National Register of Historic Places on May 1, 2013.

== Design ==
The house is a large English Regency style mansion with a 2 1/2-story central block flanked by two-story wings which project forward. The exterior is constructed of brick, and covered with smooth stucco scored in a way to look like stone. The entryway features ionic columns. The rear of the house faces a semicircular terrace and features two-story bow windows.

Decorations inside the house include murals by Allyn Cox and Athos Menaboni as well as carvings and plasterwork by Herbert J. Millard. Several features of the house including the murals in the dining room and the balustrade in the central hall incorporate chinoiserie design elements.

The Architectural League of New York gave the house an honorable mention award in 1932. The house was covered in national magazines of the time including Architecture, House & Garden and Town & Country.

== History ==
May E. Patterson (1891–1976) was a native of Atlanta, whose father was a stonecutter and contractor. She worked as a clerk at various retail establishments. James J. Goodrum Jr. (1879–1928) was a native of Newnan, Georgia who had founded a chain of retail stores at age 27 and then sold it a few years later to American Tobacco Company. He then pursued an investment career with Trust Company of Georgia at which he was very successful. He managed the $25 million IPO of The Coca-Cola Company in 1919. Patterson and Goodrum married in New York City in 1926, but Goodrum died in 1928.

After her husband's death, Mrs. Goodrum bought two tracts of land on West Paces Ferry Road between Habersham and Arden roads. She hired architect Philip Trammell Shutze to design a house and gardens for the property. By August 1929 he had completed designs for the house. Goodrum was living in the house by September 1930 but it wasn't fully completed until 1932. Some elements of the gardens weren't completed until 1936.

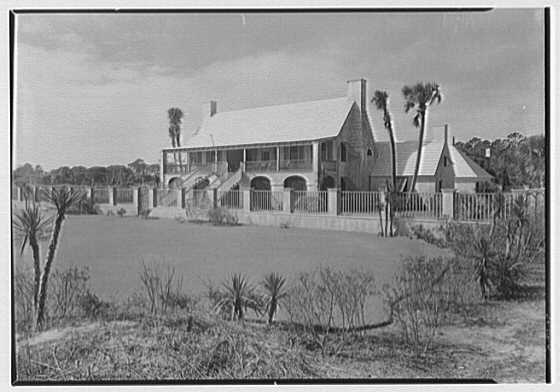
The Abreus retired to South Wind (pictured) at Sea Island, Georgia in 1958

In 1938 May Goodrum married architect Francis L. Abreu (1896–1969). The couple were active in Atlanta society and supported numerous charitable causes including American Red Cross and the Atlanta Humane Society. In 1944 May was named the first "Atlanta's Woman of the Year" for her charitable work. In 1958 the Abreus sold the house and retired to Sea Island, Georgia where they lived in a beach house named South Wind, also designed by Shutze.

The Abreus sold the Atlanta house to Mary Phillips Rushton (1896–1984) founder of a toy company. Rushton made a few modifications to the house including kitchen changes and adding an elevator. Rushton also kept peacocks on the property, and so the house became known as the Peacock House. The birds sometimes annoyed the motorists passing on West Paces Ferry Road. When Rushton died in 1984, the property was sold to Jerry Cates, who subdivided and sold off part of the property, removing some parts of the wall and elements of the gardens.

In April and May 1984 the house was opened to the public as the "Decorator's Show House" as a fundraiser for the Atlanta Symphony Orchestra. It has also hosted the 26th annual Preservation Gala for Georgia Trust for Historic Preservation in 2010.

Later in 1984 the home was purchased by the Southern Center for International Studies for $1.5 million and it served as the group's headquarters from November of that year to 2009. Modifications to the property during this time included some fire escapes added to the second floor, and parking areas which eliminated further elements of the garden. During this period the property was also available as a wedding venue.

The home was purchased in 2009 for $3.5 million by the Watson-Brown Foundation, which restored it. The home is operated as a historic house museum with a full-time curator, and is only available to visit by appointment. The same foundation also operates other house museums in Georgia including Hickory Hill in Thomson and the T. R. R. Cobb House in Athens.

== See also ==
- National Register of Historic Places listings in Fulton County, Georgia
