= Glynn Academy =

Location
- 1001 Mansfield Street; Brunswick, Georgia 31520; United States; 31°08′50″N 81°29′24″W
- Glynn Academy
- U.S. National Register of Historic Places
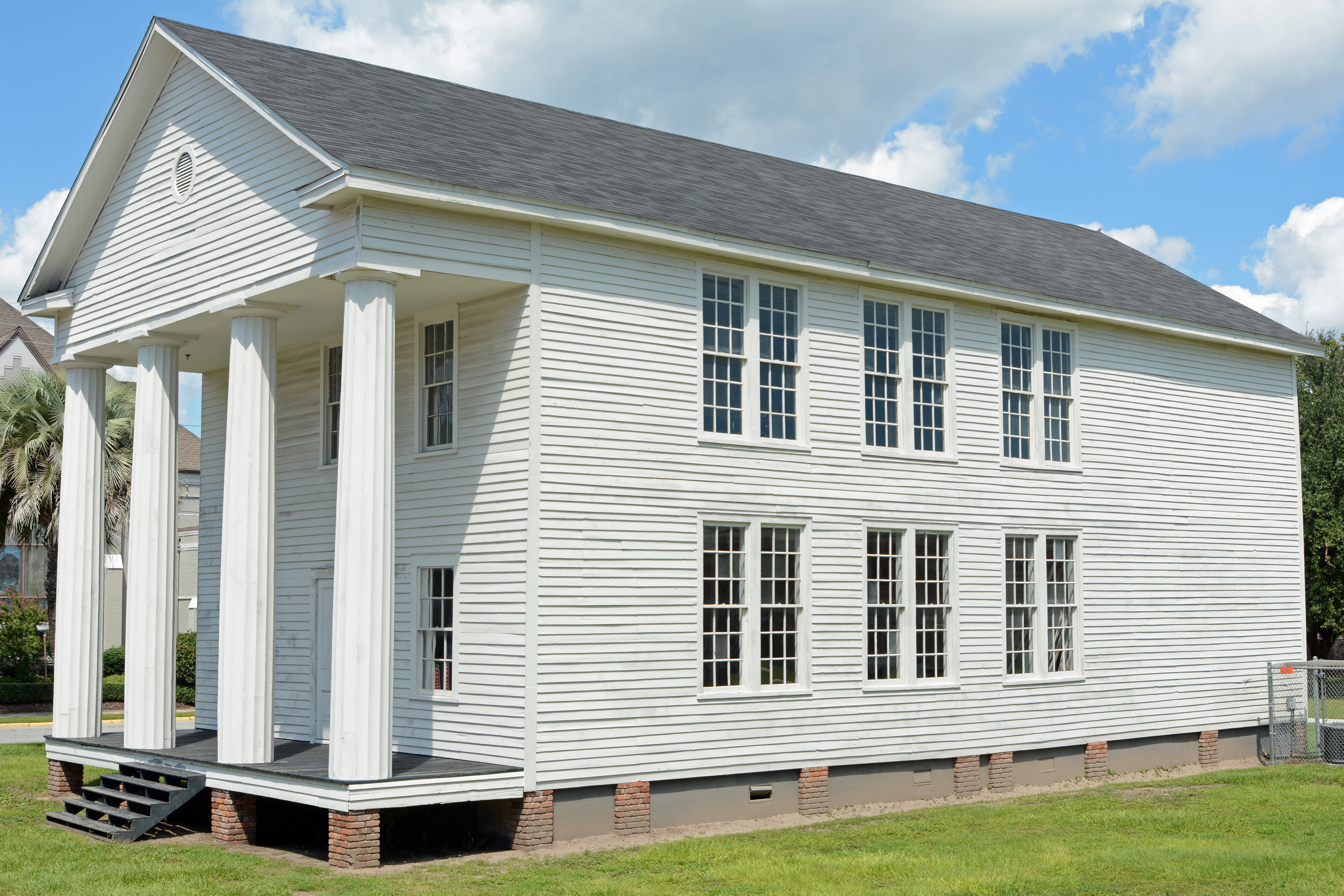
- The 1840 building
- Location: Corner of Monck and Norwich Streets, Brunswick, GA
- Coordinates: 31.14864°N 81.49062°W
- Built: 1840
- Architectural style: Greek Revival
- NRHP reference No.: 11000775
- Added to NRHP: November 2, 2011

Information
- Type: Public
- Founded: 1788
- School board: Glynn County Board of Education
- School district: Glynn County School District
- Superintendent: Scott Spence
- Principal: Matthew Blackstone
- Teaching staff: 109.40 (FTE)
- Grades: 9–12
- Enrollment: 1,820 (2023-2024)
- Student to teacher ratio: 16.64
- Language: English
- Campus: Urban
- Colors: Red and White
- Athletics: GHSA 1-AAAAA
- Mascot: Red Terrors
- Rival: Brunswick High School
- Yearbook: High Tide
- Website: Glynn Academy
