= 1972 Sidney Lanier Bridge collapse =

Ship collision in Brunswick, Georgia, US

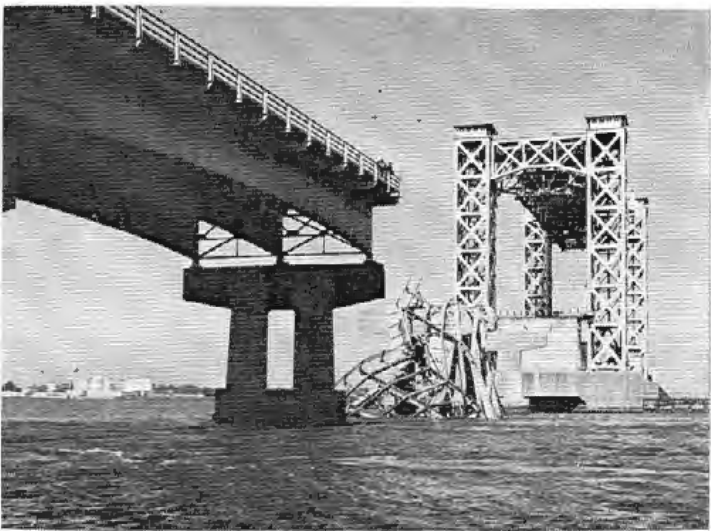
- View of the collapsed sections, facing north
- Date: November 7, 1972
- Time: 9:50 p.m. (EST)
- Location: Sidney Lanier Bridge, Brunswick, Georgia, United States; 31°6′59″N 81°29′10″W
- Type: Bridge collapse due to a bridge strike
- Cause: Ship collision
- Deaths: 10
- Injuries: 11
- Property damage: Repairs to the bridge took six months and cost $1.3 million (equivalent to $10 million in 2025)

On November 7, 1972, at 9:50 p.m. EST, three sections of the Sidney Lanier Bridge across the Brunswick River in Brunswick, Georgia, United States, collapsed after a cargo ship, the SS African Neptune, struck the bridge. The collapse affected roughly 450 feet (140 m) of the bridge and caused 24 people and ten motor vehicles to fall into the river. Ten people died and eleven others sustained injuries.

The Sidney Lanier Bridge was a vertical-lift bridge which was notorious among seamen for being difficult to navigate, due in part to its small opening. On the night of November 7, 1972, as the African Neptune was leaving the Port of Brunswick, it failed to properly align with the opening and impacted the bridge roughly 250 ft (80 m) south of the vertical-lift section. Later investigations by the United States Coast Guard and the National Transportation Safety Board concluded that the misalignment had been caused by the helmsman, who had incorrectly entered in rudder directions given by the pilot. The helmsman's mistakes were noticed by a mate aboard the ship, but not before the vessel had reached a point on the river where a full stop was impossible. Following the impact, the ship's crew deployed lifebuoys and rescue ships, and emergency responders from around the area began search and rescue efforts that continued into the next day.

In total, the bridge was closed for repairs for six months, at a cost of $1.3 million (equivalent to $10 million in 2025). Following the incident, safety measures were put in place to prevent automobiles from being present on the bridge any time the vertical-lift span was open. In 1987, another cargo ship struck the bridge, resulting in several million dollars of damages, but no injuries or fatalities. Following this second incident, the Coast Guard declared the bridge a navigational hazard. In 2003, it was replaced by a cable-stayed bridge that features improved bridge protection systems.

== Background ==
=== Sidney Lanier Bridge ===
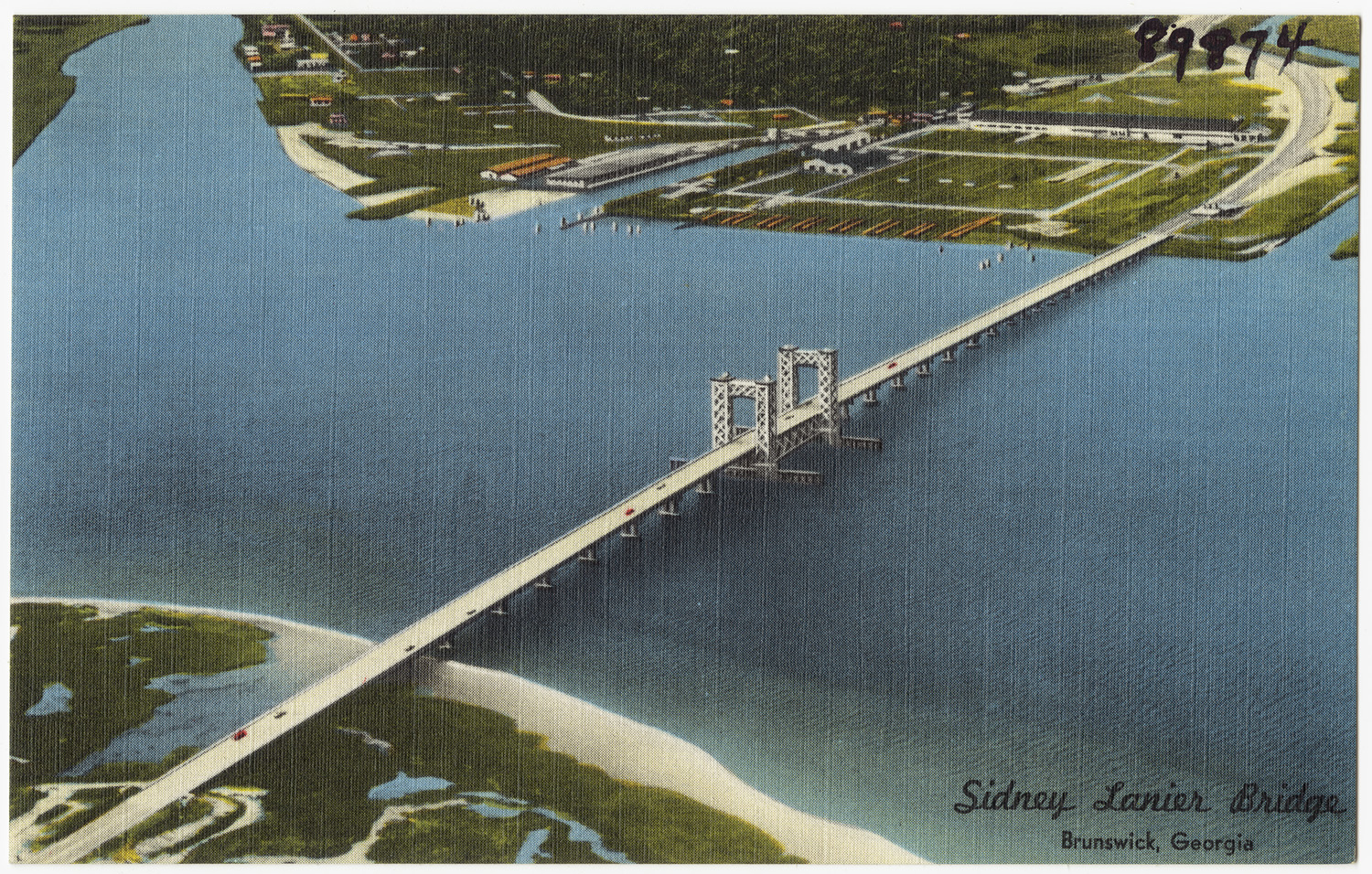
The Sidney Lanier Bridge was a vertical-lift bridge that spanned the Brunswick River in Georgia.

The Sidney Lanier Bridge was a 1-mile (1.6 km) long, four-lane automobile bridge that spanned the Brunswick River, a tidal river, in Brunswick, Georgia. Construction on the bridge was completed in 1956. Situated roughly 1.5 mi (2.4 km) south of downtown Brunswick, it carried U.S. Route 17, a major north–south thoroughfare for both the eastern portion of Glynn County and the East Coast of the United States at large. While the main portion of the bridge stood only about 50 feet (15 m) to 80 ft (24 m) above the surface of the river, it featured a vertical-lift section to allow for larger oceangoing ships to access the Port of Brunswick. The bridge had a reputation among seamen for being difficult to traverse, as its 250-foot (80 m) opening meant that large ships with wide turning radii had to begin aligning themselves with the passageway well in advance of reaching the bridge. A 2012 article in The Brunswick News described the bridge's passageway as being "small" and "dangerous" for large ships to pass through.

=== SS African Neptune ===
The SS African Neptune was a cargo ship owned by the Farrell Lines company of New York City. The ship measured approximately 350 ft (110 m) long and weighed roughly 11,000 short tons. At around 11 p.m. EST on November 6, 1972, the ship arrived at the opening of the channel leading to the port, but because of the bridge's reputation, Frank Stanejko, the sea captain of the African Neptune, decided to wait until the next morning to begin the 15 mi (24 km) journey from the Atlantic Ocean to the docks. The ship collected its cargo, resin bound for Kenya, at the State Docks on Oglethorpe Bay, a small tidal river that combined with the Turtle River to form the Brunswick River approximately 400 yards (400 m) upstream of the bridge.

== Collapse ==
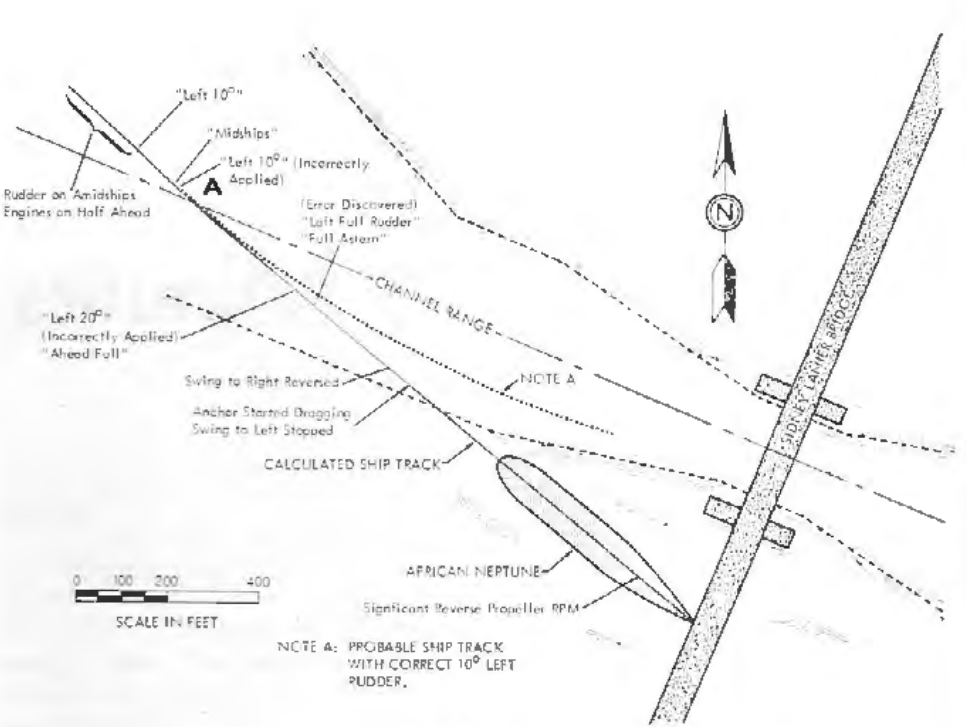
Illustration prepared by the National Transportation Safety Board showing the approximate path of the ship

Due to heavy rain, the ship was not cleared to leave the port until 9:36 p.m. on November 7, a Tuesday night, during a period of high tide. In the wheelhouse were two pilots and the shipmaster. The more senior of the two pilots was responsible for maneuvering the ship from the time of its undocking until after it had passed through the bridge. A tugboat assisted the African Neptune out of the dock, after which it maneuvered under its own power out of the port area and around several barges that were moored in the river. At around 9:43 p.m., the helmsman received orders to turn the ship's rudder "LEFT, 10°" in order to begin aligning the ship with the bridge opening. Shortly after these orders were given, Captain Stanejko relieved the ship's helmsman of duty and replaced him with another able seaman. According to a later report issued by the National Transportation Safety Board (NTSB) and the United States Coast Guard, Captain Stanejko relieved the initial helmsman of duty because he felt that the way the helmsman was responding to orders from the pilot was unsatisfactory. Henry Billitz, a crewmember who was aboard the African Neptune that night, later stated that the initial helmsman was drunk while on duty. At around 9:44 p.m., the pilot again ordered the rudder to be turned "LEFT, 10°".

At about 9:46 p.m., the ship had reached a point of no return where it was now completely committed to passing through the bridge opening. At this point, the pilot ordered the engines set to "FULL AHEAD" and ordered the rudder to be turned to "LEFT, 20°". Shortly after the orders for "LEFT, 20°" were given, a mate analyzed the rudder angle indicator and saw that the rudder was actually positioned at 10° to the right and was drifting further towards the right bank of the Brunswick River. The mate notified the helmsman, who began to turn the wheel to the left. At about 9:47 p.m., the senior pilot noticed that the rudder angle indicator was now showing a reading of 20° to the right, prompting him to order the helmsman to turn the rudder "HARD LEFT" and change the engines to "FULL ASTERN". After these new orders were relayed to the helmsman, the indicator began to increase to the right, towards about 25°. Around this time, orders were given to drop the starboard anchor, though about 105 fathoms (190 m) of line length went out before the anchor caught. At 9:48 p.m., the pilot ordered "HARD RIGHT", by which time the ship had slowed to about 1 to 2 knots (0.51 to 1.03 m/s).

At the time that the vertical lift span had been lifted, there were 24 people on the bridge. As these people began to notice the ship approach the bridge, several began to flee, with at least three making it off the bridge. At about 9:50 p.m., roughly 13 minutes after leaving the dock, the African Neptune struck the southern portion of the bridge. The impact occurred roughly 250 feet (80 m) south of the nearest lift span tower. (Note: This value comes from a 1974 report on the incident created by the United States Coast Guard. However, in a 1972 report from the Associated Press, the drawbridge operator at the time of the event estimated that the ship missed the bridge opening by about 300 to 400 ft (91 to 122 m).) Following the collision, three sections of the bridge, totaling roughly 450 feet (140 m) in total, fell into the river. (Note: Multiple sources, including a report from the Coast Guard, state that three sections of the bridge fell into the river. However, a contemporary report from the Associated Press states that the impact caused four sections to fall. Additionally, while most sources state that approximately 450 feet (140 m) fell, a 2018 article in The Brunswick News states that 350 feet (110 m) fell.) Ten motor vehicles, consisting of 8 cars and two semi-trailer trucks, and 24 people fell into the river, which at that point had a depth of about 30 feet (10 m).

== Response ==
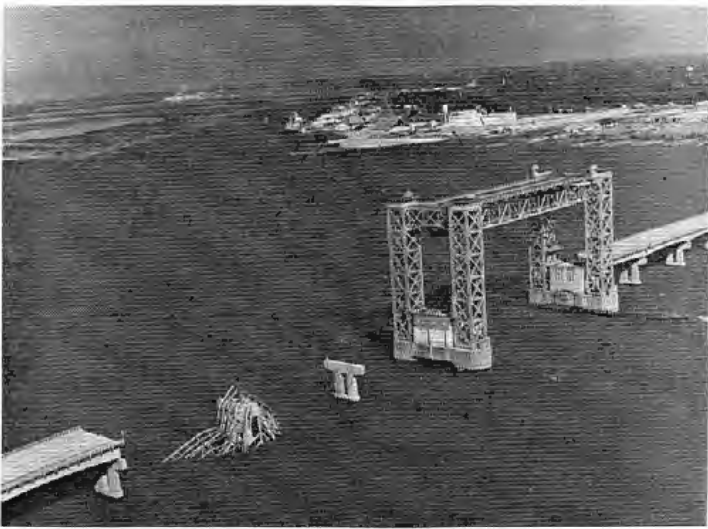
Aerial view of the collapsed bridge

Immediately following the collapse, crewmembers on the African Neptune began to throw lifebuoys into the river and deployed lifeboats in order to rescue individuals who had fallen from the bridge. Meanwhile, the bridge operator called the Brunswick Police Department and a distress signal was sent out. Several harbor craft, including the tugboat that had assisted the African Neptune, responded to the call, and emergency responders from many nearby jurisdictions and organizations, including police from Jekyll Island, the Georgia State Patrol, and Civil Defense units, also arrived. However, rescue efforts were hindered by the darkness and uncooperative weather. Several people were rescued from the water, while some people who had been on the bridge during the impact had managed to stay on the damaged structure. Survivors were taken to the Glynn-Brunswick Memorial Hospital for treatment. While initial reporting from the Associated Press listed only one person dead and eight missing, the death toll increased by the following day. In total, ten people were reported dead, while eleven others suffered injuries from the collapse. (Note: Most sources agree that the bridge collapse killed ten people. However, one contemporary report from United Press International states that at least 11 people died as result of the incident.)

== Aftermath ==
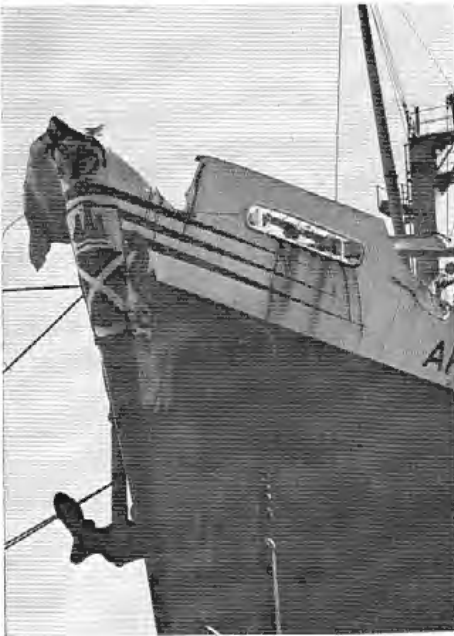
The African Neptune suffered some minor damage to its bow.

Immediately following the collapse, the port was closed overnight and the African Neptune was led by two tugboats to a dock for temporary repairs. While the ship was not in immediate danger of sinking, it had suffered some damage to its bow. The next day, the ship traveled to the Port of Savannah, where it unloaded its cargo and had permanent repairs made. Prior to leaving, Georgia Governor Jimmy Carter came to Brunswick to inspect the damage and talk to some of the ship's crew. Search and rescue operations continued into the next morning, though no additional survivors were found, and crews began to collect debris out of the river that same day. The last body was recovered from the wreckage by November 12. Initial reporting from United Press International (UPI) estimated that the bridge would be out of service for at least six months and would cost over $1 million ($7.7 million in 2025) to repair. As Interstate 95 in Georgia had not yet been constructed through Glynn County at the time, the only nearby detour option was through Georgia State Route 303 through Blythe Island. Shortly after the incident, the government of Georgia filed a lawsuit against the shipowners in the United States District Court for the Southern District of New York, seeking $2 million ($15.4 million in 2025) in damages and requesting that the ship be condemned and sold to satisfy this amount.

=== Investigation ===
On November 8, the United States Coast Guard began an investigation into the incident, and the National Transportation Safety Board (NTSB) also initiated an investigation. Initial reporting from UPI attributed the accident to either a mechanical issue with the steering gear or a piloting error. However, in their final reports issued in May 1974, the investigations revealed that the collision had been the result of the helmsman incorrectly entering the pilot's orders. As the ship approached the bridge opening, instead of properly applying the pilot's "LEFT" orders, the helmsman had ordered "RIGHT" directions. In their investigation, the NTSB found that the design of the wheelhouse may have played a factor in the accident, as the steering wheel was small and partially obscured from the helmsman's view, and other people in the wheelhouse were unable to see which way the wheel was being turned. Additionally, the rudder order indicator was a small instrument in a recessed area that required the viewer to be very close to read. Furthermore, the mate was not continuously monitoring the helmsman at the time because of other duties he had aboard the bridge. Thus, according to the NTSB, at the time that the helmsman was incorrectly applying orders, neither the shipmaster, the pilots, nor the mate, were monitoring the input with enough frequency to identify the error prior to the "point of no return". The Coast Guard also identified issues with the bridge configuration as contributing to the incident, as the ship, and other similarly designed ships, were required to be in a state of turning past the "point of no return" for making the bridge opening.

=== Later history ===
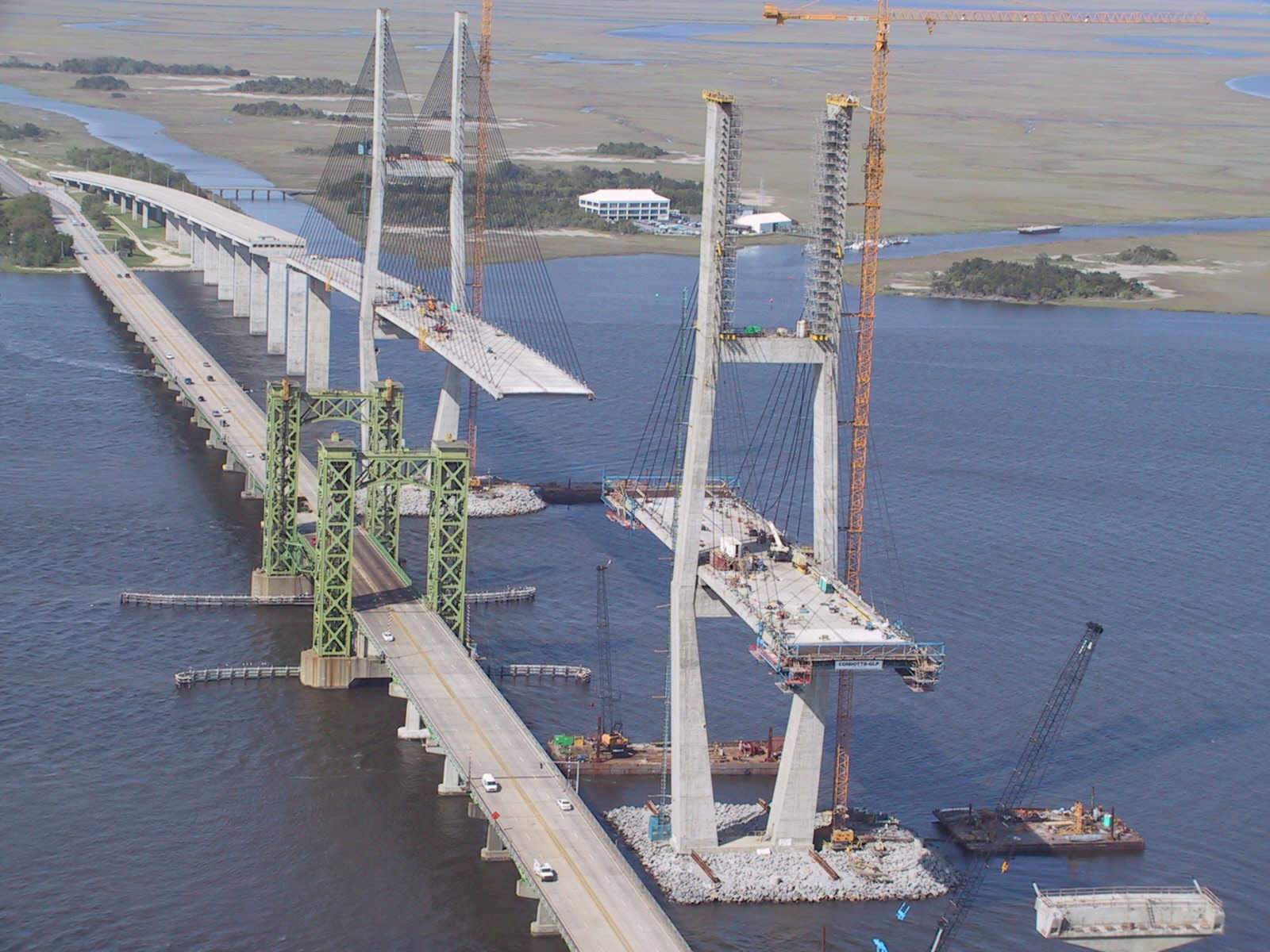
In 2003, the vertical-lift bridge was replaced by a cable-stayed bridge (pictured under construction, 2001).

Repairs to the bridge took six months to complete in total and cost approximately $1.3 million ($10 million in 2025). Following the repairs, barricades were set up to keep cars completely off of the main span of the bridge whenever the vertical-lift span was open in order to reduce the risk of casualties in any future bridge collapse.

While the 1972 collision was the first time a ship had struck the Sidney Lanier Bridge, it would not be the last, as in 1987, a Polish cargo ship struck the bridge. This collision occurred as the ship, the Ziema Bialostocka, was leaving the port and passing through the bridge opening. During that time, an anchor on the ship's starboard side made contact with a support tower on the bridge's southern side, causing approximately $3 million in damages ($8.5 million in 2025) and prompting the bridge to be closed for roughly five months. However, unlike the 1972 event, this incident did not cause any injuries or fatalities. Following this second collision, the Coast Guard declared the bridge a navigational hazard.

In 2003, the original vertical-lift bridge was replaced with a new cable-stayed bridge that featured improved bridge protection systems, such as several acres of artificial islands surrounding each of the new bridge's pylons. According to Billitz, the African Neptune impact was cited by several government officials as a reason for replacing the existing bridge. The new bridge, which kept the Sidney Lanier name, is the longest and tallest bridge in the state and features a large open area underneath its main span for cargo ships to pass through, eliminating the need for a drawbridge or vertical lift-span. Following the new bridge's completion, the old bridge was demolished, with only a small portion saved and modified into a fishing pier.

== See also ==
- List of bridge failures

== Sources ==
- "Ship Hits Georgia Bridge; One Killed and 8 Missing". The New York Times. Associated Press. November 8, 1972. p. 49. ISSN 0362-4331. OCLC 1645522. Archived from the original on January 8, 2018.
- "From 1990: Survivor recalls night that ship hit bridge in Brunswick in 1972". The Atlanta Journal-Constitution. Cox Enterprises. Associated Press. March 26, 2024 [April 2, 1990]. ISSN 1539-7459. OCLC 48488341. Archived from the original on April 18, 2024.
- Condon, Amy Paige (March 26, 2024). "Could a bridge collapse happen in Savannah or Brunswick? Georgia Ports leaders weigh in". Savannah Morning News. Gannett. ISSN 1047-028X. OCLC 51656980. Archived from the original on March 29, 2024.
- Davis, Jingle (March 26, 2024) [May 4, 1987]. "From 1987: Freighter collision would spur construction of new Brunswick bridge". The Atlanta Journal-Constitution. Cox Enterprises. ISSN 1539-7459. OCLC 48488341. Archived from the original on April 20, 2024.
- Hobbs, Larry (August 25, 2018). "Old Sidney Lanier Bridge marked by tragedy, endurance". The Brunswick News. ISSN 1090-3895. OCLC 259370667. Archived from the original on March 29, 2024.
- Horton, Amy (October 27, 2014) [January 31, 2001]. "Crewman of Ill-fated African Neptune Revisits Accident Site". The Brunswick News. ISSN 1090-3895. OCLC 259370667. Archived from the original on August 2, 2024.
- Jackson, L. E. (1989). "The National Transportation Safety Board's Role in the Investigation of Bridge Collapse with Emphasis on Recent Underwater Failures". Proceedings of the Bridge Scour Symposium. Federal Highway Administration and United States Geological Survey. pp. 323–339.
- Pittman, Meghan (November 6, 2012). "Night freighter hit bridge still vivid". The Brunswick News. ISSN 1090-3895. OCLC 259370667. Archived from the original on August 2, 2024.
- Sczcurek, G. D., ed. (October 1974). "13 Minutes". Proceedings of the Marine Safety Council. 31 (10). United States Coast Guard: 187–190, 201, 204. ISSN 0364-0981. OCLC 1144869969.
- "Death Toll Rises to 5 in Georgia River Crash". The New York Times. United Press International. November 9, 1972a. p. 93. ISSN 0362-4331. OCLC 1645522. Archived from the original on October 6, 2022.
- "Georgia Asking $2-Million From Ship That Hit Bridge". The New York Times. United Press International. November 11, 1972b. p. 66. ISSN 0362-4331. OCLC 1645522. Archived from the original on October 14, 2022.
