= Blythe Island =

Island in Glynn County, Georgia, United States

Coordinates: 31.174°N 81.544°W

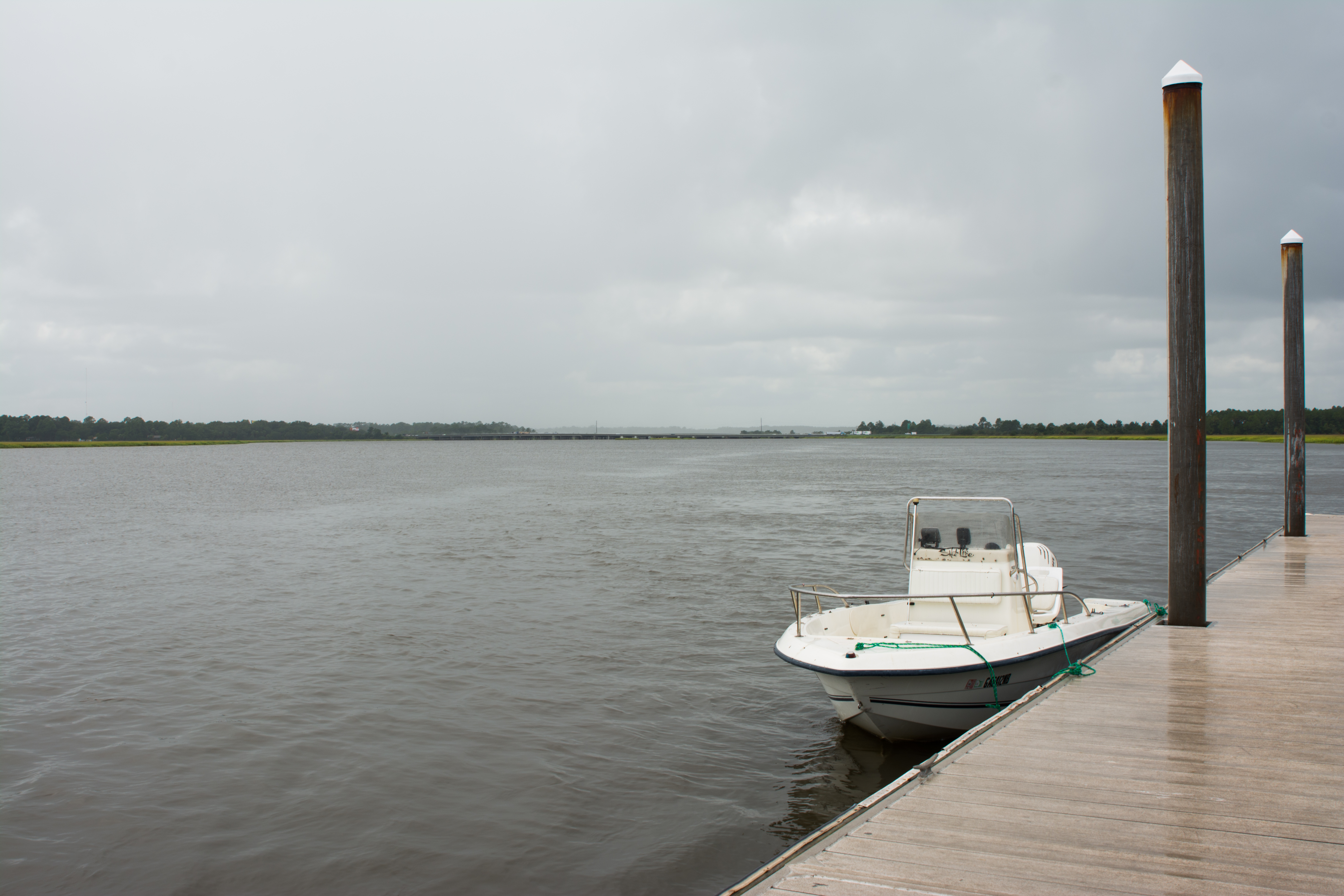
Turtle River, Blythe Island, Brunswick, GA

Blythe Island is located in Glynn County, Georgia, United States.

The primary mode of travel to the island is by automobile via Blythe Island Highway (GA-303). There is one traffic signal and one gas station on the island. The island is surrounded by the South Brunswick River to the west and the Turtle River to the east.

Points of interest on the island include the Blythe Island Baptist Church, the Chapel Grace Campus, and Camp Tolochee.

The Blythe Island Regional Park is a 1,100 acre public park offering sports, picnic areas, a playground, swimming and fishing in Lake Cindee, and a marina and dock access to the South Brunswick River.

== Education ==
Glynn County's public schools are operated by Glynn County School System.

Zoned schools include:

- Satilla Marsh Elementary School (SME)
- Risley Middle School (RMS)
- Glynn Academy (GA)
