= Sidney Lanier Bridge =

Cable-stayed bridge in Brunswick, Georgia, United States

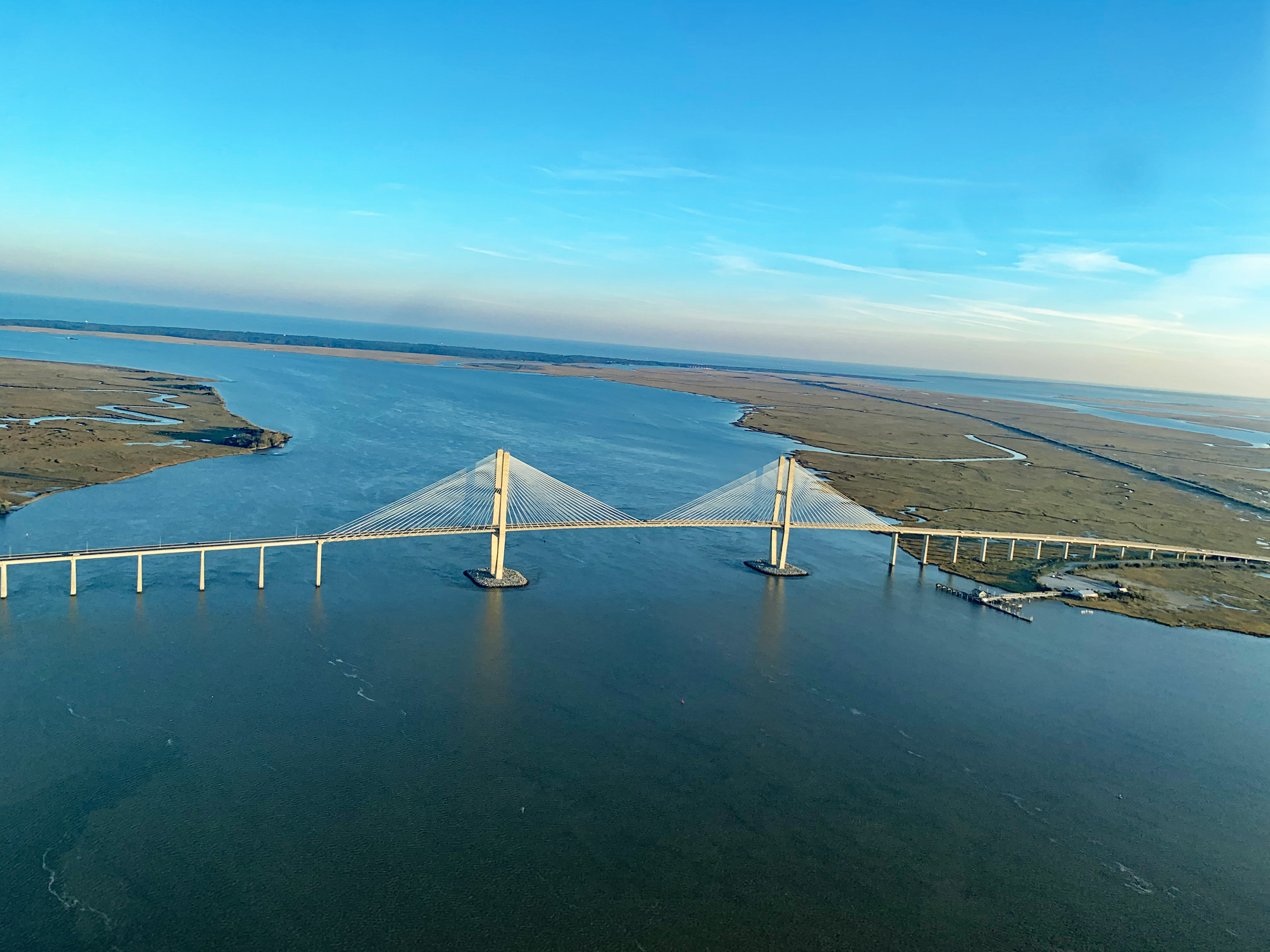
- The bridge in 2020
- Coordinates: 31°06′59″N 81°29′05″W
- Carries: US 17
- Crosses: Brunswick River
- Locale: Brunswick, Georgia, United States
- Named for: Sidney Lanier
- Owner: Georgia Department of Transportation

Characteristics
- Design: Cable-stayed bridge
- Material: Concrete
- No. of spans: 3

History
- Designer: Sverdrup & Parcel and J. E. Greiner Associates (first bridge); DRC Consultants (second bridge)
- Constructed by: Finley McNary, Recchi America, and GLF Construction Corporation (second bridge)
- Construction cost: $8 million (first bridge)
- Opened: 1956 (first bridge); 2003 (second bridge)
- Dedicated: July 18, 1956 (first bridge)

Location
- Interactive map of Sidney Lanier Bridge

The Sidney Lanier Bridge is a cable-stayed bridge that spans the Brunswick River in Brunswick, Georgia, United States. The bridge is named after Georgia-born poet Sidney Lanier and carries part of U.S. Route 17 in Georgia. It was also the name of an earlier bridge which was next to the current site.

The initial plans for a bridge at the location came from Georgia Governor Melvin E. Thompson, who thought it would help the tourism industry on nearby Jekyll Island. Construction commenced under his administration and continued under the next two governors, overseen by the State Toll Bridge Authority. The original bridge was a vertical-lift bridge that opened to traffic as a toll bridge in 1956. However, due to poor navigational clearance, the bridge suffered two ship collisions, with one in 1972 resulting in the deaths of ten individuals. Additionally, by the late 1990s, the low vertical clearance prevented larger cargo ships from accessing the Port of Brunswick, located upriver from the bridge. As a result, by 1998, work had commenced on a replacement bridge, which was completed in 2003. This new bridge, the third-longest cable-stayed bridge in the United States and Canada at the time of its opening, allowed for better access to the port and was designed with additional bridge safety features, such as artificial islands.

== Design ==
=== First bridge ===
The bridge was a four-lane north-south thoroughfare that carried U.S. Route 17 roughly 1 mi (1.6 km) over the Brunswick River. It was a vertical-lift bridge, which allowed for ship access to the Port of Brunswick upriver. The lift section had a horizontal clearance of 250 feet (76 m) and a vertical clearance at mean high water of 139.2 ft (42.4 m) when raised and 24 ft (7.3 m) when lowered. Only the central portion of the bridge was movable, with both approach sections remaining stationary.

=== Second bridge ===
The second bridge is a cable-stayed bridge with a central span of 1,250 ft (380 m). Additionally, it has two side spans, each measuring 625 ft (191 m). Like the previous bridge, it carries four travel lanes, each measuring 12 ft (3.7 m) wide, along with an 8 ft (2.4 m) wide shoulder. The concrete deck that the vehicles traverse is roughly 11 inches (280 mm) thick. On each side of the bridge is a concrete beam measuring 4.5 ft (1.4 m) by 5 ft (1.5 m), supported by the cables. The total width of the bridge is 79.5 ft (24.2 m). The most distinctive part of the bridge is two H-shaped concrete pylons, each 486 ft (148 m) tall. On each side of each pylon are 44 stay cables, 176 total, supporting the bridge. Each cable consists of multiple strands, measuring 0.6 in (15 mm) in diameter and encased in high-density polyethylene. The pylons are hollow in order to allow for inspection of the cable stay groundings. Additionally, the bridge features safety features in the form of artificial islands designed to prevent ship collisions.

== 1956 bridge ==
=== Construction ===
In 1947, the government of Georgia purchased Jekyll Island and converted it into a state park. Melvin E. Thompson, then-governor of Georgia, was a big promoter of this effort and pushed to increase tourism to the island while in office. To this end, he supported the construction of a bridge across the Brunswick River, near the island, that would reduce the travel distance between the city of Brunswick and the island by 14 miles (23 km). The bridge would be located immediately south of the city's downtown and about 5.4 mi (8.7 km) upstream from the river's mouth. Construction of this bridge began during Thompson's governorship, but shortly after it began, he lost reelection to Herman Talmadge, who was opposed to the bridge. By the time Talmadge took office, only the piers for the bridge had been constructed, and in 1949, he told an Atlanta-based radio station, "I shall let those piers stand as a naked monument to the greatest monstrosity ever perpetrated on the people of Georgia." Despite Talmadge's comments, construction on the bridge continued during his administration and that of his successor, Marvin Griffin.

The State Toll Bridge Authority oversaw the construction of the bridge, which was designed by Sverdrup & Parcel and J. E. Greiner Associates. The total cost of this bridge, which was completed in 1956, was $8 million (equivalent to $95 million in 2025). Additionally, a causeway connecting Jekyll Island to the mainland, which begins near the bridge, was built concurrently, with a total project cost of $12 million ($142 million in 2025) for the two structures. For the bridge, roughly two-thirds of the project's funds were provided by the federal government of the United States. While Thompson had initially planned for the bridge to be free for drivers to use, the authority decided to make it a toll bridge, at least until the bonds they had sold to finance it were paid off.

=== Dedication ===
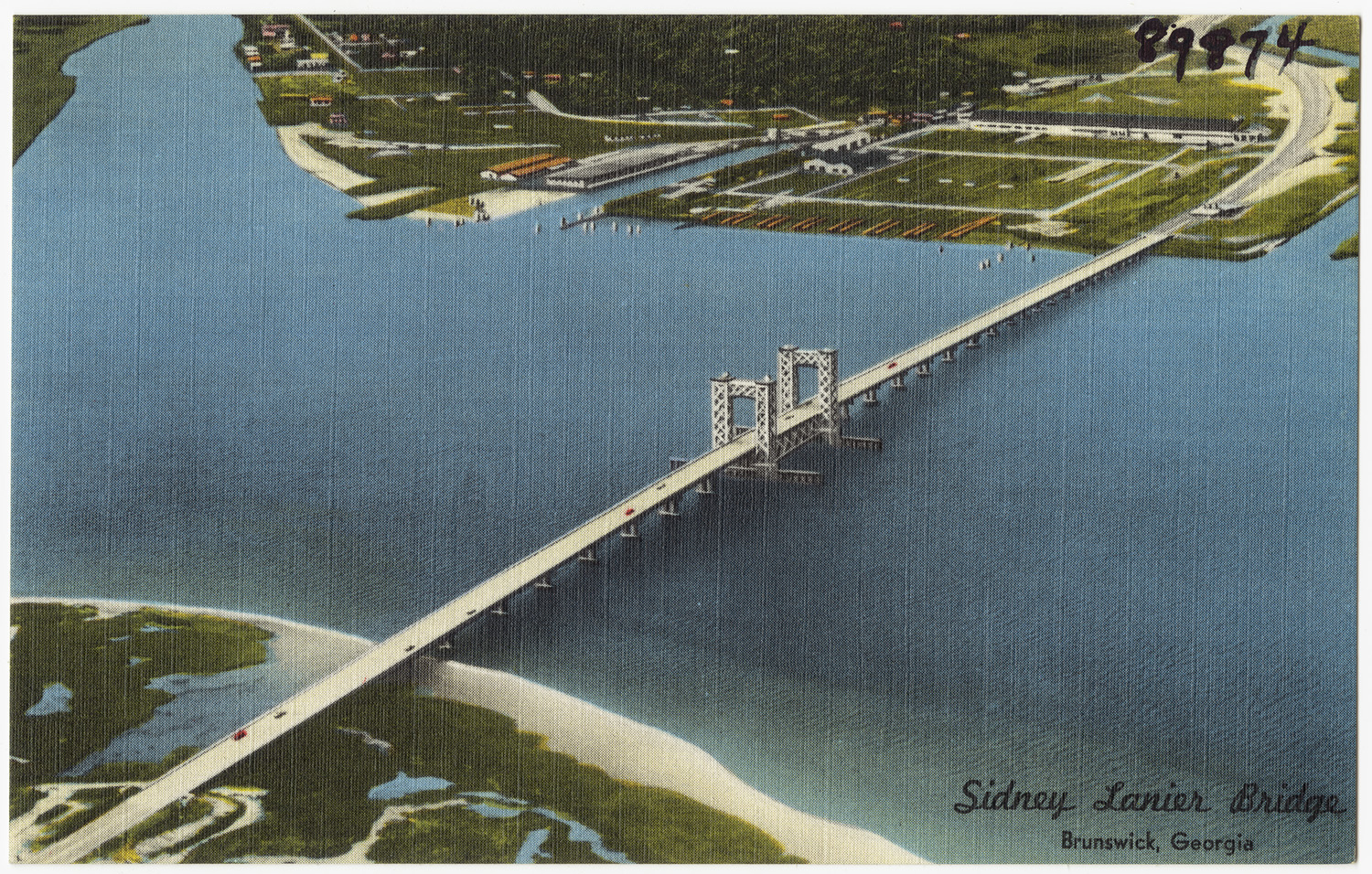
A postcard of the original vertical-lift bridge

In February 1956, the authority announced that the bridge would be named in honor of Sidney Lanier, a Georgia-born poet active in the 19th century. One of Lanier's more well-known poems, "The Marshes of Glynn", was written about the salt marshes of Glynn County, where the bridge was located. On April 6, The Atlanta Constitution reported that the authority was planning to open the bridge on May 18. However, by April 11, the date of the dedication ceremony, which would feature a speech from former Governor Talmadge, was reported as June 18. The Brunswick News reported that former Governor Thompson had not been invited to the ceremony, which journalist M. L. St. John of The Atlanta Constitution attributed to "littleness" on the behalf of the toll bridge authority, which was "try[ing] to ignore Thompson". The bridge opened to traffic in 1956, with Governor Griffin presiding over the dedication on July 18 of that year. The year of its opening, it was given an honorable mention as one of the most beautiful new bridges in the United States by the American Institute of Steel Construction.

=== Ship collisions ===
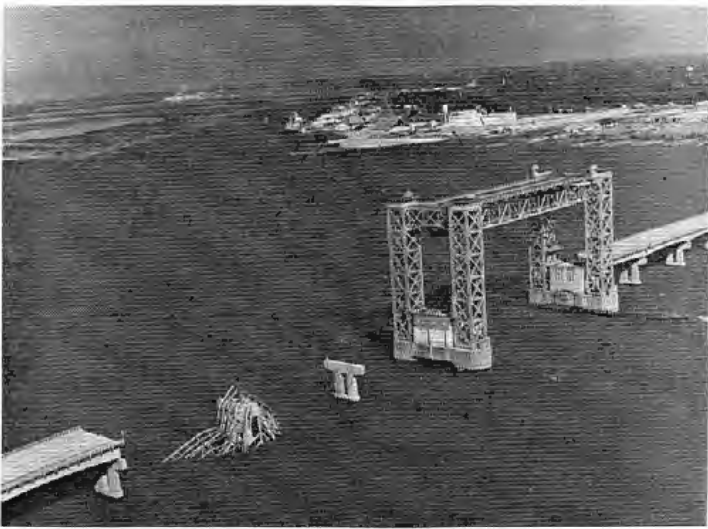
The bridge following the 1972 collapse

Due to the lift bridge's design, it suffered from poor navigational clearance. As a result, it suffered several ship collisions during its existence. In 1972, the SS African Neptune cargo ship collided with the bridge while attempting to pass through its opening, causing several sections of the bridge to collapse into the river. The collapse sent several vehicles into the river and resulted in the deaths of ten people. Several years later, in 1987, the Polish bulk carrier Ziemia Bialostocka collided with the bridge while also attempting to pass through the bridge's opening. While this collision did not result in any injuries or fatalities, it did cause roughly $1.4 million ($4 million in 2025) in damages. In addition to the collisions, by the 1990s, the poor clearance was preventing some larger ships from using the port, while the 20 ships that on average passed through the bridge on a daily basis proved to be a hindrance to automotive travel across the bridge.

== 2003 bridge ==
By 1998, construction had commenced on a replacement bridge, tentatively referred to as the "New Sidney Lanier Bridge". It was designed by DRC Consultants, with Recchi America and GLF Construction Corporation serving as contractors and Finley McNary assisting in construction. Figg Engineering Group performed the building inspection. The new cable-stayed bridge, with greater navigational clearance and safety features, was designed to address the safety issues of the previous bridge and both improve road traffic and allow for larger ships to access the port. At the time, it was planned to open in 2000, after which the old bridge would be demolished. However, it actually opened in 2003. At the time of its opening, it had the third-longest span of any cable-stayed bridge in the United States and Canada, behind only the Dames Point Bridge in Florida and the Fred Hartman Bridge in Texas. It is owned and operated by the Georgia Department of Transportation.

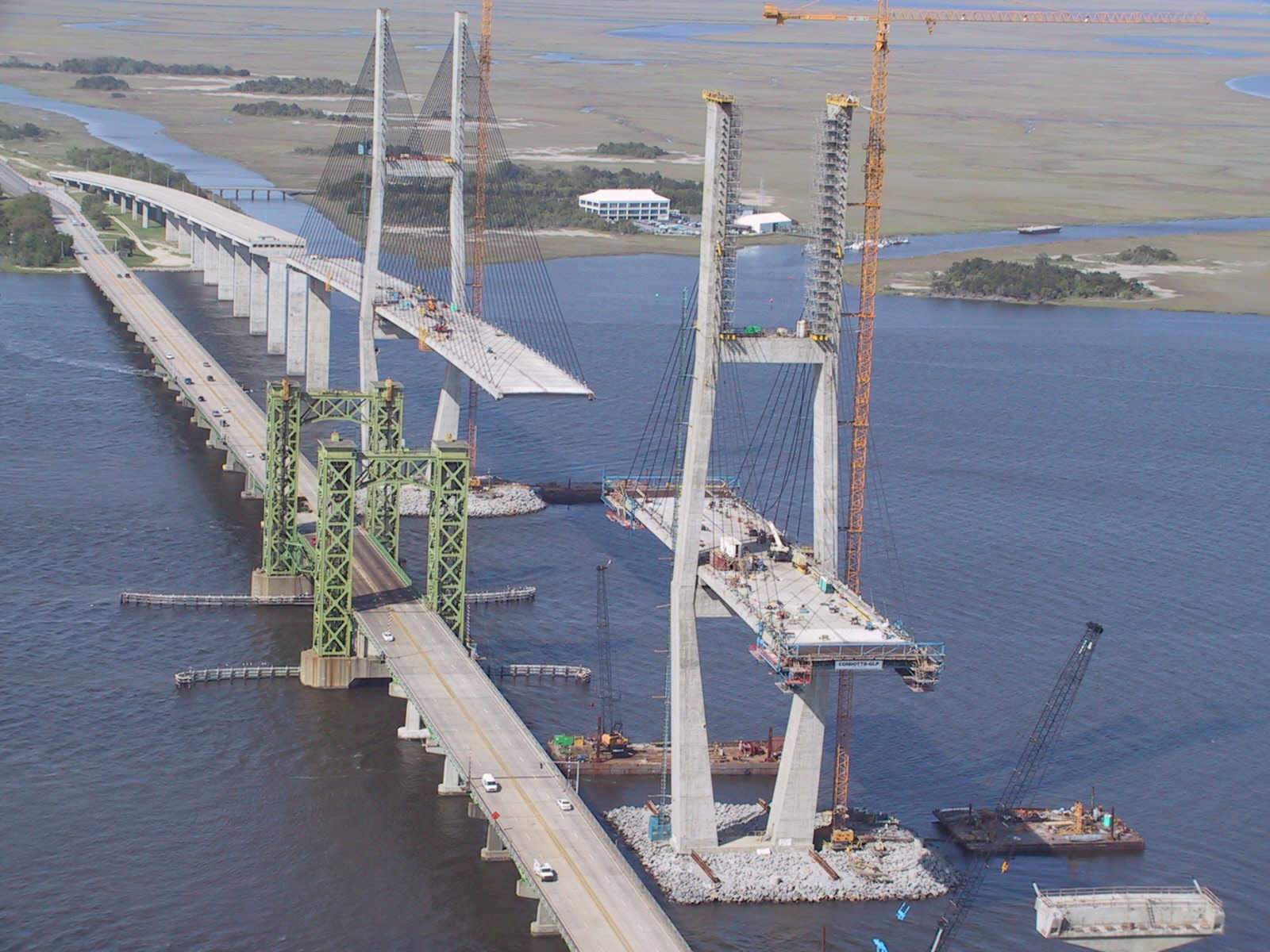
The new cable-stayed bridge under construction in 2001

== Incidents ==
In May 2025, the bodies of two unidentified people were found under the bridge; they had reportedly been there for some months.

== Sources ==
- AASHTO LRFD Movable Highway Bridge Design Specifications (2nd ed.). Washington, D.C.: American Association of State Highway and Transportation Officials. 2007. ISBN 978-1-56051-369-8. OCLC 123359339.
- Foxwell, Trish (2013). A Visitor's Guide to the Literary South. Woodstock, Vermont: Countryman Press. ISBN 978-1-58157-149-3. OCLC 852957188.
- Frandsen, A. G. (1998). "Design aspects for ship-bridge collisions for selected recent major bridge projects". In Gluver, Henrik; Olsen, Dan (eds.). Ship Collision Analysis. Rotterdam: A. A. Balkema. pp. 23–40. ISBN 978-1-351-41668-9. OCLC 1242425325.
- Gao, Lubin (2014). "Cable-Stayed Bridges". In Chen, Wai-Fah; Duan, Lian (eds.). Handbook of International Bridge Engineering. Boca Raton, Florida: CRC Press. pp. 86–92. doi:10.1201/b15520. ISBN 978-1-4398-1030-9. OCLC 859154927. Archived from the original on June 17, 2023.
- Hayes, Miles O.; Michel, Jacqueline (2013). A Tide-Swept Coast of Sand and Marsh: Coastal Geology and Ecology of Georgia. Illustrated by Joseph M. Holmes. Columbia, South Carolina: Pandion Books. ISBN 978-0-9816618-3-4. OCLC 868042600.
- Krakow, Kenneth (1994) [1975]. Georgia Place-Names: Their History and Origins (2nd ed.). Macon, Georgia: Winship Press. ISBN 978-0-915430-00-0. OCLC 1482211.
- "Transportation". Government Reports: Announcements & Index. 88 (17). Alexandria, Virginia: National Technical Information Service: 254–260. September 1, 1988. ISBN 978-0-8406-0222-0.
- Tabatabai, Habib (2005). Inspection and Maintenance of Bridge Stay Cable Systems: A Synthesis of Highway Practice. National Cooperative Highway Research Program. Vol. 353. Washington, D.C.: Transportation Research Board. ISBN 978-0-309-09760-4. OCLC 64445403.
- Tang, M. C. (2019). "Durability of bridges". In Caspeele, Robby; Taerwe, Luc; Frangopol, Dan M. (eds.). Life Cycle Analysis and Assessment in Civil Engineering: Towards an Integrated Vision. Boca Raton, Florida: CRC Press. pp. 3–7. ISBN 978-1-351-85757-4. OCLC 1057725706.
- Ports of Savannah and Brunswick, Georgia. Port Series. Vol. 14. Washington, D.C.: United States Army Corps of Engineers Water Resources Support Center; prepared by Navigation Data Center. United States Government Printing Office. 2000.
