= Zuta =

Zuta may refer to:

== People ==
- Audrius Žuta (born 1969), Lithuanian footballer
- Jack Zuta (1888–1930), American mobster
- Leonard Zuta (born 1992), Macedonian footballer

== Places ==
- Zuta, Georgia, unincorporated community
