= Port of Brunswick =

Atlantic Seaport in southeast Georgia, United States

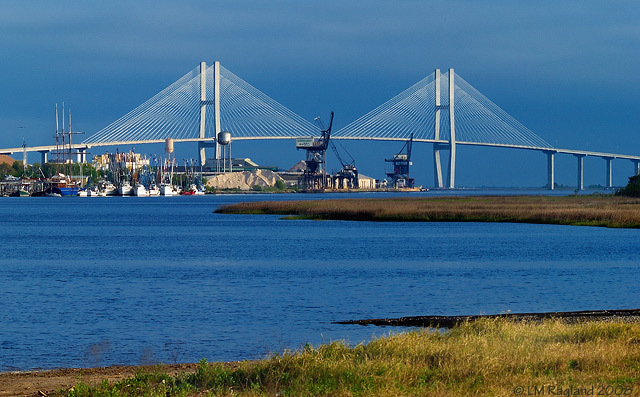
- The Port of Brunswick and the Sidney Lanier Bridge
- Interactive map of Port of Brunswick

Location
- Country: United States of America
- Location: Brunswick, Georgia, U.S.A.
- Coordinates: 31.1290591°N 81.5440113°W
- UN/LOCODE: USSAV

Details
- Opened: 1771
- Owned by: Georgia Ports Authority
- Type of Harbor: river natural
- Draft depth: Depth 42 feet (13 m)
- Air draft: 185 feet, restricted by Sidney Lanier Bridge

Statistics
- Annual cargo tonnage: 2.632 million (FY2020)
- Website https://gaports.com/facilities/port-of-brunswick/

The Port of Brunswick is an Atlantic seaport in Brunswick, Georgia, United States, in the southeast corner of the state. On February 12, 2025 the president of Georgia Ports Authority announced that the Colonel’s Island Terminal in Brunswick had replaced the Port of Baltimore as the busiest port for automobiles, construction and heavy farm equipment in the United States for 2024. This follows the Francis Scott Key Bridge collapse and that port's closure for almost three months.

== History ==
Brunswick is situated on a peninsula circumscribed by the Turtle River and East River on the west, and Brunswick River on the south. The river's convergence formed a natural harbor, which was why the Council of Georgia decided to establish a town there in the 1770s. In 1789, President George Washington proclaimed Brunswick as one of the five original ports of entry for the Thirteen Colonies. During the American Civil War, the city prospered as the port became a major exporter of cotton, lumber, timber and naval stores. The Great Depression and the reduction in cotton production and naval stores for export nearly shut the port down. However in World War II, close to 100 Liberty ships were constructed for use by the Merchant Marine. During the war years, the traditional Blessing of the Fleet in Brunswick was begun.

== Activity ==
Exported products include wood pulp, paper products, wheat, soybeans, and heavy machinery. Brunswick is the primary U.S. port of automobile imports for manufacturers Jaguar, Land Rover, Porsche, Mitsubishi and Volvo. Hyundai and Volkswagen also import vehicles there.

Ford, GM and Mercedes export vehicles through Port of Brunswick. Other exports include agricultural products such as barley malt, corn and oats; other bulk cargo includes cement, gypsum, limestone, perlite, salt and sand.

== Facilities ==
Port of Brunswick terminal locations
1 Colonel's Island Terminal
2 Mayor's Point Terminal
3 East River Terminal and Lanier Dock

The Port of Brunswick includes three GPA-owned deep-water terminals, two of which are directly operated by the GPA.

- Colonel's Island Terminal: Owned and operated by the GPA, the facility has three berths and three on-terminal auto processors. The 1,700-acre (7 km^{2})-plus facility features 3,355 feet (1,023 m) of continuous berthing and more than 637-acre (3 km^{2}) of paved open storage. The facility also handles break-bulk and project cargo.
- Mayor's Point Terminal specializes in break-bulk and project cargo, in particular the handling forest products. The 22-acre (0.1 km^{2}) facility features 1,200 feet (366 m) of deepwater berthing, approximately 355,000 square feet (33,000 m^{2}) of covered storage and 7.9 acres (32,100 m^{2}) of open, versatile storage.
- East River Terminal and Lanier Dock, operated by Logistec U.S.A., specializes in the handling of break-bulk and bulk commodities. The 66-acre (0.3 km^{2}) facility features 1,600 feet (488 m) of deepwater berthing, approximately 688,000 square feet (64,000 m^{2}) of covered storage and 15 acres (61,000 m^{2}) of open, versatile storage.

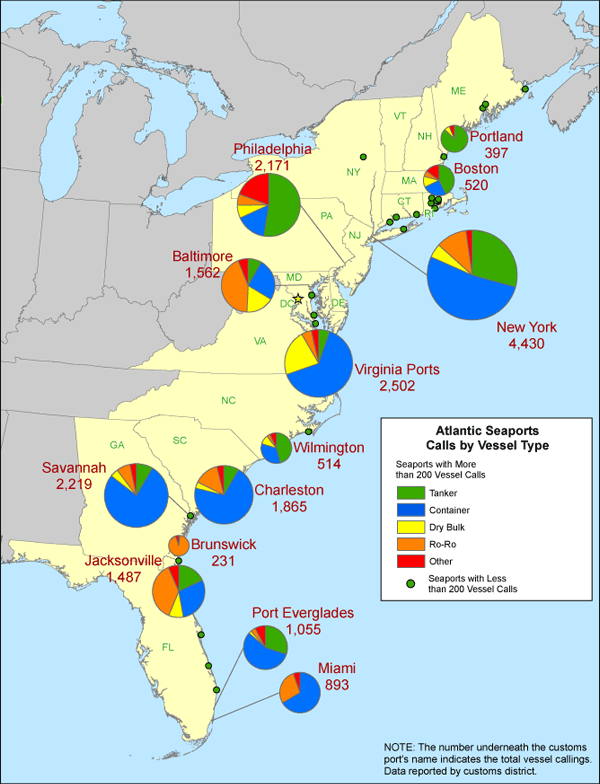
East Coast port calls by vessel type

== Expansion ==
In September 2024 the Georgia Ports Authority announced a port expansion at Colonel’s Island that includes an expanded passageway for vessels, widening the curve, and an enlarged turning basin. Plans also include the construction of 50 additional acres of paved vehicle storage.
