= Jewtown =

Jewtown or Jew Town may refer to:

- Jewtown, Baltimore, colloquial name for East Baltimore's Jewish community
- Jewtown, Georgia, an unincorporated community
- Jewtown, Pennsylvania, an unincorporated community
- Maxwell Street in Chicago, Illinois
- The historical Cochin Jewish district in Kochi, India
- Kensington Market in Toronto was also known as the Jewish Market or "Jew Town" as late as the 1970s
- A boy band and music video created by Australian Jewish satirist John Safran for the series John Safran's Music Jamboree
