= Jamaica, Georgia =

- Unincorporated community
- Location within Georgia Location within the United States
- Coordinates: 31°15′07″N 81°39′08″W
- Country: United States
- State: Georgia
- County: Glynn
- Time zone: UTC-5 (Eastern (EST))
  - Summer (DST): UTC-4 (EDT)
- Area code: 912
- GNIS feature ID: 332087

Jamaica is an unincorporated community in Glynn County, in the U.S. state of Georgia.

== History ==
A post office called Jamaica was established in 1872, and remained in operation until 1905. The community was named after Jamaica, New York, the home of a railroad promoter.
