= Altamaha Park, Georgia =

- Unincorporated community
- Location within Georgia Location within the United States
- Coordinates: 31°25′36″N 81°36′25″W
- Country: United States
- State: Georgia
- County: Glynn
- Time zone: UTC-5 (Eastern (EST))
  - Summer (DST): UTC-4 (EDT)
- Area code: 912
- GNIS feature ID: 354293

Altamaha Park, also known as Seaboard, is an unincorporated community in Glynn County, in the U.S. state of Georgia.

== History ==
A variant name was "Altama". The community has its name from the Altamaha River.
