= Georgia State Route 303 =

Highway in Georgia, United States

State Route 303
- SR 303 highlighted in red

Route information
- Maintained by GDOT
- Length: 9.1 mi (14.6 km)

Major junctions
- South end: US 17 / US 82 / SR 25 / SR 520 southwest of Brunswick
- US 25 / US 341 / SR 27 in Dock Junction; SR 25 Spur in Brunswick
- North end: US 17 / SR 25 in Country Club Estates

Location
- Country: United States
- State: Georgia
- Counties: Glynn

Highway system
- Georgia State Highway System; Interstate; US; State; Special
← SR 302	→ SR 304

State Route 303 (SR 303) is a 9.1-mile-long (14.6 km) south–north state highway in the southeast part of the U.S. state of Georgia. It travels completely within Glynn County, and is in the Brunswick metropolitan area.

== Route description ==
SR 303 begins at an intersection with US 17/SR 25/SR 520 southwest of Brunswick, which is also the eastern terminus of US 82. The route travels northeast across the South Brunswick and Turtle rivers, then arcs to the east. After that curve, it intersects US 25/US 341/SR 27 in Dock Junction. It then makes a curve to the southeast, meeting an intersection with SR 25 Spur. The highway continues southeast, meeting its northern terminus, a second intersection with US 17/SR 25 in Country Club Estates. The route acts as a bypass for US 17/SR 25 around Brunswick.

== History ==
The original (former) corridor of SR 303 was what is now the corridor of Interstate 95.

== Major intersections ==
The entire route is in Glynn County.

Location	mi	km	Destinations	Notes
	0.0	0.0	US 17 / US 82 / SR 25 / SR 520	Southern terminus
South Brunswick River	1.2	1.9	Crossing	
Turtle River	4.4	7.1	Crossing	
Dock Junction	6.5	10.5	US 25 / US 341 / SR 27 (Norwich Street Exd)	
Brunswick	8.6	13.8	SR 25 Spur (Golden Isles Parkway) to I-95	
Country Club Estates	9.1	14.6	US 17 / SR 25 (Darien Highway)	Northern terminus
1.000 mi = 1.609 km; 1.000 km = 0.621 mi
