= Jewtown, Georgia =

- Unincorporated community
- Location within Georgia Location within the United States
- Coordinates: 31.16218°N 81.39676°W
- Country: United States
- State: Georgia
- County: Glynn
- Time zone: UTC-5 (Eastern (EST))
  - Summer (DST): UTC-4 (EDT)
- Area code: 912
- GNIS feature ID: 332100

Jewtown is an unincorporated community on St. Simons Island in Glynn County, Georgia, United States.

== History ==
Jewtown was one of three historic African American communities on Saint Simons settled after the Civil War by emancipated slaves.

The town got its name from the presence of a store established by Jewish members of the Levison family in the 1880s. A variant name for the town was "Levisonton". After the Civil War Anson Dodge and the Georgia Land and Lumber Company of New York purchased the Hamilton Plantation at Gascoigne Bluff in 1875 to build lumber mills to take advantage of strong global demand. Sig and Robert (Bob) Levison of nearby Brunswick built a general merchandise store about a mile east of the mills. The store was closed in 1921.
