= Zuta, Georgia =

- Unincorporated Community
- Location within the state of Georgia
- Coordinates: 31°19′15″N 81°35′2″W
- Country: United States
- State: Georgia
- County: Glynn
- Elevation: 20 ft (6.1 m)
- Time zone: UTC-5 (Eastern (EST))
  - Summer (DST): UTC-4 (EDT)
- GNIS feature ID: 326606

Zuta is an unincorporated community located in Glynn County, Georgia, United States. The community of Zuta is named after the Zuta Branch of the Cowpen Swamp, a feature of the Altamaha River floodplain.
