= The Brunswick News =

- The 2007-08-19 front page of The Brunswick News
- Type: Daily newspaper
- Format: Broadsheet
- Owner: Brunswick News Publishing Co.
- Founded: 1902
- Headquarters: 3011 Altama Ave; Brunswick, Georgia; United States
- Circulation: 14,823 (as of 2013)
- Website: thebrunswicknews.com

The Brunswick News, based in Brunswick, Georgia, United States, is a daily newspaper in southeast Georgia. It was founded by the Leavy brothers and began publication in 1901. The paper remains under the family ownership and is published Monday through Saturday. Brunswick News Publishing Co. also publishes Coastal Illustrated and Golden Isles magazine.

Brunswick has one of the oldest ports in the US, and much of the Brunswick News covered maritime and shipping. The paper's local news extends to the Golden Isles of Georgia, including St. Simons and Jekyll. It also carries more international news than other local papers using the Associated Press wire.

== History ==
Brothers Arthur H. And Louis J. Leavy started the Brunswick Daily News on September 23, 1901 as a Democratic daily. It became the only newspaper in town just three months later, and Clarence H. Leavy left his post at the Atlanta Constitution to join his brothers as editor. Arthur departed the paper in 1903, leaving Louis and Clarence to manage the Daily News. They changed the title to The Brunswick News in 1906 and ran it for the next 40 years.

After Clarence Leavy died in 1946, his son Clarence H. Leavy Jr. took over management with Louis. Clarence H. "Howard" Leavy III succeeded his father in 1983, and his sons C.H. "Buff" Leavy IV and C. Vance Leavy took up the paper after Howard's retirement in 1999. The Brunswick News continues to be operated by the Leavy family today.

Effective January 1, 2024, The News discontinued the publication of its Monday print edition, with the new print schedule becoming Tuesday through Saturday.
