= Brunswick River (Georgia) =

River in Georgia (USA)

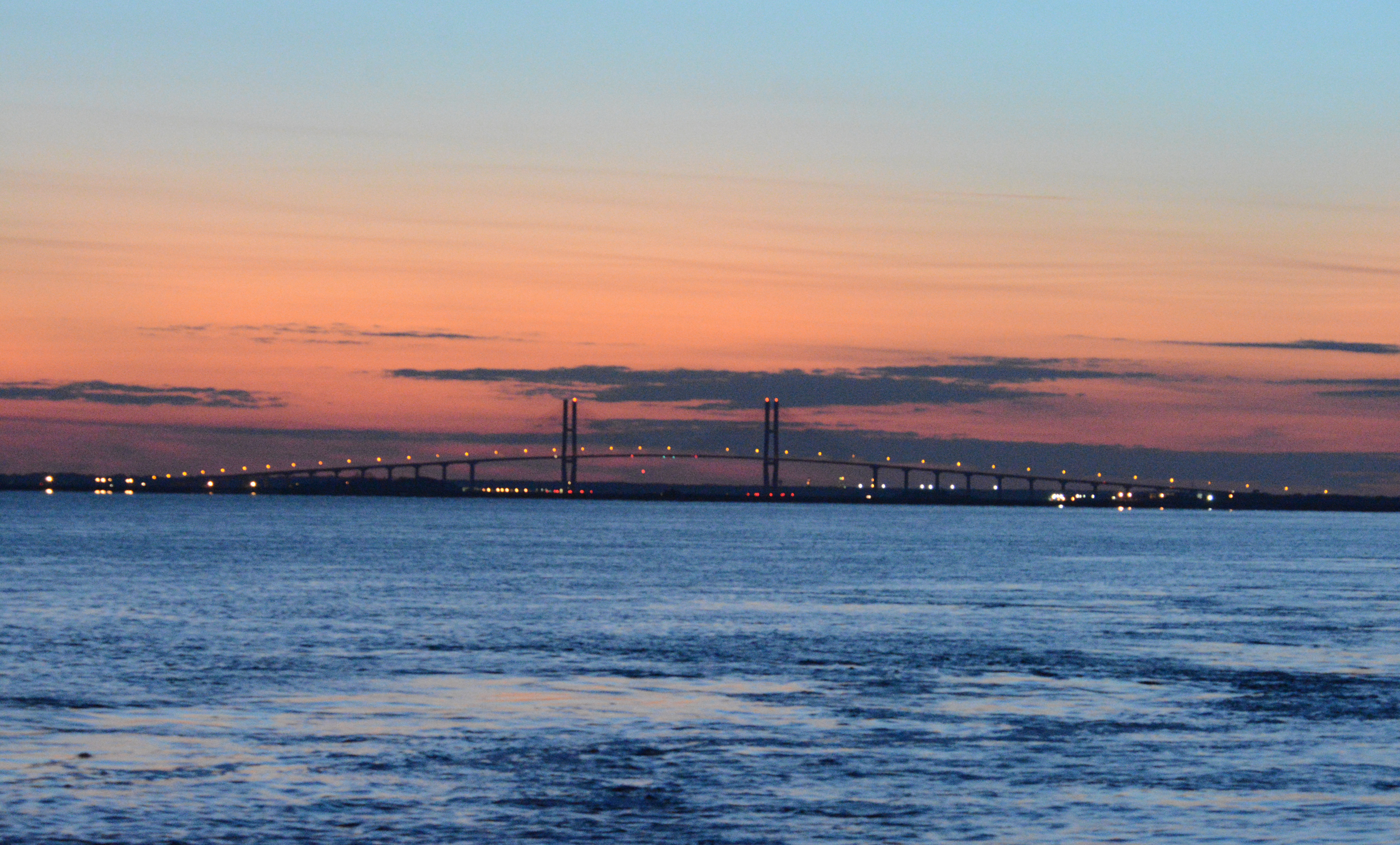
- The Sidney Lanier Bridge over the Brunswick River

- Location of mouth

Location
- Country: United States
- State: Georgia

Physical characteristics
- Source
  - location: Glynn County, Georgia
- Mouth
  - coordinates: 31°07′13″N 81°25′35″W
  - elevation: 0 m

The Brunswick River is a 6-mile-long (10 km) tidal river in Glynn County, Georgia. It begins at the confluence of the South Brunswick River with the Turtle River southeast of Brunswick and flows east to St. Simons Sound, the strait between Saint Simons Island to the north and Jekyll Island to the south.

The Lanier Bridge crosses the Brunswick River, I-95 and Georgia State Route 303 cross the Turtle River, the Torres Causeway crosses St. Simons Sound, and the Jekyll Island Causeway crosses Jekyll Sound.

== See also ==
- List of rivers of Georgia
