= Glynn County, Georgia =

County in Georgia, United States

- County
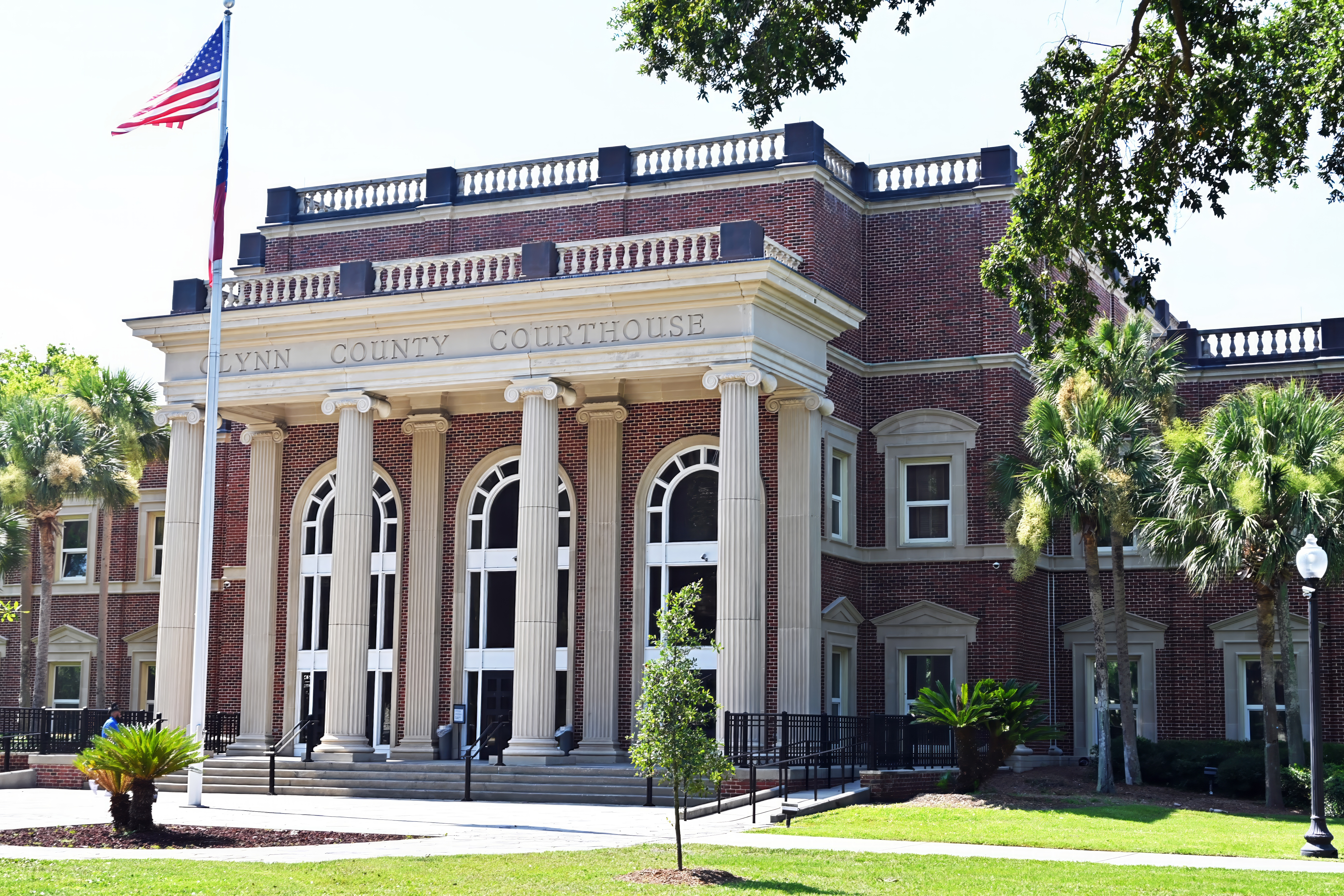
- Glynn County Courthouse

- Seal Logo

- Location within the U.S. state of Georgia
- Coordinates: 31°13′N 81°29′W
- Country: United States
- State: Georgia
- Founded: 1777; 249 years ago
- Named for: John Glynn
- Seat: Brunswick
- Largest city: Brunswick

Government
  - Chairman, Board of Commissioners: David O'Quinn

Area
  - Total: 585 sq mi (1,520 km^{2})
  - Land: 420 sq mi (1,100 km^{2})
  - Water: 165 sq mi (430 km^{2}) 28.3%

Population (2020)
  - Total: 84,499
  - Estimate (2025): 87,599 ▲
  - Density: 201/sq mi (78/km^{2})
- Time zone: UTC−5 (Eastern)
  - Summer (DST): UTC−4 (EDT)
- Congressional district: 1st
- Website: glynncounty.org

Glynn County is located in the southeastern part of the U.S. state of Georgia. As of the 2020 census, the population was 84,499. The county seat is Brunswick. Glynn County is part of the Brunswick, Georgia Metropolitan Statistical Area.

== History ==
Glynn County, one of the state's original eight counties created on February 5, 1777, was named after John Glynn, a member of the British House of Commons who defended the cause of the American Colonies before the American Revolution. The Battle of Bloody Marsh was fought in Glynn County. James Oglethorpe built Fort Frederica, which was used a base in the American Revolutionary War. Glynn Academy, established to educate boys, is the second oldest school in Georgia.

Glynn County includes the most prominent of the Sea Islands of Georgia, including Jekyll Island, St. Simons Island, and Sea Island. The Georgia poet Sidney Lanier immortalized the seacoast there in his poem, "The Marshes of Glynn", which begins:

Glooms of the live-oaks, beautiful-braided and woven
With intricate shades of the vines that myriad-cloven
Clamber the forks of the multiform boughs,--

Emerald twilights,--
Virginal shy lights,

Wrought of the leaves to allure to the whisper of vows,
When lovers pace timidly down through the green colonnades
Of the dim sweet woods, of the dear dark woods,
Of the heavenly woods and glades,
That run to the radiant marginal sand-beach within

The wide sea-marshes of Glynn;--

During World War II, Naval Air Station Glynco, named for the county, was a major base for training for blimps and anti-submarine warfare. The Federal Law Enforcement Training Center (FLETC) now uses a substantial part of the former NAS as its main campus.

== Geography ==
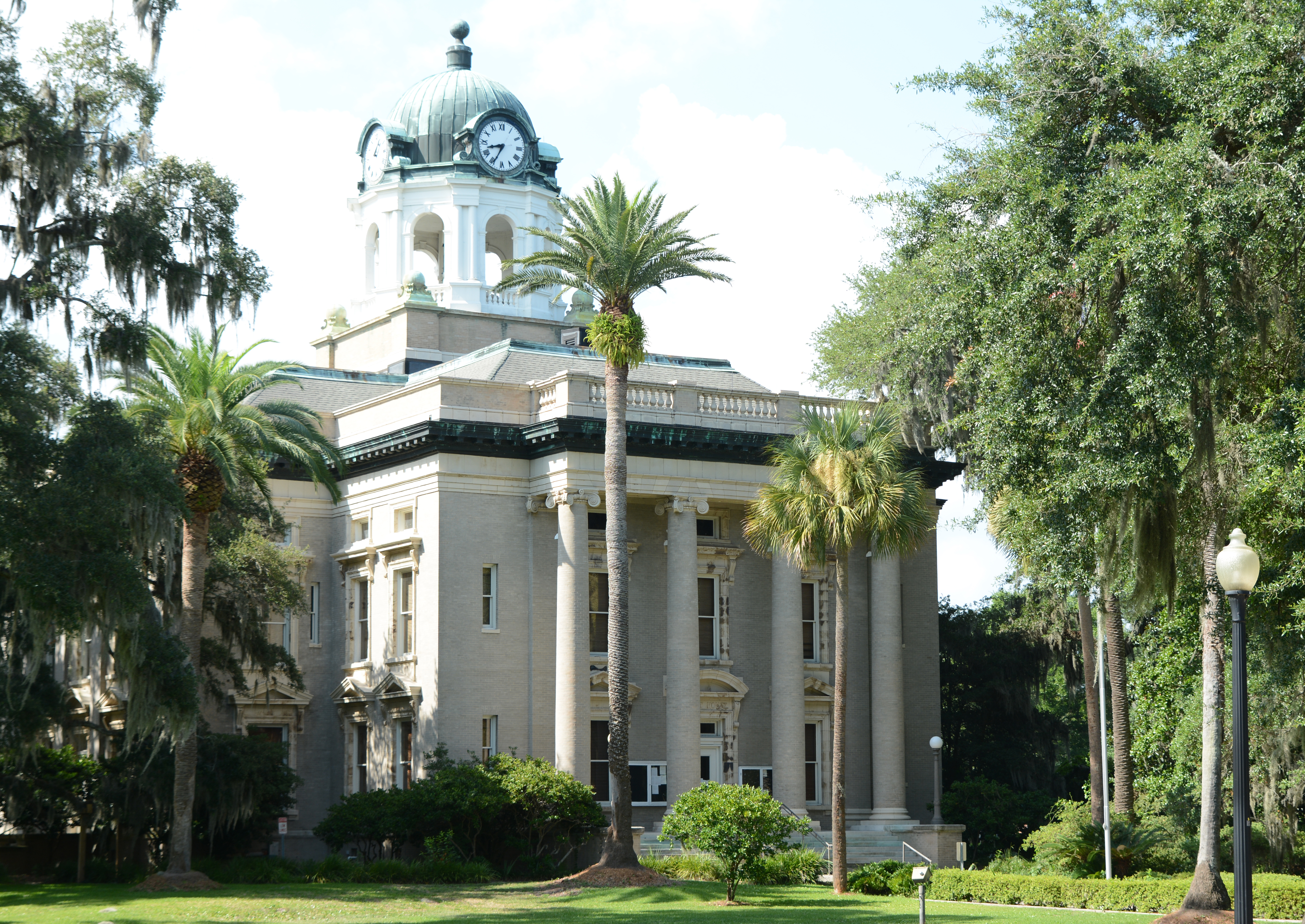
Old Glynn County Courthouse

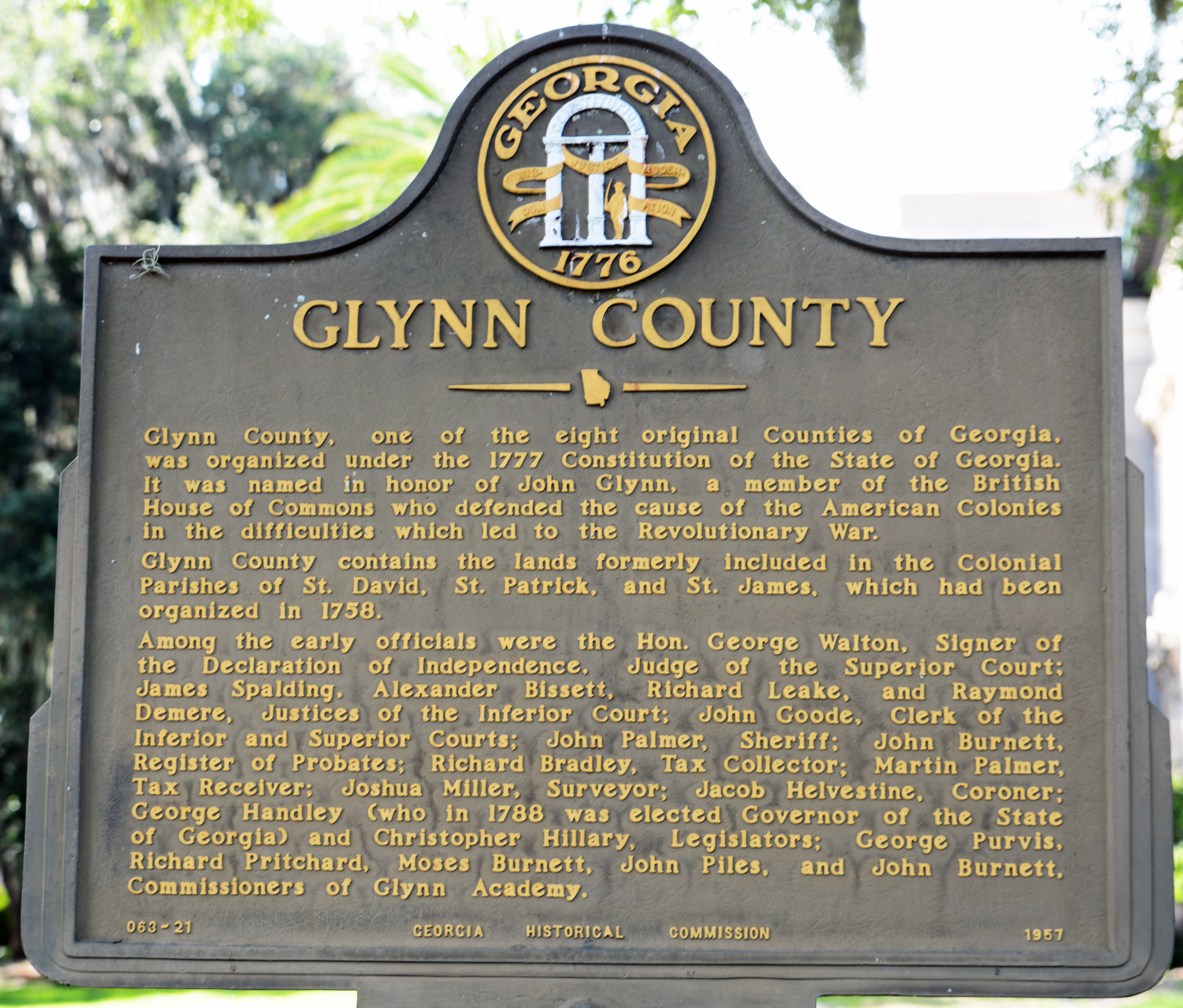
Historical marker

According to the U.S. Census Bureau, the county has a total area of 585 square miles (1,520 km^{2}), of which 420 square miles (1,100 km^{2}) is land and 165 square miles (430 km^{2}) (28.3%) is water.

The majority of Glynn County is located in the Cumberland-St. Simons sub-basin of the St. Marys- Satilla River basin. Most of the county's northern and northwestern border area is located in the Altamaha River sub-basin of the basin by the same name.

=== Major highways ===
- I-95 / SR 405 (unsigned)
- US 17 / SR 25
  - SR 25 Conn.
  - SR 25 Spur
- US 25
- US 82
- US 341 / SR 27
- SR 32
- SR 99
- SR 303
- SR 520

=== Adjacent counties ===
- McIntosh County - north
- Camden County - southwest
- Brantley County - west
- Wayne County - northwest

== Communities ==
=== City ===
- Brunswick

=== Census-designated places ===
- Country Club Estates
- Dock Junction
- Everett
- Jekyll Island
- St. Simons
- Sterling

=== Unincorporated communities ===
- Altamaha Park
- Anguilla
- Jamaica
- Jewtown
- Pennick
- Zuta

=== Ghost towns ===
- Belle Vista
- Bladen
- Thalmann

== Demographics ==
Historical population
Census	Pop.	Note	%±
1790	413		—
1800	1,874		353.8%
1810	3,417		82.3%
1820	3,418		0.0%
1830	4,567		33.6%
1840	5,302		16.1%
1850	4,933		−7.0%
1860	3,889		−21.2%
1870	5,376		38.2%
1880	6,497		20.9%
1890	13,420		106.6%
1900	14,317		6.7%
1910	15,720		9.8%
1920	19,370		23.2%
1930	19,400		0.2%
1940	21,920		13.0%
1950	29,046		32.5%
1960	41,954		44.4%
1970	50,528		20.4%
1980	54,981		8.8%
1990	62,496		13.7%
2000	67,568		8.1%
2010	79,626		17.8%
2020	84,499		6.1%
2025 (est.)	87,599	▲	3.7%
U.S. Decennial Census; 1790-1880 1890-1910; 1920-1930 1930-1940; 1940-1950 1960-1980; 1980-2000 2010

=== Racial and ethnic composition ===
Glynn County, Georgia – Racial and ethnic composition Note: the US Census treats Hispanic/Latino as an ethnic category. This table excludes Latinos from the racial categories and assigns them to a separate category. Hispanics/Latinos may be of any race.
Race / Ethnicity (NH = Non-Hispanic)	Pop 1980	Pop 1990	Pop 2000	Pop 2010	Pop 2020	% 1980	% 1990	% 2000	% 2010	% 2020
White alone (NH)	39,788	45,620	46,566	51,602	52,987	72.37%	73.00%	68.92%	64.81%	62.71%
Black or African American alone (NH)	14,371	15,874	17,711	20,525	20,469	26.14%	25.40%	26.21%	25.78%	24.22%
Native American or Alaska Native alone (NH)	64	114	155	146	175	0.12%	0.18%	0.23%	0.18%	0.21%
Asian alone (NH)	184	285	406	894	1,175	0.33%	0.46%	0.60%	1.12%	1.39%
Native Hawaiian or Pacific Islander alone (NH)	x	x	32	74	92	x	x	0.05%	0.09%	0.11%
Other race alone (NH)	63	18	56	107	352	0.11%	0.03%	0.08%	0.13%	0.42%
Mixed race or Multiracial (NH)	x	x	623	1,152	2,913	x	x	0.92%	1.45%	3.45%
Hispanic or Latino (any race)	511	585	2,019	5,126	6,336	0.93%	0.94%	2.99%	6.44%	7.50%
Total	54,981	62,496	67,568	79,626	84,499	100.00%	100.00%	100.00%	100.00%	100.00%

=== 2020 census ===
As of the 2020 census, the county had a population of 84,499, 34,339 households, and 22,352 families residing in the county. The median age was 43.7 years; 21.3% of residents were under the age of 18 and 22.4% of residents were 65 years of age or older.

For every 100 females there were 88.6 males, and for every 100 females age 18 and over there were 85.3 males age 18 and over. 81.4% of residents lived in urban areas, while 18.6% lived in rural areas.

The racial makeup of the county was 64.2% White, 24.5% Black or African American, 0.4% American Indian and Alaska Native, 1.4% Asian, 0.1% Native Hawaiian and Pacific Islander, 3.7% from some other race, and 5.7% from two or more races. Hispanic or Latino residents of any race comprised 7.5% of the population.

There were 34,339 households in the county, of which 28.1% had children under the age of 18 living with them and 32.6% had a female householder with no spouse or partner present. About 28.8% of all households were made up of individuals and 13.3% had someone living alone who was 65 years of age or older.

There were 42,156 housing units, of which 18.5% were vacant. Among occupied housing units, 63.5% were owner-occupied and 36.5% were renter-occupied. The homeowner vacancy rate was 2.3% and the rental vacancy rate was 12.2%.

=== 2015 ===
In terms of European ancestry, 40.8% were English, 10.6% were "American", 10.2% were Irish, and 7.9% were German.

== Education ==
Glynn County's public schools are operated by Glynn County School System.

== Superfund sites ==
Glynn County is home to four Superfund sites. Those include the LCP Chemicals Georgia site, the Brunswick Wood Preserving site, the Hercules 009 Landfill site, and the Terry Creek Dredge Spoil Areas/Hercules Outfall site.

The Hanlin Group, Inc., which maintained a facility named LCP Chemicals in Glynn County just outside the corporate limits of Brunswick, was convicted of dumping 150 tons of mercury into Purvis Creek, a tributary of the Turtle River, and surrounding tidal marshes between the mid-1980s and its closure in 1994. Three executives were sentenced to prison time over the incident.

The LCP facility had been declared a Superfund site when it closed in 1994. It had been under scrutiny by the EPA after agency biologists discovered mercury poisoning in endangered wood storks on St. Simons Island. Fish, shellfish, crabs, and shrimps taken in coastal waters, as well as other bird species, also contained the toxic metal. The Service traced the source of the contamination to the LCP plant and documented the extent of the damage to wildlife resources. Their effort resulted in the addition of Endangered Species Act charges to those that would be brought against Hanlin and its officers.

== Crime ==
In 2020, the Federal Bureau of Investigation ranked the Brunswick metropolitan area (which includes the counties of Glynn, Brantley and McIntosh) as the seventh most dangerous metropolitan area in the state of Georgia.

On August 29, 2009, Glynn County resident Guy Heinze Jr. murdered eight members of his extended family including his father, Guy Heinze Sr. in the family's trailer in New Hope Plantation Mobile Home Park near Brunswick. Two others were critically injured, with one dying later in a hospital in Savannah. Heinze Jr. avoided the death penalty and was sentenced to life in prison without parole on October 30, 2013.

== Politics ==
As of the 2020s, Glynn County is a Republican stronghold, voting 64.5% for Donald Trump in 2024. Similar to Southeast Georgia, Glynn County is heavily Republican, having last voted Democratic in 1980, when the Democratic nominee was Georgia native Jimmy Carter. Democratic strength is concentrated in Brunswick, while the rural parts of Glynn County lean more Republican.

For elections to the United States House of Representatives, Glynn County is part of Georgia's 1st congressional district, currently represented by Buddy Carter. For elections to the Georgia State Senate, Glynn County is part of District 3. For elections to the Georgia House of Representatives, Glynn County is covered by districts 167, 179 and 180.

United States presidential election results for Glynn County, Georgia
Year	Republican		Democratic		Third party(ies)	
Year	No.	%	No.	%	No.	%
1912	16	3.21%	470	94.19%	13	2.61%
1916	36	6.45%	477	85.48%	45	8.06%
1920	132	23.83%	422	76.17%	0	0.00%
1924	283	29.18%	612	63.09%	75	7.73%
1928	799	59.27%	549	40.73%	0	0.00%
1932	186	12.81%	1,262	86.91%	4	0.28%
1936	260	11.88%	1,925	87.98%	3	0.14%
1940	274	11.94%	2,014	87.76%	7	0.31%
1944	385	16.18%	1,995	83.82%	0	0.00%
1948	1,090	23.80%	2,444	53.36%	1,046	22.84%
1952	2,575	43.47%	3,348	56.53%	0	0.00%
1956	3,098	50.22%	3,071	49.78%	0	0.00%
1960	2,926	44.95%	3,584	55.05%	0	0.00%
1964	7,341	56.22%	5,712	43.75%	4	0.03%
1968	3,725	30.24%	3,251	26.39%	5,341	43.36%
1972	9,443	75.88%	3,002	24.12%	0	0.00%
1976	5,403	36.35%	9,459	63.65%	0	0.00%
1980	7,214	47.54%	7,540	49.69%	419	2.76%
1984	11,724	64.07%	6,574	35.93%	0	0.00%
1988	11,126	63.18%	6,339	35.99%	146	0.83%
1992	11,242	49.02%	8,581	37.42%	3,109	13.56%
1996	12,305	56.96%	8,058	37.30%	1,239	5.74%
2000	14,346	64.09%	7,778	34.75%	260	1.16%
2004	18,608	67.08%	8,962	32.31%	169	0.61%
2008	20,479	61.31%	12,676	37.95%	248	0.74%
2012	20,893	59.33%	13,976	39.69%	348	0.99%
2016	21,512	62.47%	11,775	34.19%	1,150	3.34%
2020	25,617	61.00%	15,882	37.82%	495	1.18%
2024	27,558	62.76%	16,144	36.76%	210	0.48%

United States Senate election results for Glynn County, Georgia2
Year	Republican		Democratic		Third party(ies)	
Year	No.	%	No.	%	No.	%
2020	25,560	61.64%	14,938	36.02%	970	2.34%
2020	23,476	62.68%	13,976	37.32%	0	0.00%

United States Senate election results for Glynn County, Georgia3
Year	Republican		Democratic		Third party(ies)	
Year	No.	%	No.	%	No.	%
2020	11,810	28.97%	7,272	17.84%	21,686	53.19%
2020	23,448	62.65%	13,981	37.35%	0	0.00%
2022	20,735	62.56%	11,812	35.64%	597	1.80%
2022	18,900	62.33%	11,423	37.67%	0	0.00%

Georgia Gubernatorial election results for Glynn County
Year	Republican		Democratic		Third party(ies)	
Year	No.	%	No.	%	No.	%
2022	22,245	66.84%	10,779	32.39%	255	0.77%

== See also ==
- Glynn County Police Department
- National Register of Historic Places listings in Glynn County, Georgia
- List of counties in Georgia
