= Turtle River (Georgia) =

Coordinates: 31°07′01″N 81°29′29″W

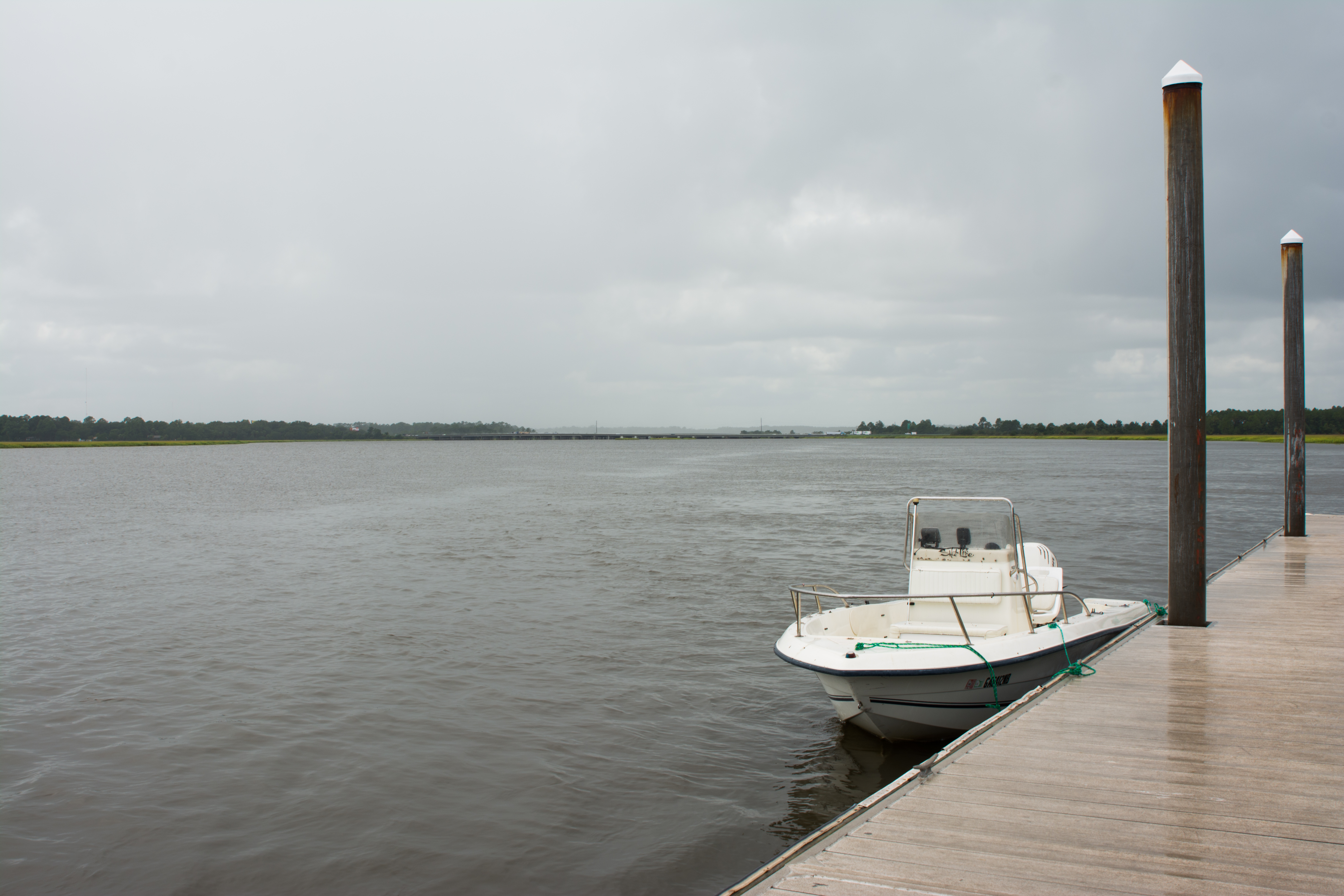
- Turtle River

Location
- Country: United States
- US state: Georgia

Physical characteristics
- Length: 17.6 miles (28.3 km)

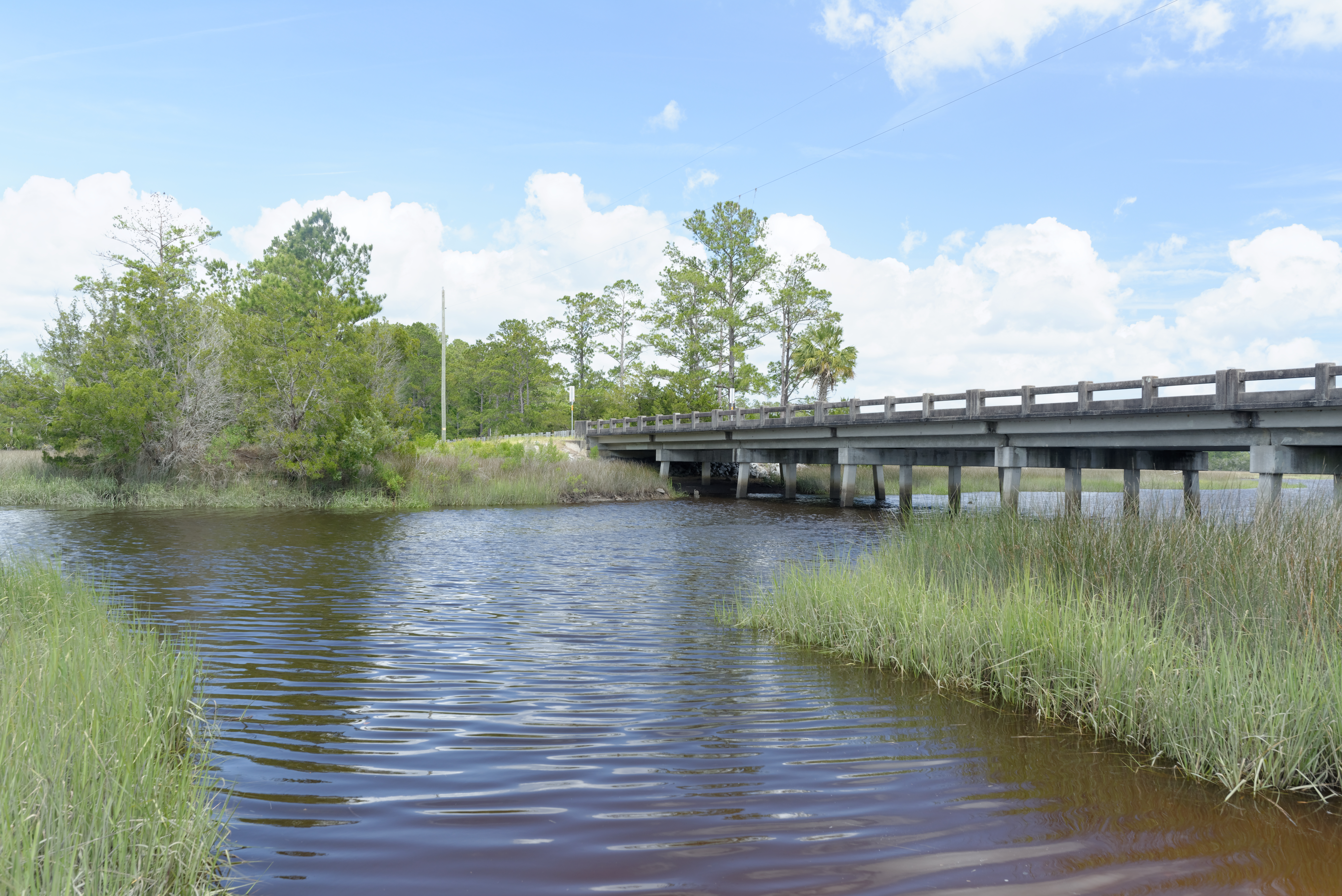
Georgia Route 99 over Turtle River

The Turtle River is a 17.6-mile-long (28.3 km) tidal river in the vicinity of Brunswick in Glynn County, Georgia. It is the main tributary of the Brunswick River.

The stream headwaters are in the Turtle River Swamp adjacent to the community of Georgetown and Georgia State Route 99. The stream flows southeast and east passing under I-95 just prior to its confluence with the Brunswick River along the south side of Brunswick, Georgia.

The mouth of the Turtle River is located adjacent to the Port of Brunswick. The river has an average depth of 23 ft. with some depths over 35 ft. The Turtle River is part of the Brunswick River Delta, which consists of dozens of small tributaries, some of which are navigable rivers (such as the Turtle River) and some of which are small streams and swamps that are rich with fish, white shrimp and coastal wildlife.

== See also ==
- List of rivers of Georgia
