= List of Atlanta broadcast stations by location =

The following broadcast stations in the Atlanta metropolitan area have antennas on the named building or tower or within 100 meters (330 feet) of the summit of the mountain, and are listed with call sign, frequency (or channel), city of license, and licensee (owner).

== Mountains ==
=== Sweat Mountain ===
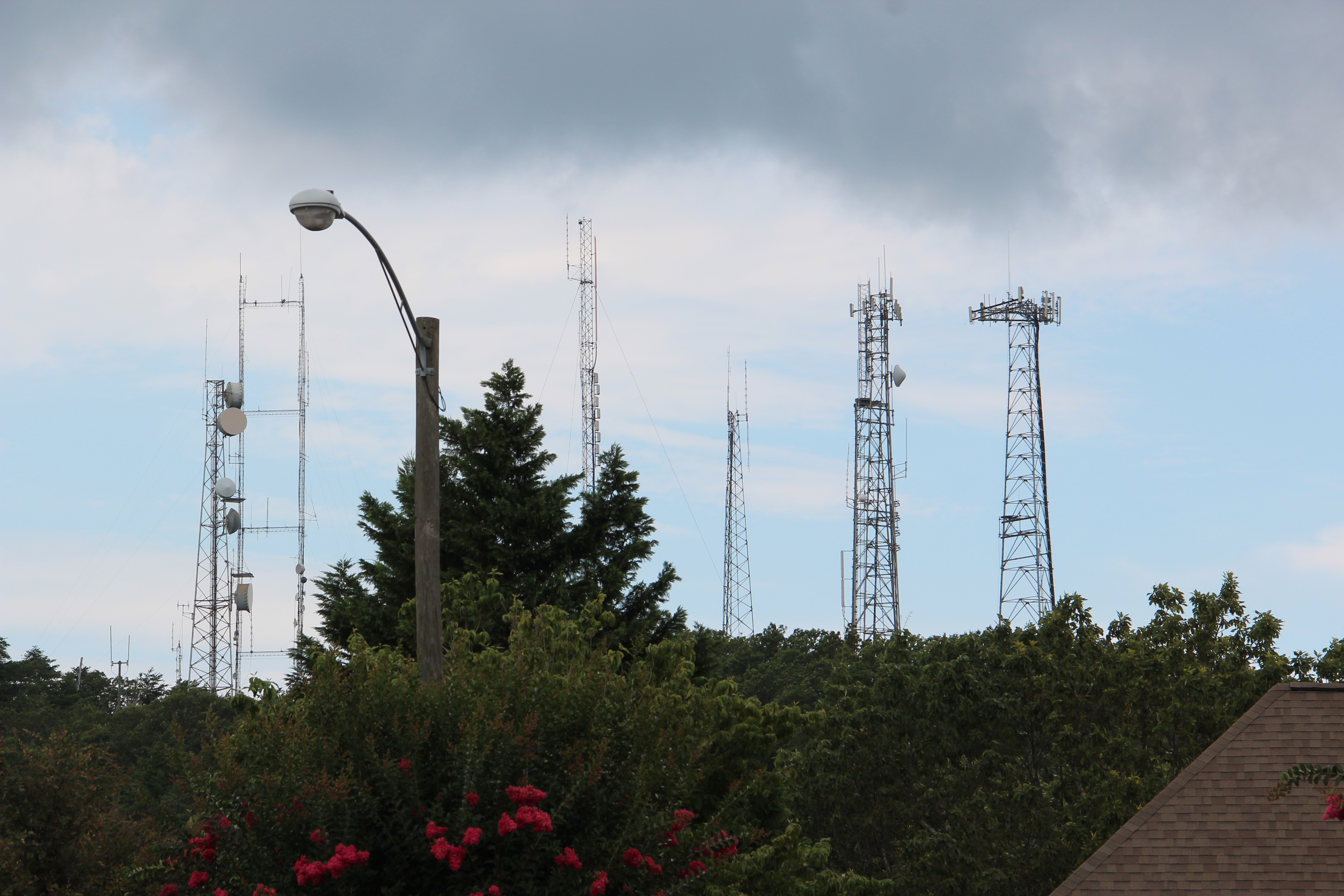
Sweat Mountain antenna farm

Sweat Mountain has a small antenna farm, on the highest point in metro Atlanta which is not protected as a park, at a summit elevation of 1,640 feet (500 m) 34°4′1″N 84°27′20″W:

- WBZY (105.7 MHz in Canton), iHeartMedia
- W265AV (100.9 in Woodstock) relays WCCV (91.7).
- W201DM (88.1 in Woodstock, licensed in 2014) relays KAWZ from Calvary Chapel of Twin Falls, Idaho.
- WATC-DT 41 (DTV 57.1/57.2 and former analog channel 57), Atlanta, Community Television

Long-standing applications are on file for broadcast translators from Calvary Chapel on 94.5 and 103.7 to serve Woodstock. Another application for a translator on 102.1 by Community Public Radio to serve "Sweat Mountain" (not a community) is also listed by the Federal Communications Commission.

A 50 kW transmitter on former TV channel 55 existed for MediaFLO, a pay-TV service available on mobile TV. Part of a single-frequency network (SFN) across the metropolitan area which used the regional call sign WPZA237, it was 26 meters (85 ft) above ground level of about 1,620 feet (490 m) at 34°3′59″N 84°27′14″W on a tower separate from the above-listed stations above. Another transmitter on channel 56 is licensed to Manifest Wireless (EchoStar, similar to Dish Network) in the same manner: an SFN with seven other locations in metro Atlanta with the call sign WQJY980, using a separate tower (at the same coordinates as MediaFLO) from the mountain's other broadcast stations.

=== Stone Mountain ===
East of Atlanta, it is owned by the state as part of the privately run Stone Mountain Park 33°48′21.4″N 84°8′43.5″W:

- WGTV, TV 8, Georgia Public Broadcasting
- KEC80 162.550, NOAA Weather Radio from NWSFO Peachtree City
- W266BW FM 101.1 Winder (construction permit), assigned to retransmit WSTR FM 94.1
- W296BB FM 107.1 Jonesboro (application), circumvents prohibition on retransmitting WTSH-FM 107.1 by using WSB-FM 98.5 HD3; on WSB-TV tower
- WX4GPB 144.960, 440.700, 1282.60, 1297.625, D-STAR amateur radio repeaters
- W4BOC 146.760 amateur radio repeater

=== Kennesaw Mountain ===
The federal, state and county governments and Cobb Electric Membership Corporation (Cobb EMC) maintain non-broadcast facilities for internal communications on Kennesaw Mountain. Its summit is 550 metres above sea level (MASL, 1,808 feet), the highest point in the metropolitan area.

=== Bear Mountain ===
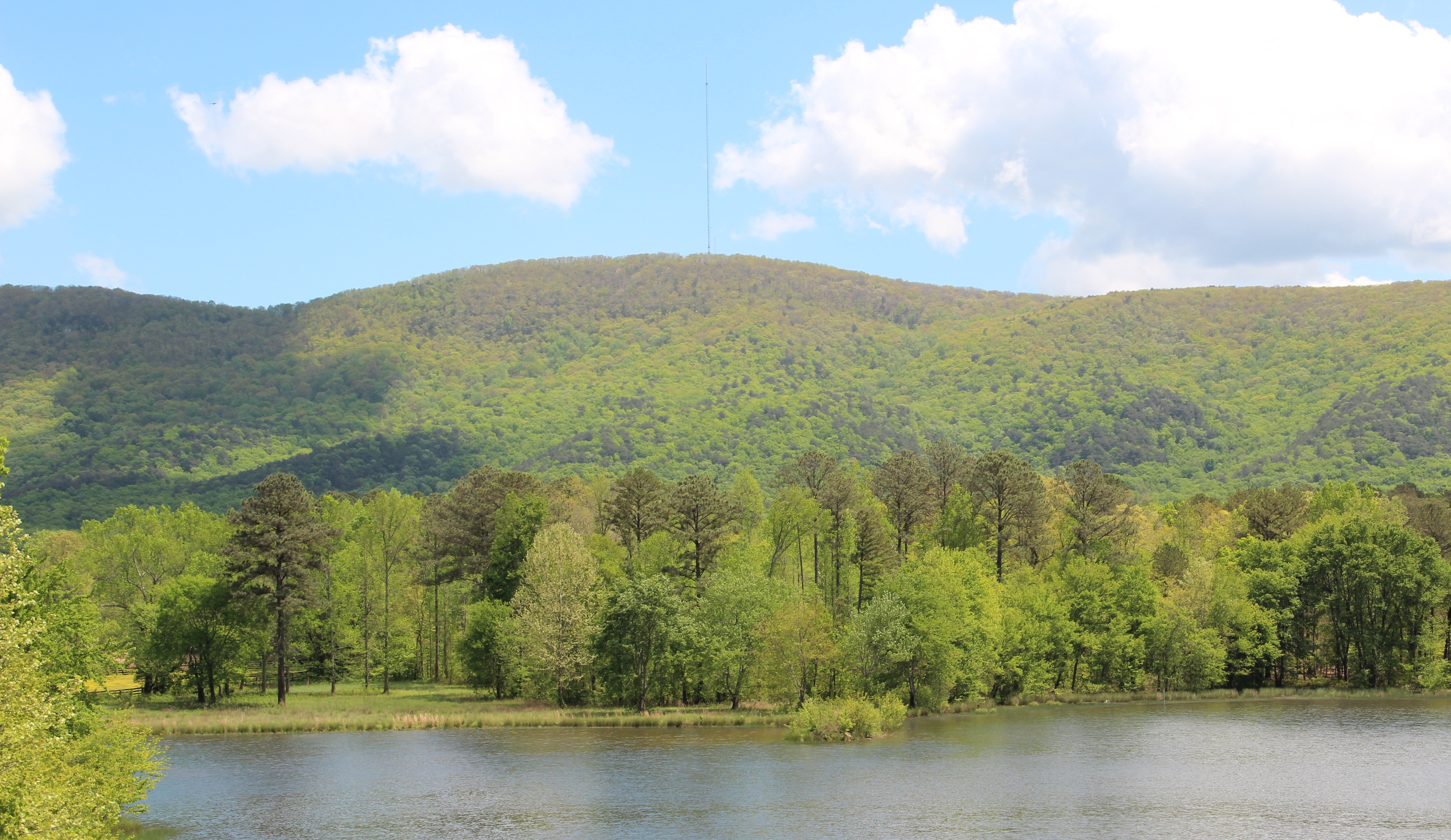
Bear Mountain

Near Waleska and Lake Arrowhead, Bear Mountain is the highest point in the greater metro area at 2,297 feet (700 MASL) 34°18′48″N 84°38′55″W:

- WPXA-TV 31 (Rome): Paxson Communications
- W213BV 90.5 White (formerly W214AS 90.7 Waleska) relays KAWZ.
- City of license and former location of WCHK-FM 105.5 Canton (now WBZY 105.7 Canton)

=== Blackjack Mountain ===
- Remote pickup units for local television-station electronic news-gathering
- XM Satellite Radio repeater

=== Sawnee Mountain ===
Sawnee Mountain is near Cumming.

- WWEV-FM 91.5

== Buildings ==
=== Westin Peachtree Plaza Hotel ===
The Westin Peachtree Plaza Hotel (33°45′34″N 84°23′19″W) was Atlanta's tallest when it was built.

- Original main transmitter for WUPA TV 69
- Original main transmitter and current allotment and backup for WZGC FM 92.9
- Original location of WSTR FM 94.1
- WNNX FM 100.5 College Park (previously WWWQ)
- WTHC-LD 42 (3.1 digital)
- XM Satellite Radio repeater

=== Bank of America Plaza ===
Bank of America Plaza (33°46′15″N 84°23′10″W), which replaced the Westin as Atlanta's tallest building, has the W4DOC 146.820 MHz amateur radio repeater.

=== SunTrust Plaza ===
SunTrust Plaza (One Peachtree Center, 33°45′45″N 84°23′14″W) is Atlanta's second-tallest skyscraper.

- WDTA-LD 35 (53.1)

=== Perimeter Center ===
Perimeter Center in Dunwoody, on the border with Sandy Springs, is atop 1050 Crown Pointe, a low-rise building.

- WAMJ FM 107.5 Roswell (backup); main station moved to Norcross in 2011.

== Towers ==
=== Turner Broadcasting tower ===
Adjacent to the Downtown Connector and owned by Turner Broadcasting System, the 1,031-foot (314 m) three-leg, self-supporting radio tower stood on land owned by Comcast. Its city block is bordered by Spring Street on the west, West Peachtree Street on the east, 10th Street on the south, and the former 11th Street (now part of the Turner campus) on the north. The adjacent building was gutted (except for the transmitter room), and the tower was scheduled for demolition within 120 days of the June 12, 2009 digital television transition. By August 2010 the tower was only beginning to be disassembled, however, and dismantling was completed by November 2010.

=== North Druid Hills ===
North Druid Hills (also known as the Richland tower site) has two guyed towers west-northwest of the end of Clifton Road at Briarcliff Road, near Emory University and the Centers for Disease Control and Prevention. WAGA-TV 27 (5.1) is just south on Briarcliff Road, across the south fork of Peachtree Creek.

East tower:

- WUVM-LD 4
- W13DQ-D 45 Atlanta and former W24AL-D digital permit, Ventana Television (Home Shopping Network)
- WANN-CD 29 (32.x) Atlanta, digital license, Prism Broadcasting
- WDWW-LD 28 Cleveland, digital permit, analog nearly 100 miles away
- WLVO-LD 26 Cumming
- WTBS-LD 6 Atlanta
- WPCH-TV 20 (17.1) Atlanta
- WATL TV 25 (36.1) Atlanta, and former analog 36
- WUVG-DT 48 (34.x) Athens
- WHSG-TV 44 (63.x) Monroe
- WANF 19 (46.x) Atlanta
- WUPA 43 (69.x) Atlanta
- WRFG FM 89.3 Atlanta
- WCLK FM 91.9 Atlanta
- Diplexed antenna at 340m:
  - WZGC FM 92.9 Atlanta
  - WWWQ FM 99.7 Atlanta
- Diplexed antenna at 330m:
  - WUBL FM 94.9 Atlanta
  - WWPW FM 96.1 Atlanta
  - WKHX-FM 101.5 Marietta
- Diplexed antenna at 303m:
  - W250BC 97.9 Riverdale: Translator for WNNX FM 100.5 within its service area; Cumulus Media
  - W255CJ 98.9 Atlanta: Translator for WWWQ FM 99.7 within its service area; Cumulus Media
  - W229AG 93.7 Atlanta: Translator for WCNN AM 680 within its service area; Dickey Broadcasting
- Diplexed antenna at 268m: W290AS FM 93.3 Bainbridge relays WCFO AM 1160 East Point

West tower:

- WANF 19 (46.1) Atlanta
- WKHX-FM 101.5 Marietta, backup and allotment

One tower has an XM Satellite Radio repeater.

=== Edgewood, Kirkwood ===
South of DeKalb Avenue and east of Moreland Avenue (U.S. Route 23 and Georgia 42) are three towers. Two are next to each other at the east end of New Street (a dead end) near Edgewood, and one is at the south end of Arizona Avenue (a dead end) near Kirkwood.

New Street, northeast (painted) tower:

- WABE FM 90.1 Atlanta, application for greater height, Atlanta Board of Education
- WSTR FM 94.1 Smyrna, Entercom
- WSB-FM 98.5 Atlanta, main and allotment, Cox Radio
- WSBB-FM 95.5 Atlanta, main and allotment, Cox Radio
- WVEE FM 103.3 Atlanta, main and backup, Entercom
- WZGC FM 92.9 Atlanta, backup only, Entercom

New Street, southwest (unpainted) tower:

- WABE-TV DTV 21 (30.1) Atlanta, digital only, Atlanta Board of Education
- WABE FM 90.1 Atlanta, Atlanta Board of Education

Arizona Avenue tower: WXIA-TV 10 (11.x) Atlanta, Gannett

=== Inman Park ===
Inman Park is between Interstate 20 and Memorial Drive east of Boulevard, at the south end of Cabbagetown and west of Peoplestown

- WRAS-FM 88.5 Atlanta, moved in 2015 from the former site off I-285 in Panthersville
- WHSG-TV 44 (63.x) Monroe
- WIRE-CD 40 (40.x) Atlanta
- WYGA-CD 16 (16.x) Atlanta, digital permit for 18
- W275BK FM 102.9 Decatur, permit issued in January 2010 to move from Edgewood
- Backup antenna for WUBL FM 94.9 and WWPW FM 96.1
- WQJY980, ATSC-M/H transmitter for Manifest Wireless mobile DTV on former TV channel 56
- W233BF FM 94.5 Social Circle, application made in March 2012 to move from north of Conyers

=== Freedom Parkway ===
The tower is so close to Freedom Parkway that one of its three sets of guy wires goes over the road, which is protected from falling ice in winter.

- WSB-TV 39 (2.x) Atlanta
- W296BB FM 107.1: Relays WTSH FM 107.1 via WSB-FM 98.5 HD-3.

=== Holly Springs ===
Holly Springs is bounded by Interstate 575 on the west, old Georgia 5 on the east, and Rabbit Hill Road on the south.

- Mobile phone base stations, halfway up

=== Others ===
- WREK FM 91.1 Atlanta, on the Georgia Institute of Technology campus
- Cox Radio guyed tower west of Braselton, WSRV FM 97.1 Gainesville, special temporary authority for WSB-TV translator on 46
- WBZW FM 96.7 Peachtree City, and WHTA FM 107.9 Hampton, guyed tower north of Tyrone
- WALR-FM 104.1 and WRDG FM 105.3, broadcast from two towers off U.S. 27 Alt / Georgia 16 northwest of Newnan
- Cobb EMC tower in Marietta, W222AF 92.3 Marietta, relays WAKL FM 106.7
- FCC monitoring station in Powder Springs, about one mile south of Highway 6 on the Cobb-Paulding County border
