= WTSH-FM =

Coordinates: 34.251°N 84.985°W

Satellite of WLKQ-FM, Buford
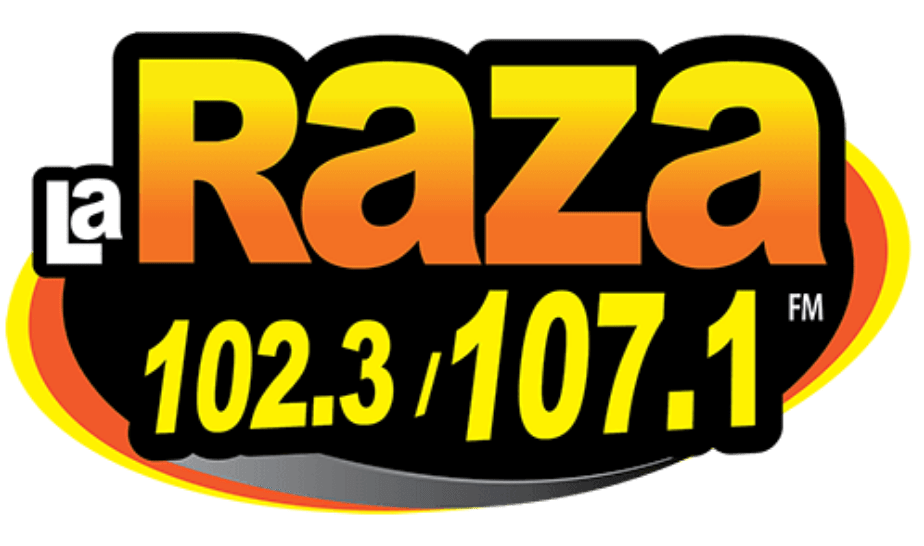
- Aragon, Georgia; United States
- Broadcast area: Northwest Georgia (Rome–metro Atlanta
- Frequency: 107.1 MHz
- Branding: La Raza 102.3/107.1

Programming
- Format: Regional Mexican

Ownership
- Owner: Davis Broadcasting (via LMA); (Woman's World Broadcasting)

History
- First air date: 1972
- Former call signs: WZOT (1972–1989)
- Call sign meaning: Transfiguration of "South" 107, which it was known as until June 2014

Technical information
- Licensing authority: FCC
- Facility ID: 7043
- Class: C1
- ERP: 100,000 watts
- HAAT: 158 m (518 ft)

Links
- Public license information: Public file; LMS
- Webcast: Listen Live
- Website: laraza1023.com

WTSH-FM 107.1, branded as La Raza 102.3/107.1, is an FM radio station in northwest Georgia, and reaching into northwest metro Atlanta, Georgia. Originally assigned to Rockmart, its city of license is now Aragon, west-northwest of Atlanta, and east of Rockmart. The broadcast licensee is Woman's World Broadcasting and operated by Rome Radio Partners, LLC. From June 23, 2014 to September 24, 2018, it was operated by Cox Media Group via a local marketing agreement (LMA). The station's supposed main studio is located on John Davenport Drive in Rome, Georgia.

On June 9, 2014, Women's World Broadcasting announced it would turn over operation of country music "South 107" to Cox Media Group via an LMA. On June 22 of that year, WTSH ended its country format after over 25 years and began stunting with a liner redirecting listeners to WSRM FM as "South 93.5". On June 23, Cox Media Group started to assume control of 107.1 via LMA. Upon Cox taking over at midnight, 107.1 then flipped to alternative rock as X107.1, similar to the then-recently launched "X107.3" in Orlando, Florida. The first song on X107.1 was Fever by The Black Keys. Despite mostly covering outside of the Atlanta metro area (even with the "translator" station's coverage included), it identifies itself entirely as an Atlanta station during on-air promos. The station ID included all three stations at the top of each hour: "WTSH-FM Aragon, W296BB Jonesboro, WSB-FM HD3 Atlanta".

Just over a year later, on June 29, 2015, WTSH went back to their heritage country format, simulcasting WNGC as 106.1/107.1 Your Georgia Country. The change comes as X107.1 failed to gain any traction up against WRDA/WRDG generating only a 0.5 share in the May 2015 Nielsen Audio ratings.

On September 24, 2018, WTSH-FM (as a result of the LMA with Cox Media Group ending) switched from a simulcast with country-formatted WNGC to a simulcast with regional Mexican-formatted WLKQ-FM in Buford, branded as "La Raza 102.3/107.1".

The LMA and the "translator" station allowed Cox to circumvent restrictions on the excessive concentration of media ownership in the Atlanta media market. Since the "translator" station is not attributable under the FCC rules, and the main station's official service contour does not overlap Cox's WSRV FM 97.1 to the northeast or that of Cox's WALR-FM 104.1 to the southwest, it allows Cox to exceed the cap through technicalities and loopholes. Locally, Cox also owns WSB AM 750 and its simulcast on WSBB-FM 95.5, as well as WSB-FM 98.5, WSB-TV 39 (2.1 and 2.2), and the Atlanta Journal-Constitution.

== Broadcast translators and station move ==
WTSH-FM currently broadcasts with 100,000 watts from west-central Bartow County near Kingston, Georgia. In early May 2012, it applied to move to the WCCV FM 91.7 tower on Mullinax Mountain between Euharlee and Wax, Georgia, due west of Cartersville and southeast of Rome. This application was later dropped, and another filed in later July 2013 was for another location further southwest near Taylorsville, north-northwest of Rockmart. (Relative to metro Atlanta, this is two counties due west of Acworth.) As of February 2014, this application was still pending.

WTSH's owner also purchased broadcast translator W296BB, also on 107.1, but licensed to serve Jonesboro, and previously rebroadcasting WMVV FM 90.7 within its own coverage area (with no terrain obstructions that would make such a translator necessary). It is now assigned to retransmit WSB-FM 98.5, indicating that HD3 digital subchannel now simulcasts WTSH, providing a legal fiction for circumventing the FCC rules which prohibit a translator or booster of a commercial radio station from reaching outside the main station's legal broadcast range. A construction permit issued for W296BB allowed it to move to the WSB-TV 39 (DTV 2.1 & 2.2) TV tower over Freedom Parkway just east of downtown Atlanta, increasing it from 13 to the maximum 250 watts, and using a directional antenna with a major null toward the northwest so as to reduce RF interference to WTSH. It went on-air in February 2014, making it at least the second station to be taken from Clayton county to retransmit another commercial station with an already-good signal in the area (the other being W275BK FM 102.9 from Riverdale).

The two stations are synchronized as a single-frequency network, the same way a booster station would be. This means that the stations transmit the same audio at exactly the same time, intended to make for a nearly seamless transition for listeners. The main indication is static, most often occurring around southeastern Cobb county, near the Chattahoochee River and the northwestern part of the Perimeter (I-285 around Atlanta). This is due to the two stations being around the same signal strength in this area, and the numerous hills, which causes the relative levels of the two to rapidly oscillate back and forth (picket-fencing) when travelling at freeway speeds. Slower speeds or stationary listening may actually be more difficult, as the listener is stuck in small pockets of poor reception for longer periods. The zone of RF interference moves hourly and daily based on weather and overnight temperature inversions, which affect radio propagation, especially over the longer distance from the main station. The two stations may also have their actual carrier waves synchronized via GPS for further stability, and to avoid phase cancellation, but as a matter of physics it is impossible to avoid the switching caused by FM's capture effect.

In 2003, an application was made for another translator station in Rome on 98.7 by Broadcast Investment Associates. This station, which took the FCC a decade to approve, received a construction permit in December 2013, after a reapplication four months prior. Given broadcast callsign W254CF, it also listed WTSH-FM as its primary station, and still shows a location with the city limits just northwest of downtown Rome along Martha Berry Highway (U.S. 27 and Georgia 1). Previously illegal to retransmit a non-FM station, W254CF is now directly assigned to simulcast WRGA AM 1470, another Rome Radio Partners property.

WTSH previously had translator W269CC FM 101.7 in Adairsville, which now rebroadcasts WJTH AM 900 in Calhoun, both in upper northwest Georgia.

== Former disc jockeys ==
- Mornings: Moby in the Morning
- Middays: Monica
- Afternoons: Kevin Daniels
- Evenings: Rick Bradley
