= WSB =

WSB may refer to:

== Broadcasting ==
- WSB (AM), a radio station (750 AM) licensed to Atlanta, Georgia, United States
- WSB-FM, a radio station (98.5 FM) licensed to Atlanta, Georgia, United States
- WSB-TV, a television station (channel 32, virtual 2) licensed to Atlanta, Georgia, United States
- WSB-TV tower
- WSBB-FM, a radio simulcast of WSB (AM) (95.5 FM) licensed to Doraville, Georgia, United States

== People ==
- William Seward Burroughs I, inventor of a calculating machine
- William S. Burroughs, Beat generation writer and grandson of the above
- William S. Burroughs Jr., writer and son of the above

== Sports and games ==
- World Series Baseball (disambiguation), a video game series published by Sega
- World Series of Boxing
- World SuperBike, another name for the Superbike World Championship

== Other uses ==
- r/wallstreetbets, an investing subreddit on Reddit
- Weak Stability Boundary, a low energy transfer that allows spacecraft to change orbits using very little fuel
- World Scout Bureau, a division of the World Organization of the Scout Movement
- World Security Bureau, a fictional intelligence agency on the long-running soap opera General Hospital
- World System Builder, an organization functioning under Multi-level marketing company World Financial Group
- WSB Merito Universities, group of private universities in Poland
- WSB University in Dąbrowa Górnicza in Poland
- Wynental- und Suhrentalbahn, a former narrow gauge railway company in the canton of Aargau, Switzerland
