= WSTR (FM) =

- Smyrna, Georgia; United States
- Broadcast area: Atlanta metropolitan area
- Frequency: 94.1 MHz (HD Radio)
- Branding: Star 94

Programming
- Language: English
- Format: Hot adult contemporary
- Subchannels: HD2: Channel Q
- Affiliations: WXIA-TV

Ownership
- Owner: Audacy, Inc.; (Audacy License, LLC)
- Sister stations: WAOK; WVEE; WZGC

History
- First air date: January 1, 1964
- Former call signs: WDJK (1964–1967); WKXI (1967–1969); WQXI-FM (1969–1989)
- Call sign meaning: "Star"

Technical information
- Licensing authority: FCC
- Facility ID: 30822
- Class: C0
- ERP: 100,000 watts
- HAAT: 316 meters (1,037 ft)
- Transmitter coordinates: 33.7593°N 84.3346°W
- Translator: 100.9 W265AV (Woodstock)

Links
- Public license information: Public file; LMS
- Webcast: Listen live (via Audacy)
- Website: www.audacy.com/star94atlanta

WSTR (94.1 FM, "Star 94") is a radio station licensed to serve Smyrna, Georgia, owned by Audacy, Inc. It broadcasts a hot adult contemporary format, switching to Christmas music between Thanksgiving and Christmas Day. WSTR's studios are located at Colony Square in Midtown Atlanta, while its transmitter is located in Atlanta's Reynoldstown neighborhood.

== History ==
=== Early years ===
The station signed on as WDJK on January 1, 1964, founded by WSMA (1550 AM) owner Mitchell Melof; WDJK operated as a simulcast of WSMA.

Jupiter Broadcasting of Georgia, then the owner of WQXI (790 AM), purchased WDJK in January 1965, with Kent Burkhart serving as vice president and general manager. WDJK's call sign was changed to WKXI and a beautiful music format was installed, with studios at 2970 Peachtree Road NW in Atlanta. The Pacific and Southern Company, forerunners to the modern-day Gannett and Tegna Inc., purchased WQXI and WKXI in November 1967.

=== WQXI-FM (1969–1989) ===
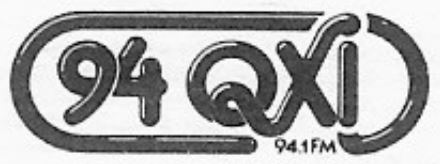
94Q logo, 1977-89

In 1969, the station changed its call letters to WQXI-FM to match its AM sister station. In mid-1977, the station started calling itself "94Q" when WQXI's contemporary hit radio format was moved to the FM station.

Around 1987, WQXI-FM's audience share began to dwindle. Various tweaks were made to the music mix, followed by an outright change of direction in late 1988 that competed head-to-head with then-dominant Top 40 outlet WAPW (99.7 FM) as "Atlanta's Hit Music, 94Q". Another CHR outlet, WZGC (92.9 FM), was already experiencing similar downfall at the time. However, by the following summer, 94Q had been soundly beaten, and the station began to purge most of its management and on-air talent.

WQXI-FM notably carried a smooth jazz-themed program called Jazz Flavors during the 1980s, first airing on Sunday evenings before eventually expanding to weeknights. Despite the seeming incompatibility between it and contemporary hits, this program ran on WQXI-FM for several years, eventually serving as the genesis for the "Jazz Flavors" branding on WJZF (104.1 FM) when that station became the first one in the Atlanta market to adopt the format full-time. "Jazz Flavors" was reduced back to Sunday nights only in March 1989, when 94Q was experimenting with a mainstream CHR format.

=== WSTR (1989–present) ===
At midnight on November 15, "94Q" signed off after 12 years, with the final song being "Imagine" by John Lennon. 94.1 would then relaunch as "Star 94" with the call letters WSTR. The first song on "Star 94" was "Oh Atlanta" by Little Feat. The station's format was a hybrid of hot AC and Top 40, best described as adult Top 40. The station initially avoided most hip-hop and rhythmic-oriented music hitting the Top 40 charts, though it added some rhythmic songs in the mid-1990s. Steve McCoy was brought in as morning show host and was paired with Vikki Locke; McCoy and Locke would helm the station's morning show for the next 17 years.

After WAPW flipped to modern rock as WNNX in October 1992, WSTR was considered the "default" hit music station in Atlanta due to the lack of a mainstream Top 40 outlet. Outside of a brief stint as a Top 40 when WBTS launched in 1999, Atlanta gained a mainstream Top 40 station in 2001, when WWWQ (100.5 FM) signed on.

==== Hot AC era (2010–2020) ====
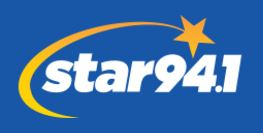
"Star" logo (2016–2020)

In September 2010, Nielsen BDS moved WSTR from the CHR/Top 40 panel to the adult Top 40 (hot AC) panel, as the station became more identified with a Hot AC playlist. WSTR changed its on-air slogan to "Your Life...Your Music", to emphasize its shift to hot AC. In February 2011, WSTR began programming all-1990s weekends, called "Big 90s Weekends" in response to the all-1980s weekends on WSB-FM (98.5). However, in the Fall of 2011, the station dropped the All-90s weekends.

Jefferson-Pilot Communications (and later Lincoln Financial Media) had owned WSTR and WQXI since 1974. On December 8, 2014, Entercom announced its purchase of Lincoln Financial Media's entire 15-station lineup, including WSTR and WQXI, for $106.5 million. The stations were operated under a local marketing agreement (LMA) until the sale was approved by the Federal Communications Commission (FCC). Entercom officially took over WSTR and WQXI on July 17, 2015; WQXI was spun off to Atlanta Radio Korea in 2016.

In November 2017, Entercom merged with CBS Radio, making WSTR co-owned with WZGC, WVEE-FM and WAOK.

In 2019, the station aired Christmas music during the holiday season for the first time.

==== Rhythmic AC era (2020–2025) ====
Logo under previous slogan

On September 17, 2020, the station began teasing a "big announcement" to come at 3 pm; the use of the word "big" seemed to allude to previous reports the station was soon to flip to adult hits as "Big 94" (matching a similar recent format change on cross-country sister station WBGB in Boston). At that time, after playing "Closing Time" by Semisonic, WSTR instead relaunched with a rhythmic adult contemporary format, maintaining the Star branding while promoting the new focus as "The NEW Star 94" under the slogan "The Rhythm of ATL", with the first song being "Wanna Be Startin' Somethin'" by Michael Jackson.

It was announced via Instagram on September 4, 2025, that Atlanta's beloved Kevin and Taylor morning show would be moving to WSTR. The announcement came 8 months after the shutdown of 104.7 the Fish.

On November 26, 2025, WSTR flipped to an all-Christmas music format. While they did weekends of all-Christmas music in 2024, the station had never before flipped to Holiday tunes full time. The station is the only full power station in Atlanta to flip to Christmas music. Prior to 2025, WFSH-FM (now WAIA) flipped to Christmas music every year. However, in 2024 they were bought by K-Love Inc. and now broadcast the Air1 radio network.

==== Variety Hits, switch to AC, then to Hot AC (2026–present) ====
Previous logo

Following the station's first full-time flip to Christmas music, Star 94 ownership segued its music mix to a Hot AC-leaning Variety Hits format, using a higher share of current-based pop music and 90s- and 2000s-era adult contemporary tracks, while scaling back its so-called "Feel Good Throwbacks" (rhythmic hits from the 90s and 2000s) to just a few tracks per hour.

Accompanying the switch, WSTR began using a new tagline: "Atlanta's Upbeat Variety." The format, unique to both the Atlanta market and radio nationally, has been cast as an updated, female-oriented variety hits format, with added core artists like Kelly Clarkson, Bruno Mars, Charlie Puth, Michael Jackson and Prince.

On July 10, 2026, WSTR shifted to a bright adult contemporary format, dropping most of its rhythmic titles in favor of a more balanced, mainstream pop direction to better complete with Cox Media Group's WSB-FM (B98.5). On September 8, 2026, over the preceding Labor Day weekend, WSTR further shifted its format, this time to hot adult contemporary.

== HD Radio ==
The HD2 digital subchannel formerly aired a classic hits format under the brand "Star 94.1 HD2".

The HD3 channel formerly aired Audacy's LGBTQ+ talk/dance format "Channel Q". It has since moved to the station's channel with the HD3 channel shut down.
