= WSB-TV tower =

Guyed mast broadcast tower in Atlanta, Georgia

Coordinates: 33.764444°N 84.361667°W

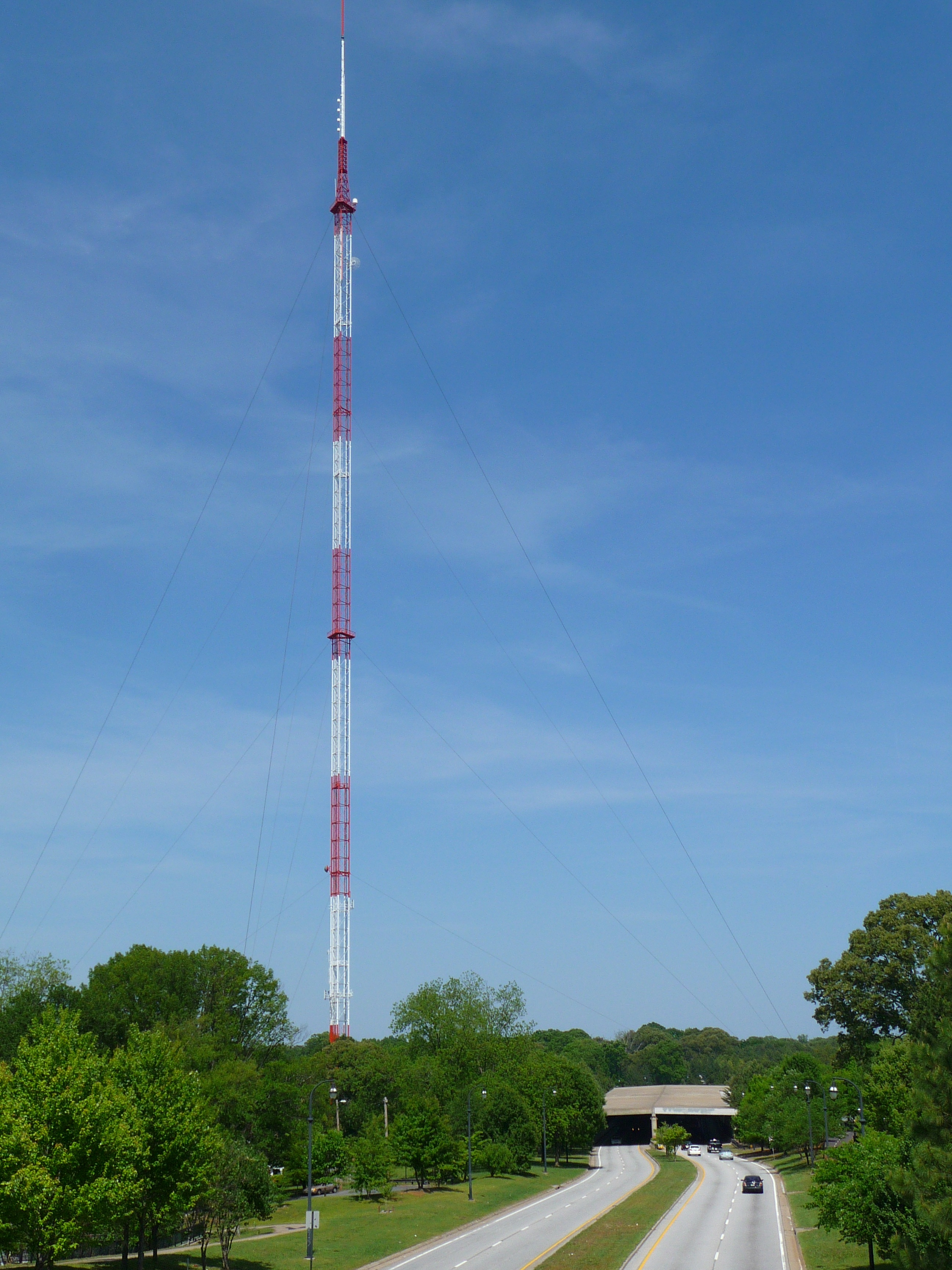
WSB-TV tower, and structure protecting Freedom Parkway

The WSB-TV tower is a 327.6-meter (1,075 ft) guyed mast broadcast tower in the Old Fourth Ward neighborhood of Atlanta, Georgia, immediately adjacent to Freedom Parkway and the Historic Fourth Ward Park skate park. The tower was built in 1950; 76 years ago, and at its completion was the tallest guyed mast tower in the United States. It has a triangular cross section.

This tower is so close to Freedom Parkway that one of its three sets of guy wires goes over the road, which was built under the tower system in the 1990s. To protect against falling ice during and after freezing rain in winter, the roadway is covered with a sturdy bridge-like structure at this point.

== Stations ==
The FCC lists the following FM and television stations at this location:

- WSB-TV 32 (2.x) Atlanta, and formerly VHF analog channel 2, owned and operated by Cox Media Group
- W296BB FM 107.1 "Jonesboro", a broadcast translator officially assigned to retransmit WSB-FM HD3 as a legal fiction to allow it to simulcast WTSH-FM 107.1 (also operated by Cox Radio) further east and southeast than it would otherwise be allowed

During the 2000s, the WSB-TV tower carried both the analog TV signal on VHF channel 2 (54 to 60 MHz) and the current digital TV signal on UHF (620 to 626 MHz). Following the DTV transition in the United States, which forced analog TV stations off-air in June 2009, the old antenna (larger due to the longer wavelength of lower carrier frequencies) was removed from the top, and the smaller UHF antenna moved in its place, improving its broadcast range slightly, due to the increase in height.

== See also ==
- WSB-FM and WSB-TV
- List of towers
- List of Atlanta broadcast stations by location
