= Terrana =

Terrana may refer to:

- Anna Terrana, Canadian politician
- Mike Terrana, American drummer
- Phil Terrana, better known as Steve McCoy, an American radio show host
- Ralph Terrana, record producer
- Russ Terrana, American recording engineer
- Terrana, a futuristic realm in the Xyber 9: New Dawn animated television series
