= WAOK =

- Atlanta, Georgia; United States
- Broadcast area: Atlanta metropolitan area
- Frequency: 1380 kHz
- Branding: News & Talk 1380 WAOK

Programming
- Language: English
- Format: Urban talk radio
- Affiliations: NBC News Radio

Ownership
- Owner: Audacy, Inc.; (Audacy License, LLC)
- Sister stations: WSTR; WVEE; WZGC

History
- First air date: 1928
- Former call signs: WRBI (1928–1931); WJTL (1931–1935); WATL (1935–1954)
- Call sign meaning: Atlanta OK (former owners of the station)

Technical information
- Licensing authority: FCC
- Facility ID: 63775
- Class: B
- Power: 25,000 watts (day); 4,200 watts (night)
- Transmitter coordinates: 33°45′39.4″N 84°28′41.7″W
- Repeater: 103.3 WVEE-HD3 (Atlanta)

Links
- Public license information: Public file; LMS
- Webcast: Listen live (via Audacy)
- Website: www.audacy.com/waok

WAOK (1380 AM) is a commercial radio station, owned by Audacy, Inc., in Atlanta, Georgia. WAOK broadcasts from studios at Colony Square in Midtown Atlanta. It is Atlanta's third-oldest continuously licensed broadcast station and the fifth oldest in Georgia.

WAOK is a Class B station. Its transmitter site is on Chalmers Drive, Northwest, in Atlanta, near the Ralph David Abernathy Freeway (Interstate 20). It operates with a power of 25,000 watts during the daytime, using a non-directional antenna. At night, when AM radio signals travel farther, in order to protect other stations on AM 1380 it reduces power to 4,200 watts and uses a directional antenna.

WAOK airs a talk radio format aimed at the African American community. It has local hosts in morning and afternoon drive time with the syndicated Rev. Al Sharpton Show heard in early afternoons. WAOK is also heard on the HD3 subchannel of sister station 103.3 WVEE.

== History ==
The station was first licensed, as WRBI, in early 1928 to Kents Furniture & Music Store in Tifton, Georgia. The original call sign was randomly assigned from a sequential roster of available call letters. It was changed to WJTL on June 1, 1931, and to WATL on November 25, 1935.

In June 1931 ownership was transferred to Oglethorpe University, broadcasting on 1370 kilocycles, with 100 watts. By 1940, the station was owned by the Atlanta Broadcasting Company and had its power increased to 250 watts. WATL was Atlanta's network affiliate for the Mutual Broadcasting System.

With the implementation of the North American Regional Broadcasting Agreement (NARBA) in 1941, the frequency was shifted to 1400 kHz, but the station still only transmitted with 250 watts. By contrast, AM 750 WSB was running the maximum power of 50,000 watts and AM 590 WAGA (now WDWD) was running 5,000 watts. In the 1940s, the station got Federal Communications Commission (FCC) permission to move to 1380 kHz. It increased its power to 5,000 watts around the clock, using a directional antenna after sunset to protect other stations on AM 1380.

=== WAOK R&B ===
On March 15, 1954, WATL changed its call sign to WAOK. It adopted a rhythm and blues and traditional black gospel music format. Featured performers included legendary R&B disc jockey Zenas "Daddy" Sears and local musician Piano Red, as well as early shock jock Alley Pat Patrick and singer Zilla Mays, the "Dream Girl", who broadcast sultry talk and soft music in the early-morning hours. The studios were moved from 201 Henry Grady Building to a new facility at 70 Houston Street, Northeast.

WAOK was acquired by The Atlanta OK Broadcasting Company in January 1956. Stan Raymond, Zenas Sears and Dorothy Lester each were one third owners. The AOK designation preceded the popular astronaut slang expression A-OK by many years.

=== Ray Charles concert ===
At a WAOK-sponsored concert held at Herndon Stadium in Atlanta on May 28, 1959, Sears used an Ampex monaural recorder and a single microphone to make one of the most famous live albums of its time, Ray Charles in Person (Atlantic 8039). The recording was unsolicited, but after Sears had listened to what he'd recorded, he sent the tape to Charles' label, Atlantic Records, which paid Sears royalties that put his twins through college. The recording is famous not only as a documentary of Ray Charles's music before he became a crossover star, but also for its technical excellence, capturing the band, the crowd, and the singer in balance.

The final song in the concert was the premiere of "What'd I Say." WAOK turned it into a hit even though there was no released version. Both "What'd I Say" and "Tell The Truth" had been recorded in the same session in New York City on February 18, 1959, but the album What'd I Say would not be released until October 19, 1959, and the studio version of "Tell The Truth" was never released until 2005 (Pure Genius: The Complete Atlantic Recordings 1952-1959.)

=== Changes in ownership ===
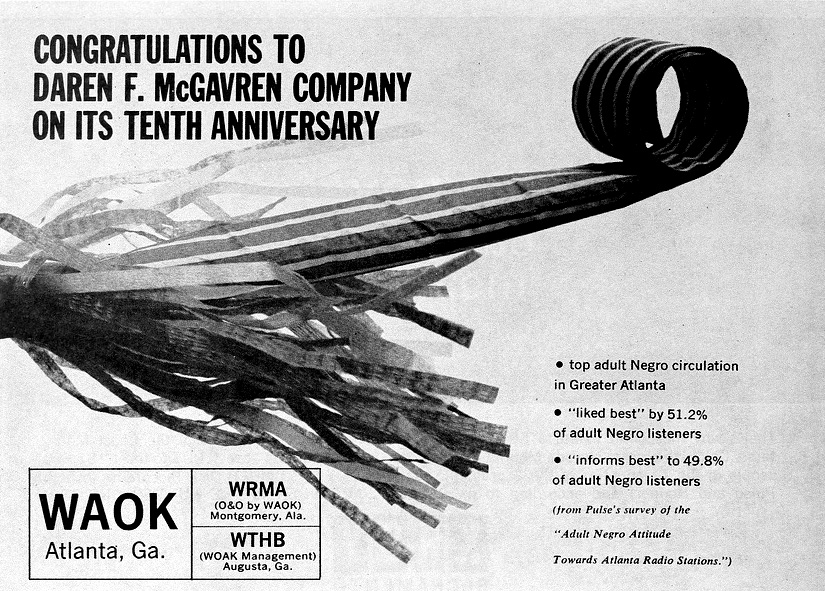
1962 station advertisement.

By 1957, the station was on the air 24 hours a day. The studios moved in 1959 to 110 Edgewood Road, Northeast, and the station's licensee name was changed to the WAOK Broadcasting Company. It changed in 1962 to The Atlanta OK Broadcasting Company.

On November 29, 1963, Stan Raymond and Zenas Sears became fifty percent owners of WAOK's licensee, acquiring the late Dorothy Lester's 33% interest for $57,786 from a local bank serving as the executor of her estate. The studios were moved to new quarters at 75 Piedmont Road.

The FCC granted approval for the sale of the station on April 1, 1974, to Broadcast Enterprise Network, Inc. Ragan Augustus Henry, a Philadelphia attorney, headed the new organization as President and 53% owner. He founded BENI (Broadcast Enterprises National, Inc.) in 1974 as a Black-owned business venture. BENI took control of the station May 14, 1974. In late May 1982, studios and offices were relocated to 401 West Peachtree Street.

On July 9, 1985, WAOK was sold again, this time to the DKM Broadcasting Corporation. DKM (Dyson Kissner-Moran) sold Atlanta's AM 590 WPLO (now WDWD) to buy WAOK. That paired WAOK with Urban Contemporary FM station 103.3 WVEE, which DKM also owned. In the summer of 1985, WAOK revamped its programming format. It now aired R&B music with gospel music heard early weekday mornings and on Sundays. The studios were then moved to 120 Ralph McGill Blvd.

On January 1, 1988, all DKM-owned properties were sold for $200 million, including stations in Denver, Baltimore, Akron, Dayton and Dallas, as well as WAOK and WVEE in Atlanta. The buyer was the Summit Communications Group, Inc. While WVEE concentrated on Urban Contemporary music, WAOK became a full-time gospel music station.

In March 1995, Summit sold its interests in WAOK and WVEE to Granum Communications, Inc. (Herbert W. McCord, Peter Ferrara, and Michael Weinstein).

=== CBS and Entercom ===
On March 15, 1996, Granum Communications sold WAOK and WVEE to Infinity Broadcasting, a division of CBS Radio. Infinity already owned 92.9 WZGC, that gave Infinity a triopoly in the Atlanta media market. On December 26, 2001, WAOK switched from urban contemporary gospel to a talk radio format aimed at the African American community in Atlanta. Tony Brown was named Program Director of the "New WAOK—The Voice of the Community."

On February 2, 2017, CBS Radio announced it would merge with Entercom. The merger was approved on November 9, 2017, and was consummated on the 17th.

=== Expanded Band assignment ===
On March 17, 1997, the FCC announced that 88 stations had been given permission to move to newly available "Expanded Band" transmitting frequencies, ranging from 1610 to 1700 kHz, with WAOK authorized to move from 1380 to 1650 kHz. A construction permit for the expanded band station was assigned the callsign WAZJ on March 23, 1998. However this station was never built, and its construction permit was cancelled on January 15, 2004.

== Notable hosts ==
- Bill Campbell
- Rob Redding

== See also ==
- Ray Charles in Person (Atlantic 8039; Liner notes by Zenas Sears)
