= WAIA (FM) =

Air1 radio station in Atlanta, Georgia, United States

- Athens, Georgia; United States
- Broadcast area: Metro Atlanta
- Frequency: 104.7 MHz (HD Radio)
- Branding: Air1

Programming
- Language: English
- Format: Contemporary worship music
- Subchannels: HD2: Contemporary Christian music "K-Love Pop"; HD3: Spanish contemporary worship music "Air1"
- Network: Air1

Ownership
- Owner: Educational Media Foundation
- Sister stations: WAKL

History
- First air date: January 1964
- Former call signs: WDOL-FM (1964–1974); WJSR (1974–1976); WAGQ (1976–1989); WALR (1989–1995); WALR-FM (1995–2000); WFSH-FM (2000–2025)
- Call sign meaning: Air1 Atlanta

Technical information
- Licensing authority: FCC
- Facility ID: 56390
- Class: C1
- ERP: 24,000 watts
- HAAT: 505 meters (1,657 ft)
- Transmitter coordinates: 33.867°N 83.829°W

Links
- Public license information: Public file; LMS
- Webcast: Listen live
- Website: www.air1.com

WAIA (104.7 MHz, "Air1") is a non-commercial FM radio station licensed to Athens, Georgia, and serving Metro Atlanta. The station is owned by the Educational Media Foundation. It airs EMF's contemporary worship music network Air1.

The transmitter is on the tallest radio tower in Georgia, located off Piney Grove Road in Loganville, about 30 miles (50 km) east of Atlanta. The height above average terrain (HAAT) of this tower allows the station to better penetrate office buildings in Atlanta. The effective radiated power (ERP) is 24,000 watts, making it a class C1 station.

== History ==
=== WDOL/WJSR ===
In January 1964, the station signed on as WDOL-FM. It was the FM counterpart of WDOL (1470 AM, now WXAG). Both stations were owned by James S. Rivers, who served as the president. Because WDOL was a daytimer, WDOL-FM simulcasted the AM station's country music format during the day and continued on its own after sunset when WDOL had to be off the air. WDOL-FM was powered at only 3,500 watts, limiting its signal to Athens and adjacent communities, not hitting the larger Atlanta radio market.

In the 1970s, the station got a boost to 50,000 watts. As more people acquired FM radios, WDOL-FM switched its call sign to WJSR in 1974 and aired a progressive rock format, while co-owned WDOL continued as a country outlet.

=== WAGQ ===
In 1976, WJSR was acquired by Broadcast Properties, Inc. The station flipped to Top 40/CHR, as WAGQ, and became an affiliate of the ABC Contemporary Network. Even though the station had a 50,000 watt signal on a 230 foot tower, it was still limited to serving Athens and its surrounding towns.

In the mid-1980s, WAGQ asked the Federal Communications Commission (FCC) for a construction permit to double its power to 100,000 watts and greatly increase its antenna height to over 1,000 feet (300 m), using a tower closer to Atlanta. This would make WAGQ a "move-in station", serving the more lucrative Atlanta market. The FCC granted the request, making WAGQ a Class C1 station.

=== WALR ===
In 1989, the station was sold to Ring Radio, Inc., which also owned WCNN. "Music Radio 104.7" debuted, with a hot adult contemporary format. The station switched its call sign to WALR in July 1990.

On October 8, 1990, WALR-FM was relaunched with an urban adult contemporary format as "Love 104.7", then later on as "Kiss 104.7". This was the second incarnation of the "Kiss" branding, after it was previously used in the mid-1980s on WEKS (the former call sign on 104.1). Under this format, it was the first permanent competitor to attempt to chip away at the African-American audience enjoyed by heritage urban station WVEE.

=== WFSH-FM ===
104.7 The Fish logo from 2000-2009

On August 30, 2000, WALR and its adult urban format moved to 104.1, now known as "Kiss 104.1", to make room for Christian contemporary "104.7 the Fish". The swap was part of an asset exchange between Cox Media Group and Salem Communications.

WFSH-FM hosted "Celebrate Freedom Atlanta" each year on Labor Day weekend. The free outdoor concert featured 15 to 20 artists and took place at Jim R. Miller Park in Marietta, Georgia. The concert had an attendance of 42,000 its first year in 2007.

=== WAIA ===
In December 2024, it was announced that WFSH-FM, along with all Salem Media-owned Christian Contemporary stations, was sold to Educational Media Foundation. A few weeks later, it was officially announced by EMF that the station would begin carrying the nationwide Air1 radio network, which would allow Atlanta to have access to Air1 as a full-powered station rather than a translator. Following the announcement, Salem made the relatively rare decision to allow the station and its personalties an entire month to say farewell to listeners. A final celebration for the 25-year-old station was held at Mount Paran Church in Atlanta and was attended by several hundred fans.

WFSH-FM signed off just before midnight on January 31, 2025, with "Goodbye" by Night Ranger being the final song played. "Air1" was then launched, with "Praise" by Elevation Worship being the first song played. In addition, the station's callsign changed to WAIA.
