= Phil Terrana =

Phil Terrana may refer to:

- Phil Terrana, legal name of Atlanta radio personality Steve McCoy on B98.5 FM
- Phil Terrana, on-air name of Mark Owens another Atlanta radio personality on WNNX
