= WHSG-TV =

Television station in Monroe, Georgia

- Monroe–Atlanta, Georgia; United States
- City: Monroe, Georgia
- Channels: Digital: 22 (UHF); Virtual: 63

Programming
- Affiliations: 63.1: TBN; for others, see § Subchannels

Ownership
- Owner: Trinity Broadcasting Network; (Trinity Broadcasting of Texas, Inc.)

History
- First air date: March 15, 1991
- Former channel numbers: Analog: 63 (UHF, 1991–2009); Digital: 44 (UHF, 2009–2019)
- Call sign meaning: "His Saving Grace" -or- Home Shopping Georgia (in reference to unrealized HSN affiliation)

Technical information
- Licensing authority: FCC
- Facility ID: 68058
- ERP: 1,000 kW
- HAAT: 310.3 m (1,018 ft)
- Transmitter coordinates: 33°44′40.9″N 84°21′35.7″W

Links
- Public license information: Public file; LMS
- Website: www.tbn.org

WHSG-TV (channel 63) is a religious television station licensed to Monroe, Georgia, United States, serving the Atlanta area. The station is owned by the Trinity Broadcasting Network (TBN). WHSG-TV's transmitter is located in Atlanta's Cabbagetown section.

Because it airs no local content (except for local insertion of the required station identification), it is not carried as a local channel on DirecTV; the network's national feed is already available, but TBN's subchannel sister networks are not available.

It had one broadcast translator, W55BM, licensed to Marietta with transmitter atop Sweat Mountain, northwest of Atlanta. That station was later W49DE and WXID-LP, an affiliate of JCTV.

== History ==
The construction permit for a new television station on channel 63 at Monroe was originally issued to a local permittee, Monroe Television, Inc., around 1987. In December 1989, TBN purchased the permit and completed the station's construction; WHSG commenced operations on March 15, 1991, as a TBN owned-and-operated outlet.

During the late 1990s through the early 2010s, WHSG played an important role within TBN, as it originated a weekly edition of the network's flagship program Praise the Lord and a portion of the ministry's semi-annual Praise-a-Thon fundraisers. This ended in 2017 when TBN revamped its local and network programming operations following Matt Crouch's ascension to leadership of the ministry, after the death of his mother and TBN co-founder Jan Crouch. The station's studio on Agape Way in Decatur was officially closed by TBN in 2019 following the Federal Communications Commission (FCC)'s repeal of the Main Studio Rule, and later sold.

== Technical information ==
=== Subchannels ===
The station's signal is multiplexed:

Subchannels of WHSG-TV
Subchannel	Res.	Short name	Programming
63.1	720p	TBN HD	TBN
63.2	720p	TVDEALS	Infomercials
63.3	480i	Inspire	TBN Inspire
63.4	480i	ONTV4U	OnTV4U (infomercials) (4:3)
63.5	480i	POSITIV	Positiv

TBN-owned full-power stations permanently ceased analog transmissions on April 16, 2009.

=== Analog-to-digital transition ===
WHSG-TV shut down its analog signal, over UHF channel 63, on April 16, 2009. The station's digital signal remained on its pre-transition UHF channel 44, using virtual channel 63, which was among the high band UHF channels (52-69) that were removed from broadcasting use as a result of the transition.

The station's analog transmitter was located in northern Rockdale County, halfway between Monroe and Atlanta. The station's digital facility is immediately south of Atlanta's Inman Park neighborhood, along the north side of Interstate 20. This is the same tower used by WUPA (channel 69), built by that station when its original location (atop the Westin Peachtree Plaza hotel) could not hold a second large TV antenna for digital, although WUPA has since moved to the North Druid Hills site, sharing an antenna through a diplexer. It also has WIRE-CD (channel 40), an expired construction permit for W06CM-D (channel 6), and a license for WYGA-CD on channel 16 (as well as a permit for 18 and a later app for 16 again). No serious damage occurred to the tower when the 2008 Atlanta tornado passed by the site, even though the then-analog WYGA-CA 45 (operating from the site under STA at very low power until WGCL-TV (channel 46) went digital) was knocked off-air. WHSG had an application to increase from 700 kW to its maximum 1,000 kW effective radiated power with the same antenna height, which is now licensed at the new site.
