= Stu Klitenic =

- Born: 1955 (age 70–71)
- Education: B.A., Masters in Journalism from the University of South Carolina
- Occupation: Sports broadcaster

Stu Klitenic (born 1955) is an American sports radio and television personality.

== Sports ==
Klitenic was a standout basketball player at Northwood High School in Silver Spring, Maryland. He was named "All-Met" in 1973 and in 2008 was named one of the top Montgomery County shooters of the 1970s. From 1973 through 1977, Klitenic played on the basketball team at the University of South Carolina under Hall of Fame coach Frank McGuire. In May 1977, he was selected as one of 12 Jewish basketball players from the United States to compete in the 1977 Maccabiah Games in Israel. That team went on to win the gold medal. In 1998, he was named to the Jewish Community Center of Greater Washington's Sports Hall of Fame.

== Broadcasting ==
He worked at WBNS-TV in Columbus, Ohio and WXYZ-TV in Detroit, during the mid-1980s. Until mid-1989, he was sports director at television station KTVI in St. Louis, Missouri. In the 1990s, he was the sports anchor at WSB-TV in Atlanta. In 2005, he was named co-host of the Atlanta Braves postgame show with former Brave Mark Lemke.
