= Zilla Mays =

American singer

Zilla Florine Mays (September 1, 1931 – September 19, 1995), later Zilla Mays Hinton, was an American R&B and gospel singer who became a popular radio DJ and community leader in Atlanta. She was the first African-American female radio announcer in Georgia, and only the third in the United States.

== Life ==
She was born in Atlanta, Georgia, and started singing in church. By her teens, she had started performing with her brother's band, the Roy Mays All Stars, which later became the Willie Mays Blues Caravan. ("Willie" was Roy Mays' nickname.) After graduating from Booker T. Washington High School in 1949, she studied at Reed Business College. In late 1950, she was signed as a blues singer by Savoy Records in Newark, New Jersey. She made her first recordings in early 1951, but none were issued until the Coral label released "I'll Keep Singing My Song" in late 1952. The following year, she signed for the Mercury label and recorded with the John Peek orchestra, releasing the singles "If You Were On The Other Side", "Seems Like You Just Don't Care", and "Don't Take My Good Love Away".

In 1954 she began broadcasting on radio station WAOK in Atlanta, where she was known as "The Mystery Lady" as her identity was not disclosed to listeners. After it was revealed in 1955, she was known as "The Dream Girl", and often performed on-air with Piano Red. She also continued to record in the mid-1950s, for labels including Groove, a subsidiary of RCA, and then Atco.

She continued as a popular radio personality and community leader in the Atlanta area and was instrumental in bringing live R&B and gospel music to the area. Her career increasingly turned to gospel music, broadcasting a regular "Cathedral of Friends" Sunday program as well as a regular gospel show. In 1961, Checker Records released an album, Prayers for Jackie, and the same year she recorded another album, for the NRC label, The Men I Love And The Songs They Sing. She also continued to work with Piano Red in shows and on radio. In about 1968, she recorded a version of Allen Toussaint's “All I Want Is You” for his Tou-Sea label. Her radio show on WAOK changed to a gospel format in the late 1970s.

She won numerous awards in the course of her career, including a Pioneer Award from the NAACP in 1986. After spending almost 40 years at WAOK, she died in Atlanta in 1995 at the age of 64. In 2019 she received the Posthumous Radio Pioneer Award from the Atlanta chapter of the National Black Radio Hall of Fame.
