= WSRV =

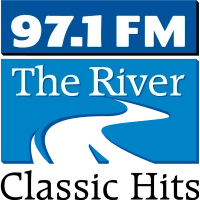
- Gainesville, Georgia; United States
- Broadcast area: Atlanta metropolitan area
- Frequency: 97.1 MHz (HD Radio)
- Branding: 97.1 The River

Programming
- Language: English
- Format: Classic rock
- Subchannels: HD2: Alternative rock; HD3: Talk radio (WSB); HD4: Latin pop (WCHK)
- Affiliations: Atlanta Gladiators

Ownership
- Owner: Cox Media Group; (Cox Radio, LLC)
- Sister stations: WALR-FM; WSB; WSB-FM; WSB-TV; WSBB-FM

History
- First air date: November 1, 1965; 60 years ago
- Former call signs: WWQT (1965–1972); WFOX (1972–2006)
- Call sign meaning: Chattahoochee River

Technical information
- Licensing authority: FCC
- Facility ID: 59970
- Class: C
- ERP: 100,000 watts
- HAAT: 483 meters (1,585 ft)
- Transmitter coordinates: 34.1257°N 83.8588°W
- Translators: HD2: 93.5 W228CA (Suwanee); HD2: 97.7 W249CK (Duluth); HD4: 96.5 W243CE (Winder)

Links
- Public license information: Public file; LMS
- Webcast: Listen live; Listen live (via Audacy); Listen live (via iHeartRadio)
- Website: 971theriver.com

WSRV (97.1 FM) – branded 97.1 The River – is a commercial radio station licensed to Gainesville, Georgia, and serving Metro Atlanta. It is owned by the Cox Media Group. WSRV broadcasts a classic rock radio format. The studios and offices are in the Cox Television and Radio Facility on West Peachtree Street near the Brookwood neighborhood of Atlanta.

WSRV has an effective radiated power (ERP) of 100,000 watts. The transmitter tower is off Eagle Ranch Road in Braselton, at the northeastern edge of Metro Atlanta. WSRV uses the HD Radio technology. Its HD2 digital subchannel carries an alternative rock format known as "The Other Side of The River." The HD3 subchannel simulcasts the talk format on WSB. The HD4 subchannel simulcasts the Latin Pop format on WCHK.

== History ==
=== Early years ===
On November 1, 1965, the station signed on as WWQT. It was the FM counterpart to AM 1580 WLBA Gainesville (now WPGY Ellijay), and were owned by the Hall County Broadcasting Company. WWQT was powered at 100,000 watts but only using a 440-foot tower, so it wasn't heard over much of Metro Atlanta.

In 1972, it was bought by Radio Athens, Inc., and would adopt the WFOX call sign. WFOX initially aired a Top 40 format, still targeting the Gainesville area of Northeastern Georgia. In 1983, the station was acquired by Shamrock Broadcasting, which had plans to make it a large market station.

=== Move to metro Atlanta ===
In 1985, Shamrock moved WFOX's tower closer to the more lucrative Atlanta media market, flipped to adult contemporary, and increased their new tower height to 1,550 feet. In 1989, Shamrock was acquired by Chancellor Media. From January 1989 to January 2003, the station aired an oldies format as "Fox 97."

In 2000, AMFM (the former Chancellor Media) was bought by Clear Channel Communications, which already owned several Atlanta stations. To meet federally mandated ownership limits, Cox Radio acquired the station.

=== Cox Radio ownership ===
On January 31, 2003, WFOX began stunting by simulcasting several of its sister stations from across the country, including WPYM in Miami, WAPE in Jacksonville, KCCN in Honolulu, KKBQ in Houston, KHPT in Houston, WBLI on Long Island, WHZT in Upstate South Carolina, KINE in Honolulu and WDYL in Richmond.

On February 3, 2003, WFOX switched to an uptempo Urban AC format as "97.1 Jamz." At first, the station ran with no DJs. Because co-owned WALR-FM ("Kiss 104.1") was so popular in the Atlanta market playing a more traditional Urban AC format, "Jamz" primarily aired '80s/'90s R&B, hip-hop and current songs, targeting primarily 25- to 39-year-olds. The station's main competitors were WVEE and WHTA, with whom it competed for the coveted 18 to 34 demographic, the same demo that rhythmic contemporary-formatted sister station WBTS targeted.

=== Classic hits ===
On January 1, 2006, the station flipped to "97.1 The River," with a mix of classic hits and classic rock, targeting people ages 25–54. The playlist was familiar and hit-oriented, like most classic hits stations, but leaned towards primarily rock songs from the late 1960s, 70s and 80s, with no pop or dance music.

On April 17, 2006, WFOX changed its own call sign to WSRV, to match the "River" moniker, which is a nod to the Chattahoochee River. The WFOX call letters would move to another Cox Radio station, the former WEFX, in Norwalk, Connecticut.

=== Classic rock ===
WSRV would later move to a more standard classic rock playlist, even though it still identifies itself on the air as "Classic Hits." In addition, WSRV plays a few 1990s titles but no 2000s music. "Rock Blocks," which feature three songs in a row from the same artist/group, sometimes including deep cuts and live material, are featured during the day and on weekends.

On June 19, 2006, Lexie Kaye became the River's first female, on-air personality doing mornings solo every weekday from 5:30 am–8:30 am. Lexie was the only live on-air personality for the River, doing all remote broadcasts and concert promotions. Chris Miller was the program director for WSRV - FM.

In October 2011, rock singer Eddie Money became the host of “Money in the Morning,” an experiment that lasted about three months.

In September 2013, WSRV upgraded to an interactive radio station. Listeners can control the music by like/dislike the songs, and record themselves then send it to be played on the air. Whatever song has the most likes when the previous one finishes is next to play.

WSRV is currently broadcasting digital radio using the HD Radio system, and features adult alternative rock on its HD-2 channel branded as "The Other Side of The River". Both stations stream live via WSRV's website.

== Signal ==
WSRV's city of license is Gainesville, Georgia, in Hall County. Its transmitter is in the southern tip of Hall County, just across the line from Braselton. WSRV can be considered a "move-in" station, since it originally concentrated on the Gainesville area. While still licensed to that city, its transmitter moved closer to Atlanta to target the larger Atlanta market.

WSRV's broadcast range covers almost all of Northeast Georgia, even heard in a tiny portion of Upstate South Carolina. Other cities covered include Athens, Cartersville, Roswell and Toccoa. Depending on radio propagation conditions, with a good radio and antenna, the station can be picked up as far away as Knoxville, Tennessee, and at times, Greenville, South Carolina. Due to WSRV's transmitter location, listeners may have some trouble picking up the signal in Atlanta suburbs south and west of the city. The station has asked the FCC to downgrade to Class C0 while moving its transmitter even closer to Atlanta.

== Broadcast translators ==
WSRV's HD2 digital subchannel carries "The Other Side of the River," an alternative rock format. It feeds two FM translators: W249CK FM 97.7 in Duluth (transmitting with 75 watts), and W228CA FM 93.5 Suwanee, transmitting with 230 watts. The translators are heard mainly in Gwinnett and adjacent northeast metro counties.

WSRV was previously the primary station for W243CE 96.5 FM, a translator in Winder, Georgia. Licensed for just five watts of effective radiated power, it is owned by Davis Broadcasting of Atlanta. It was originally permitted in 2004 and started in 2007 by Radio Assist Ministry, a company that speculatively filed for thousands of translator stations and then rented or resold them for profit.

The station had a construction permit to move to the WSRV/WSBB radio tower, increase to the maximum translator power of 250 watts, and exponentially increase its height from 4 to 392 meters (1,286 ft). This would give it the broadcast range of a Class A station. Following a change in rules by the FCC, W243CE was instead moved all the way to Columbus, Georgia, in the west central part of the state, to give an FM signal to WOKS (AM 1340).

On April 16, 2018, WSRV-HD3 began simulcasting on translator W222AF 92.3 FM Marietta with an urban contemporary format, branded as "Power 92.3 Jamz." Cox removed the W222AF programming in December 2018, due to a dispute with the programmer who was leasing the translator from its owner.
