= Frank Ski =

American DJ, journalist (born 1964)

- Born: Frank Rodriguez; May 9, 1964 (age 62); Harlem, New York
- Occupations: DJ, journalist, philanthropist, public forums host
- Spouses: Tanya Rodriguez (1995–2015); Patrice Basanta-Henry, MD (2017)
- Children: 5
- Presenting career
- Show: "Frank and Wanda in the Morning"
- Stations: WVEE (V-103), WHUR (Washington, DC) WALR KISS 104.1 Atlanta
- Country: United States
- Website: www.frankski.com

Frank Rodriguez, professionally known as Frank Ski (born May 9, 1964), is an American DJ, journalist, philanthropist, radio personality, and public forums host.

He is also recognized as a Baltimore club and house music artist through his solo and group work with 2 Hyped Brothers & a Dog. From 1998 to 2012, and again from 2017 to January 2019, he hosted the Frank and Wanda in the Morning Show alongside co-host Wanda Smith on the Atlanta urban contemporary radio station WVEE. He currently hosts The Morning Culture show, alongside Jade Novah and J.R. Jackson.

== Biography ==
=== Career highlights ===
Frank Ski was recognized by Reverend Jesse Jackson's Rainbow Push Coalition in 2002 for his contributions to journalism. He has also hosted significant events such as the International Civil Rights Walk of Fame, promoting awareness of historical civil rights achievements.

=== Awards and recognition ===
- Rainbow Push Coalition, Reverend Jesse Jackson (2002)
- Georgia March of Dimes, Achievement in Radio Award (A.I.R.)
- National Urban League, Atlanta Chapter; Distinguished Community Service Award (2007)
- Ludacris Foundation, Community Service Award, 2008
- 11 Alive Community Service Award (2009)
- Mentioned by Uganda Musician Ritah Kigozi in her song "Twandibadewo" (3:23-3:25)

== Frank Ski Kids Foundation ==
The Frank Ski Kids Foundation is an organization created by Ski in 2005, acting in the Atlanta area. It aims to help children explore their ambitions by engaging them in science, technology, athletics, and the arts. The foundation also hosts a yearly Youth Bowl football competition, and it gives young people the opportunity to travel abroad on excursions.

== Studio albums ==
- Ya Rollin' Doo Doo (with 2 Hyped Brothers & a Dog) (1991)
- Frank Ski Club Trax (1992)

== Singles ==
- "Doo Doo Brown" (with 2 Hyped Brothers & a Dog) (1991)
- "Tony's Bitch Track" (1992)
- "Whores In This House" (1992)
