= Steve McCoy =

American radio personality

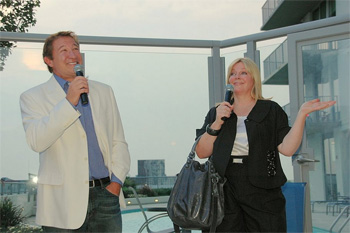
- McCoy and Vikki Locke at their Welcome Back Party for B98.5 in Atlanta, Georgia
- Presenting career
- Time slot: Morning Drive
- Style: Top 40 hits, adult contemporary
- Country: United States
- Previous shows: Steve and Vikki Morning Show (WSTR 1990–2007, WSB-FM 2008–2010), Morning Show KXKL-FM.

Steve McCoy is an American radio personality best known for his morning show with Vikki Locke in Atlanta, Georgia for over 18 years on WSTR. The duo was twice nominated for the Marconi Award. McCoy came to Atlanta in 1981 to work at WZGC FM (Z-93, now 92.9 The Game).

== Background ==
=== Radio ===
McCoy came to Atlanta in 1981 to work at legendary top 40 WZGC FM (Z-93,now 92.9 The Game). He remained there until 1987, when he jumped to new top 40 station Power 99. This is where he began working with Locke, who was doing the news at the time. In 1989, Steve left Atlanta, after a nationwide search by Ron Chapman found Steve to be his one and only replacement for his long-time morning show at KVIL FM in Dallas, Texas. One year into the plan, however, Clarke Brown, the man who launched Star 94 (Atlanta) talked Steve into coming back to the town he loved to take over the morning show. He said he'd only come back if they'd get Vikki to come on board. Steve returned, and he and Vikki helped the struggling WSTR FM (Star 94) morning show (and eventually the whole station) receive higher Arbitron ratings. Steve and Vikki's 18-year run on Star 94 was only bested by Rhubarb Jones' 23-year run on country station WYAY Y106.7/Eagle 106.7 both WYAY, now K-Love.

In the fall of 2006, Vikki was diagnosed with a blood clot in her arm and began a year and a half long process of treatment. Just before Christmas 2007 she had her final MRI on her arm, and the treatment had worked. The blood clot had broken apart, and she was clear of danger. Steve and Vikki once again teamed up together for the morning show on B98.5 FM from July 1, 2008 to March 5, 2010.

In May 2008, the owners of WSTR sued WSB-FM for airing TV commercials featuring McCoy and Locke prior to their show's debut on the station, claiming that the timing violated a non-compete agreement. A judge disagreed and the ads continued. Since joining B98.5, the Steve and Vikki morning show was ranked 4th in the 25- to 54-year-olds market in their first few months on air.

In February 2010, WSB-FM decided not to renew Steve's contract for the next year. Steve's co-host of more than 18 years Vikki was offered a renewal contract to continue the morning show. Although his original contract was through June, McCoy's last day on air was March 5, 2010.

On May 17, 2010 he started as morning host on KXKL-FM 105.1 in Denver, Colorado. Steve's longtime radio co-host Vikki stayed with B98.5 at a lower pay rate. After nearly 18 months, Steve left Denver to move back to Atlanta to be with his family.

Steve McCoy was fired by News Radio 106.7 in October 2015 after he admitted to recycling an old interview with Donald Trump and intimating it was current.

=== Personal ===
While working at STAR 94—in 2007, Steve noticed his right hand was trembling a bit. After visiting a few doctors, he was told that he had Parkinson's disease. He managed to keep it quiet from his co-workers, and was able to hold off telling anyone until 2015 when he finally had to tell his children and friends. Due to his continual spiral downward with the symptoms getting worse, he finally felt like had to tell everyone. In 2014, he was invited by Michael J. Fox to become one of the two ambassadors for the State of Georgia for Parkinson's and work for The Michael J. Fox Foundation. He has joined Michael J. Fox in Washington DC twice to speak to Congress about having Parkinson's, and is fighting for more research money to be given for Parkinson's research.
