= WSBB-FM =

News/talk radio station in Doraville–Atlanta, Georgia

Simulcast of WSB, Atlanta
- Doraville, Georgia; United States
- Broadcast area: Metro Atlanta
- Frequency: 95.5 MHz (HD Radio)
- Branding: 95.5 WSB

Programming
- Format: Talk radio
- Network: ABC News Radio
- Affiliations: Compass Media Networks; CBS News Radio; Premiere Networks; Georgia Bulldogs; WSB-TV

Ownership
- Owner: Cox Media Group; (Cox Radio, LLC)
- Sister stations: WALR-FM; WSB; WSB-FM; WSB-TV; WSRV

History
- First air date: May 1, 1948
- Former call signs: WGAU-FM (1948–1968); WNGC (1968–1999); WYAP (1999); WBTS (1999–2010)
- Call sign meaning: taken from the station's simulcast of WSB (750 AM)

Technical information
- Licensing authority: FCC
- Facility ID: 11710
- Class: C1
- ERP: 100,000 watts
- HAAT: 279 meters (915 ft)
- Transmitter coordinates: 33.759278°N 84.334639°W

Links
- Public license information: Public file; LMS
- Webcast: Listen live; Listen live (via Audacy); Listen live (via iHeartRadio)
- Website: www.wsbradio.com

WSBB-FM (95.5 MHz) is a commercial radio station licensed to Doraville, Georgia, United States, and serving Metro Atlanta. WSBB-FM and co-owned WSB (750 AM) jointly simulcast a talk radio format. The stations are owned by the Cox Media Group and are among the highest-billing stations in the U.S. On the air, the two stations are referred to as "95.5 WSB", only occasionally mentioning the FM station's call sign or the AM station's frequency.

WSB/WSBB's studios are located on West Peachtree Street NE in Atlanta, in the WSB-TV and Radio Group Building; WSBB-FM's transmitter is sited in Edgewood, just east of Downtown Atlanta. WSBB-FM also broadcasts in HD Radio.

== History ==
=== Early years ===
The station first signed on the air on May 1, 1948, as WGAU-FM on 99.5 MHz in Athens, Georgia. It broadcast at 3,600 watts, simulcasting sister station WGAU, still owned by Cox. In 1956, when Channel 11 (now WXIA-TV) came on the air in Atlanta, WGAU-FM created a second harmonic at 199.0, on top of the video carrier of WXIA-TV at 199.25. That caused interference for WXIA-TV, so WGAU-FM got permission from the Federal Communications Commission to move to 102.5 MHz. In 1962, WGAU-FM began broadcasting each day in stereo for six hours, the second station in Georgia to devote a significant part of its day to playing music in stereo. In 1962, WGAU-FM moved to 95.5 FM.

=== Country (1968–1999) ===
In 1968, the station became WNGC, standing for "North Georgia Country". It was North Georgia's first full-time FM country music station and one of the first stand-alone FM country stations in the nation, not simply rebroadcasting a country AM station. WNGC went to a 24 hours a day schedule in 1976 and began broadcasting with an effective radiated power of 100,000 watts from the Neese Tower in Madison County.

=== Rhythmic (1999–2010) ===
In 1999, Clarke Broadcasting, long-time owner of WNGC and WGAU, wanted to sell its Athens properties. Cox Radio acquired the stations for $78 million. Cox decided to flip WNGC to Top 40, briefly using the WYAP call letters before settling on WBTS, using the moniker "The Beat".

On September 25, 1999, the country format was dropped and the station began stunting with a loop of "Wild Thing" by Tone-Loc. When "The Beat" officially signed on September 27, its direction focused on mainstream pop, dance, and rock, even though it had a rhythmic lean. Under the direction of Program Director Dale O'Brian, it would drop all mainstream pop/rock and go rhythmic full-time. The rhythmic direction paid off in the Arbitron ratings, putting them among the top 10 stations in Atlanta. With this hip-hop bent, WBTS competed with WVEE and WHTA, while on the top-40 side it competed with WWWQ and WSTR. With the implementation of Portable People Meters in the Atlanta Arbitrons, WBTS had the second-most listened-to cume in the market behind WVEE."WBTS 95.5 Athens Atlanta 18 January 2000".

In October 2005, the station switched its slogan from "Atlanta's New #1 Hit Music Station" to "Atlanta's New #1 for Hip Hop". Despite the shift, Cox was still billing the station as rhythmic top 40 (as the station still added rhythmic-friendly pop artists like Pink to its playlist) and continued to report to R&R's rhythmic reporting panel. Also in 2005, Cox received FCC approval to change WBTS's city of license from Athens, a city 40 miles from Atlanta, to Doraville, a suburb of Atlanta; the station's studios and transmitter did not move with that change. In August 2006, the station tapped on-air personality Murph Dawg from WHZT, a Cox station in Greenville to host a new morning show with 6-year Atlanta veteran Stacy C, billing it as "Murph Dawg in the Morning with Stacy C". The alliance was short-lived, and after only a few months, Murph Dawg found himself solo. In May 2007, WBTS hired a member of WHTA's "The A-Team" morning show, CJ. The newly created morning show "Murph Dawg & CJ in the Morning" rose in the 18–34 demographics. In Spring 2008, WBTS hit its highest numbers in station history, with a 6.5 share in 18–34. "Murph Dawg & CJ in the Morning" hit 5th place, with later dayparts reaching the Top 2 and Top 3 ranks. In August 2008, WBTS again pulled a personality from across the street at WHTA, tapping overnight jock and mixer Mami Chula to fill the Night Show position that had been vacant since former night host Austin left in November 2007 for a gig in Indianapolis.

Other personalities that made up the WBTS weekday lineup included K-Dubb in middays, and Maverick in afternoons. Kenny Hamilton, Traci Steele, Johnny D, and Mo Reilley rounded-out the weekend lineup with DJ Kidd handling the primary mix show duties. The station program director was Cagle with Maverick as the assistant program director/music director.

In 2009, WBTS gained another competitor, as Clear Channel's WWVA-FM flipped from Spanish contemporary to rhythmic contemporary, becoming "105-7 the Groove". (WWVA-FM later hired Mami Chula for nights and Maverick for middays and programming duties after WBTS left the rhythmic format.)

=== News-talk (2010–present) ===
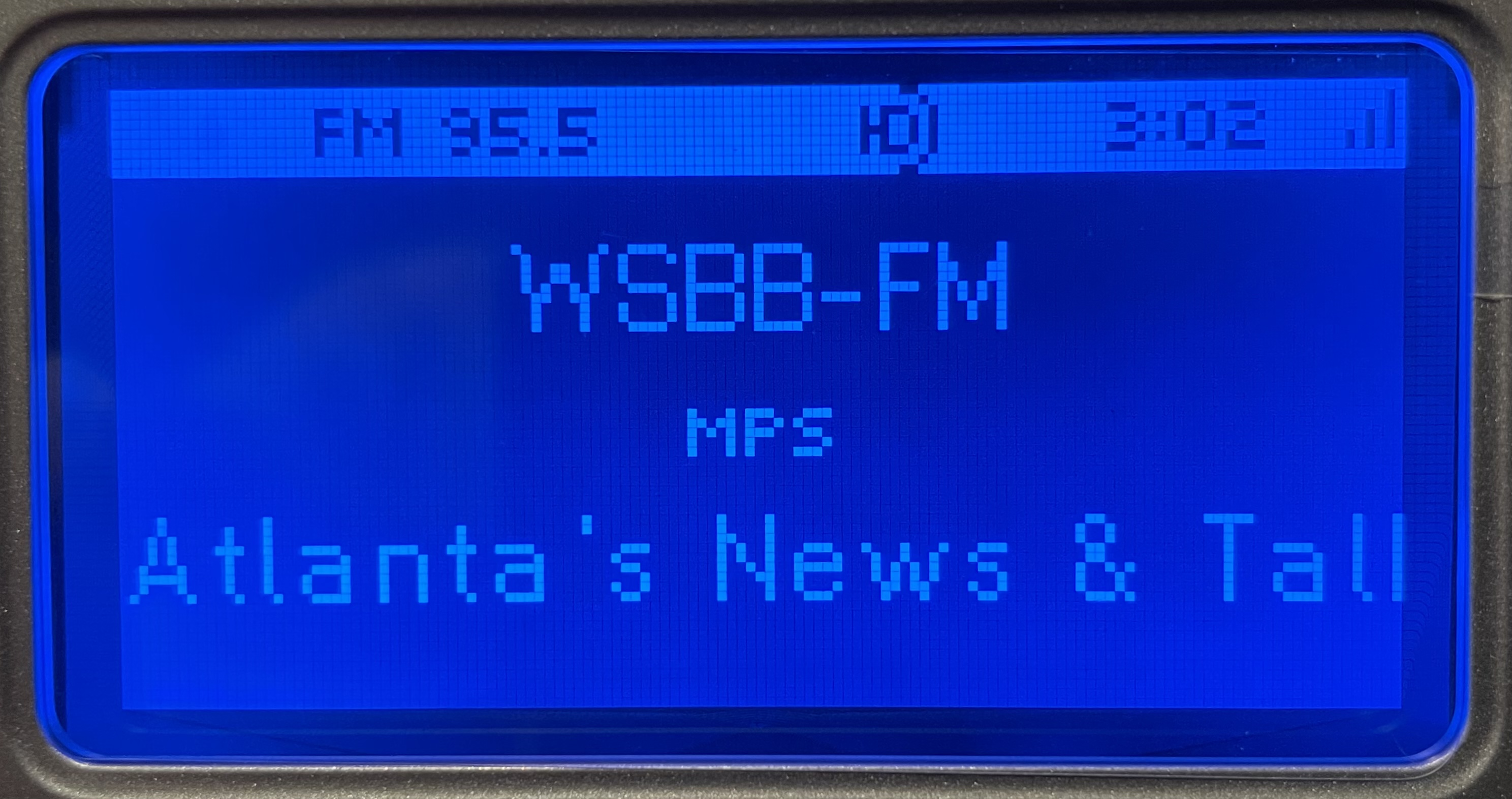
WSBB-HD signal

On August 16, 2010, Cox abruptly flipped WBTS to a simulcast of WSB. Cox Radio officials said that the move was necessary to keep WSB, long the dominant radio station in Atlanta, relevant to younger listeners who did not usually listen to AM radio. WBTS's DJs and sales staff were offered jobs at other stations in the Cox Atlanta cluster. The callsign was changed to WSBB-FM that October 1, a move made to adjust the callsign to parallel its AM parent (the heritage WSB-FM callsign remains at 98.5 FM).

On July 31, 2019, WSB and WSBB rebranded as "95.5 WSB". While AM 750 remains the primary signal, all references to it were dropped aside from hourly legal station identification. WSBB-FM began broadcasting from its new transmitter location east of Atlanta on August 20, 2019. Besides a desire to reach younger listeners, WSBB-FM also serves to improve WSB's coverage in areas where the AM side's daytime signal has usually been weak. WSB's daytime coverage area is not nearly as large as that of other 50,000-watt AM stations due to Georgia's poor ground conductivity.

WSB's Scott Slade hosted Atlanta's Morning News until February 2023, when he stepped back from full-time hosting. He was succeeded by evening news anchor Chris Chandler, and remains semi-retired as a fill-in host. In April 2023, 31-year morning news host Marcy Williams retired from WSB. She calculated she wrote more than 300,000 radio news stories.

== Programming ==
WSB and WSBB-FM mostly air local news and talk shows. Weekdays begin with Atlanta's Morning News, anchored by Chris Chandler, Judd Hickenbachem and Cheryl Castro. Airborne traffic reports and weather forecasts are featured every six minutes. Clark Howard provides consumer reports. Middays, afternoons and early evenings feature local talk programs. They include The Mark Arum Show, The Erick Erickson Show. The Von Haessler Doctrine hosted by Eric Von Haessler and The Shelley Wynter Show. A delayed broadcast of The Sean Hannity Show airs at 9 p.m., syndicated via Premiere Networks, with repeats of daytime shows heard overnight.

Weekends feature shows on gardening, home repair, cars, real estate, health and money, some of which are paid brokered programming. Syndicated weekend shows include Bill Handel on the Law, The Kim Komando Show, Eye on Travel with Peter Greenberg and Face The Nation. WSB and WSBB-FM are affiliates of CBS News Radio. The stations have a news sharing agreement with WSB-TV.

WSB and WSBB-FM serve as the flagship radio stations for the University of Georgia Bulldogs Radio Network, carrying all Bulldogs football and basketball games.
