= WALR-FM =

Radio station in Palmetto–Atlanta, Georgia, United States

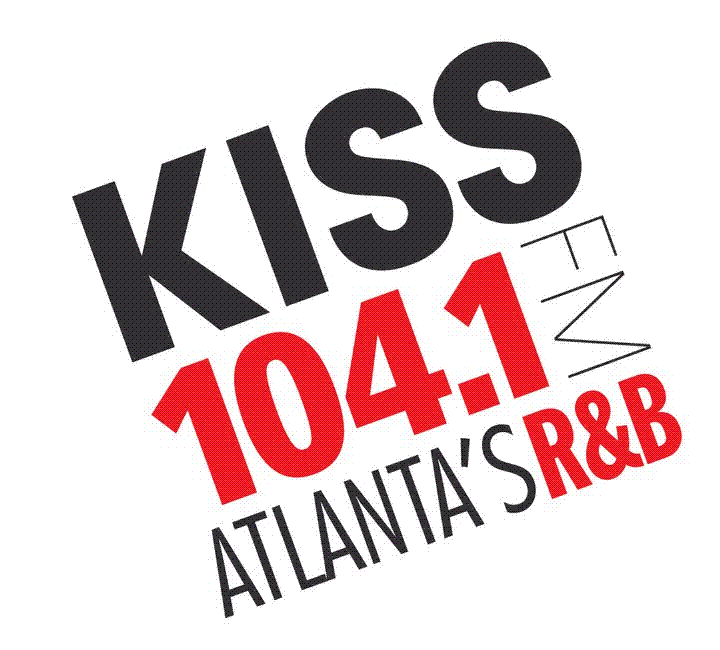
- Palmetto, Georgia; United States
- Broadcast area: Atlanta metropolitan area
- Frequency: 104.1 MHz (HD Radio)
- Branding: Kiss 104.1

Programming
- Language: English
- Format: Urban adult contemporary
- Affiliations: Compass Media Networks; Premiere Networks; Westwood One

Ownership
- Owner: Cox Media Group; (Cox Radio, LLC)
- Sister stations: WSB; WSB-FM; WSB-TV; WSBB-FM; WSRV

History
- First air date: September 1, 1947; 79 years ago
- Former call signs: WLAG-FM (1947–1977); WWCG (1977–1984); WJYF (1985–1987); WEKS (1987–1989); WYAI (1989–1994); WHTK-FM (1994); WJZF-FM (1994–2000)
- Call sign meaning: Previously used on WALR (104.7 FM), now WAIA (FM), standing for that station's previous run as "Atlanta's light rock"

Technical information
- Licensing authority: FCC
- Facility ID: 48728
- Class: C1
- ERP: 100,000 watts
- HAAT: 283 meters (928 ft)
- Transmitter coordinates: 33.4121°N 84.8341°W
- Repeater: 98.5 WSB-HD2 (Atlanta)

Links
- Public license information: Public file; LMS
- Webcast: Listen live; Listen live (via Audacy); Listen live (via iHeartRadio)
- Website: www.kiss104fm.com

WALR-FM (104.1 MHz Kiss 104.1) is a commercial radio station licensed to Palmetto, Georgia and serving Metro Atlanta. It is owned by the Cox Media Group and airs an urban adult contemporary radio format. The station's studios are co-located with other Cox-owned radio stations and WSB-TV in Midtown Atlanta on West Peachtree Street.

WALR-FM is a Class C1 station with an effective radiated power (ERP) of 100,000 watts. Its transmitter is on Duncan Memorial Highway (Route 166) in Winston, Georgia. WALR-FM broadcasts in the HD Radio hybrid format.

== Programming ==
Mornings begin with Atlanta radio legend Frank Rodriguez, known professionally as Frank Ski. Middays are hosted by Dyron Ducati, followed by British rapper Monie Love in afternoons. In the evening, a "Slow Jamz" show is heard until midnight. On Sunday mornings, ordained minister Twanda Black hosts an urban gospel program. In 2018, Terri Avery became the Program Director.

== History ==
Former Kiss 104 logo.

=== Early years ===
On September 1, 1947, the station first signed on as WLAG-FM. Its city of license was LaGrange, Georgia, about 40 miles (64 km) southwest of Atlanta and near the Alabama border. It was the FM counterpart to WLAG 1240 AM, owned by the LaGrange Broadcasting Company. Both stations simulcast a country music format. WLAG-FM's power was 29,500 watts and the antenna height was 220 feet (67 m), so it was not heard in the Atlanta area. The station changed its call sign to WWCG in 1977 and continued with a country format.

In the early 1980s, the station got a big boost in power. It increased to 100,000 watts, using a tower taller than the Empire State Building, giving it coverage of much of the Atlanta radio market. It began broadcasting Al Ham's syndicated "Music Of Your Life" adult standards format with call signs WJYF and WJYA-FM, a simulcast partner with WJYA (1080 AM).

In 1985, it was acquired by Zapis Communications, headed by Lee Zapis. In 1987, he switched the format to urban contemporary as WEKS, "Urban Kiss 104."

Zapis then sold the station to NewCity Communications in 1989. NewCity had a plan to pair two different FM stations surrounding Atlanta to create one facility covering the market. To bring attention to the change, on June 21, WEKS went silent. The station signed back on the air on June 28, and began stunting with music played by local celebrities, including then-Atlanta mayor Andrew Young. Finally, at 3 p.m. on June 30, WEKS switched back to country music as WYAI ("Y104"), simulcasting with WYAY FM (Y106.7) on the other side of Atlanta. The two stations began competing with long-time Atlanta country leader WKHX.

On January 1, 1994, the simulcast ended, with 104.1 flipping to a smooth jazz format as "Jazz Flavors 104.1". In addition, the station changed calls to WJZF to match the new branding.

Cox Enterprises, owner of WSB, WSB-FM, WSB-TV and two newspapers, entered into a local marketing agreement (LMA) with WJZF. Cox tried to buy the station in 1995. However, the Federal Communications Commission (FCC) denied the request when challenged by Jacor Broadcasting, even though Cox intended to make changes to the WJZF signal "to avoid cross-ownership conflicts."

=== WALR "Kiss 104" ===
The station that would later migrate to this frequency began in 1964 in Athens, Georgia as WDOL-FM at 104.7 MHz. At first it simulcast its AM sister station, 1370 WDOL. It later began airing separate programming, first as "Love 104," then as "Kiss 104.7", an urban contemporary station. (This new "Kiss" on 104.7 was a resurrection of the previous incarnation from WEKS mentioned above, although it only covered the eastern suburbs of the Atlanta market, from its Athens tower.)

On August 30, 2000, Cox and Salem Communications swapped frequencies. "Kiss 104.7" migrated to the 104.1 frequency, previously a Christian Contemporary music station known as "The Fish." The former WALR-FM at 104.7 became "104.7 the Fish" WFSH-FM and the 104.1 frequency became Hot Urban AC, "Kiss 104.1," taking the WALR-FM call sign. The smooth jazz format was picked up the following year by WJZZ (now WAMJ). Also, the AM simulcast on what is now WIFN ceased shortly after the switch although it continued to carry the WALR call sign under a changed format for some time. In Atlanta, the rights to the "Kiss FM" brand had been grandfathered; thus Clear Channel Communications (later iHeart), which trademarked the brand for its Top 40 stations, heard in many U.S. cities such as Los Angeles and Boston, did not attempt to take legal action against Cox.

=== Switch to urban oldies ===
On February 21, 2003, WALR-FM switched to Urban Oldies, while retaining the "Kiss" branding. Cox wanted to draw a distinction between "Kiss" and co-owned WFOX (97.1 FM). At the time, WFOX experimented with a format consisting of R&B, hip hop and rap music from the 1980s to present. With the format shift, WALR-FM's longtime slogan changed from Atlanta's R&B Station to Atlanta's Old School R&B Station.

In late 2004, WALR switched to a new tower, closer to Atlanta. It also began broadcasting in IBOC digital radio, using the HD Radio system from iBiquity.

WALR-FM became the last Atlanta station owned by Cox Radio targeting the African-American audience. On August 16, 2010, co-owned WBTS flipped from rhythmic contemporary to WSBB-FM, a news-talk simulcast of WSB. Previously, co-owned WFOX had played urban contemporary music as "97.1 Jamz" until 2006, when it flipped to classic hits and classic rock as WSRV "The River."

=== Return to urban AC ===
In June 2011, WALR-FM shifted back to urban AC; the station added more contemporary R&B music and dropped some of the older titles, after spending eight years as a classic and gold-based R&B and soul music format. This helped WALR-FM increase its listeners, especially against longtime CBS-owned WVEE and direct format rival WAMJ/WUMJ. WALR-FM's logo and slogan were modified as well from Atlanta's Old School R&B Station to Atlanta's R&B; in addition, the station's branding was shortened to simply Kiss 104, omitting the ".1". At the same time, WALR-FM dropped all weekend mix shows, and expanded its nighttime slow jams show. As of February 2012, the station has not been listed on the Mediabase urban AC add board.

In 2017, WALR-FM changed its city of license from LaGrange to Palmetto, Georgia, a suburban community about 15 miles southwest of downtown Atlanta. WALR-FM had been the longtime Atlanta affiliate for "The Tom Joyner Morning Show" and also carried the syndicated "Michael Baisden Show" in afternoons. The morning drive time show was replaced with Art Terrell and comedian Roy Wood Jr. on November 27, 2017. Wood decided to concentrate on his TV appearances and was replaced by Cory "Zooman" Miller. Baisden's show was replaced by Sasha the Diva, who in turn was replaced by British rapper Monie Love in afternoons.
