= WSRM (FM) =

- Coosa, Georgia; United States
- Broadcast area: Rome, Georgia
- Frequency: 93.5 MHz
- Branding: South 93.5-Hank FM

Programming
- Format: Country

Ownership
- Owner: Howard Toole; (Rome Radio Partners, LLC)

History
- First air date: 2005 (at 95.3)
- Former frequencies: 95.3 MHz (2005–2009)

Technical information
- Licensing authority: FCC
- Facility ID: 30623
- Class: A
- ERP: 1,200 watts
- HAAT: 226 meters
- Transmitter coordinates: 34°14′03″N 85°13′51″W

Links
- Public license information: Public file; LMS
- Webcast: Listen Live
- Website: WSRM Online

WSRM (93.5 FM) is a radio station in Coosa, Georgia, serving the Rome, Georgia area. It is owned by Rome Radio Partners, LLC, and airs a country music format.
