= WSB-TV =

Television station in Atlanta

- Atlanta, Georgia; United States
- Channels: Digital: 32 (UHF); Virtual: 2
- Branding: Channel 2; Channel 2 Action News

Programming
- Affiliations: 2.1: ABC; for others, see § Subchannels

Ownership
- Owner: Cox Media Group; (Georgia Television, LLC)
- Sister stations: WALR-FM, WSB, WSB-FM, WSBB-FM, WSRV

History
- First air date: September 29, 1948
- Former call signs: WCON-TV (CP for channel 2, 1950–1951)
- Former channel numbers: Analog: 8 (VHF, 1948–1951), 2 (VHF, 1951–2009); Digital: 39 (UHF, 1998–2019)
- Former affiliations: NBC (1948–1980); ABC (secondary, 1948–1951)
- Call sign meaning: "Welcome South, Brother" (derived from sister station WSB radio)

Technical information
- Licensing authority: FCC
- Facility ID: 23960
- ERP: 869 kW
- HAAT: 326 m (1,070 ft)
- Transmitter coordinates: 33°45′51.7″N 84°21′41.7″W
- Translator(s): see § Translators

Links
- Public license information: Public file; LMS
- Website: www.wsbtv.com

WSB-TV (channel 2) is a television station in Atlanta, Georgia, United States, affiliated with ABC. It is the flagship television property of locally based Cox Media Group, which has owned the station since its inception, and is sister to radio stations WSB (750 AM), WSBB-FM (95.5), WSRV (97.1 FM), WSB-FM (98.5) and WALR-FM (104.1). The stations share studios at the WSB Television and Radio Group building on West Peachtree Street in Midtown Atlanta; WSB-TV's transmitter is located on the border of the city's Poncey-Highland and Old Fourth Ward neighborhoods.

WSB-TV is the second largest ABC-affiliated station by market size that is not owned and operated by the network (the largest being WFAA in Dallas, owned by the Tegna subsidiary of Nexstar Media Group).

== History ==
WSB-TV first began broadcasting on September 29, 1948, originally broadcasting on channel 8. It is the first television station in Georgia, and only the second station south of Washington, D.C., five months behind Richmond, Virginia's WTVR-TV (channel 6). The station was founded by James M. Cox, publisher of The Atlanta Journal, and who also owned WSB radio (AM 750 and 104.5 FM, now on 98.5 FM). Cox Enterprises owned WSB AM-FM-TV through its Dayton, Ohio-based subsidiary Miami Valley Broadcasting Inc., now known as Cox Media Group. The station was originally a primary NBC affiliate, owing to its radio sister's longtime affiliation with NBC Radio. It also carried some ABC programming from 1948 until 1951.

In 1950, Cox bought Atlanta's other major newspaper, The Atlanta Constitution, from its longtime owners, the Howell family. Both newspapers owned broadcast properties. Included in the latter were AM station WCON (550 kHz), which ceased operations May 31, 1950, in favor of the clear channel WSB; WCON-FM, which was merged with WSB-FM on the former's 98.5 MHz frequency; and the construction permit for WCON-TV (channel 2), which before the merger had begun construction on its tower at 780 Willoughby Way that it billed as the world's tallest. However, Cox now had a problem. At the time, the Federal Communications Commission (FCC) did not permit the sale of television station construction permits, considering it "trafficking". Cox thus had no choice but to keep the construction permit for WCON-TV rather than the already-operating WSB-TV. To solve the problem, Cox sold the channel 8 license for $525,000 to Broadcasting, Inc., a group of local businessmen, in 1951, with plans to move the WSB-TV call letters and intellectual unit to channel 2. The sale was challenged by applicants for additional stations that were affected by the then-ongoing freeze on new construction permits, including Georgia Tech (owners of WGST radio) and Decatur radio station owner, E. D. Rivers, in part because planned allocation changes meant that there would be no further commercial VHF stations for Atlanta and they sought to operate the channel as well.

The FCC dismissed the complaints and approved the sale of the channel 8 license to Broadcasting, Inc., in August 1951. In September 1951, channel 2 began broadcasting test patterns as WCON-TV—the only time the call letters were used on air—receiving reception reports from as far as 230 miles (370 km) away. On September 30, WSB-TV officially moved to channel 2; channel 8 returned at 5 p.m. that day as ABC affiliate WLTV. In 1953, WLTV became WLWA-TV (now WXIA-TV) and was moved to channel 11 in order to resolve interference with channel 9 at Rome, Georgia. (The channel 8 allocation was then moved to Athens and reserved for non-commercial educational use; it is now WGTV, a PBS member station, and also the flagship television station of Georgia Public Broadcasting.) Due to the way the 1950–51 transactions were structured legally, WXIA operates under the license originally granted to WSB-TV in 1948, while the latter's present license is a new one dating from 1951.

With the move to channel 2, WSB-TV significantly increased its coverage area; it now provided at least secondary coverage from the Tennessee-Georgia state line to Albany, as far west as the Alabama-Georgia line, and as far east as the outer fringes of Upstate South Carolina. The analog channel 2 signal traveled a very long distance under normal conditions, and WSB-TV could now better penetrate the more rugged parts of the north Georgia mountains.

In 1956, the WSB stations moved into the noted "White Columns" building, designed and built according to the Colonial Revival style, a defining characteristic of Atlanta architecture. They would remain there for 43 years, until a much more modernist concrete and glass facility was built adjacent to it (on the same property) in 1998. The new building, which has been dubbed "Digital White Columns" by some, is located just off Atlanta's famed Peachtree Street, on the dead-end northern portion of West Peachtree Street which is actually east of Peachtree Street. This is near the Brookwood Hills area, and just east of the "Brookwood split", a highway interchange where the Downtown Connector splits into Interstates 75 and 85 on the north end. The older building was razed shortly after the new building was occupied. The original columns that stood on the front portico of the old building were placed in a garden area alongside the new building. Brand new white columns have been placed inside the glass-enclosed lobby of the newer building. WSB-TV is located less than one block south of the building formerly utilized by WXIA when that station moved its operations to WATL's studios in 2008.

In December 1965, WSB was the first television station in Georgia to broadcast live in color, beginning with Ruth Kent's Today in Georgia program.

In 1972, the station aired the name of a murdered rape victim in violation of Georgia's shield law. The U.S. Supreme Court overturned the law in Cox Broadcasting Corp. v. Cohn in 1975.

ABC was the highest-rated network for most of the late 1970s and, at that time, was looking for stronger affiliates across the country, including Atlanta. ABC's longtime Atlanta outlet, WXIA, frequently traded second place with WAGA. However, WSB-TV was the far-and-away market leader despite being affiliated with last-place NBC. In June 1980, WSB announced that it would drop NBC and affiliate with ABC; WXIA subsequently agreed to join NBC. Some network daytime shows changed stations in August, while the full affiliation switch occurred on September 1. In January 1986, the station debuted the current number "2" logo it continues to use to this day.

On July 24, 2018, WSB-TV parent Cox Enterprises announced that it was "exploring strategic options" for Cox Media Group's television stations, which the company said could involve "partnering or merging these stations into a larger TV company". Cox Media Group's president, Kim Guthrie, subsequently clarified to trade publication Radio & Television Business Report that the company was solely seeking "a merger or partnership" and not an outright sale of the television stations.

In February 2019, it was announced that Apollo Global Management would acquire Cox Media Group and Northwest Broadcasting's stations. Although the group planned to operate under the name Terrier Media, it was later announced in June 2019 that Apollo would also acquire Cox's radio and advertising businesses, and retain the Cox Media Group name. The sale was completed on December 17, 2019.

== Programming ==
=== Past programming preemptions and deferrals ===
As an NBC affiliate, WSB-TV preempted programs airing from noon to 2 p.m. in favor of airing a feature film presentation during that time. It would also air at least one film from its lineup in prime time, and it would also preempt the non-NFL-related NBC Sports programs in favor of carrying still another film, plus The Lawrence Welk Show.

In 2004, WSB-TV and the other two ABC stations under Cox ownership (WSOC-TV in Charlotte and WFTV in Orlando) declined to telecast the Steven Spielberg film Saving Private Ryan due to the graphic violence and profanity in the film after the FCC stepped up its vigilance on these matters following the Janet Jackson–Justin Timberlake Super Bowl incident that year. The FCC declared the film as not indecent once the telecast of the war drama concluded.

=== Sports programming ===
The station was the original local television broadcaster of the relocated Atlanta Braves baseball team, carrying the games from 1966 to 1972, until the Braves telecasts moved to WTCG (now WPCH-TV) in 1973. Its sister AM station was the longtime radio flagship of the Braves, carrying the broadcasts for 38 out of the 46 years that the franchise has been in Atlanta, dating back to 1966. Ernie Johnson, Sr., a former Braves pitcher and father of his namesake Turner Sports broadcaster, with future Hall of Fame announcer Milo Hamilton (who simultaneously pulled double-duty anchoring Channel 2's sportscasts during this time) were the main announcers for what was then the largest television network in the history of baseball. WSB-TV also aired all Braves games whenever they appeared on NBC's coverage from 1966 to 1980, and then with ABC from 1981 to 1989, along with The Baseball Network regional coverage in 1994 and 1995, including games 1, 4, and 5 in the 1995 World Series, which the Braves won (games 2, 3, and the clinching game 6 aired on NBC, thus locally on WXIA).

WSB-TV has also been involved with the NFL's Atlanta Falcons; from 1970 to 1979, it aired sold-out games at Atlanta Fulton County Stadium where Falcons hosted an AFC team from NBC, then from 1980 to 2005, Monday Night Football from ABC. The station has served as the local outlet for Falcons games which are a part of ESPN Monday Night Football since 2006, when it moved from ABC to ESPN as part of the NFL's requirements to syndicate cable games to local markets. WSB-TV served as the official local broadcaster of Super Bowl XXXIV, held at the Georgia Dome.

The station airs select Atlanta Hawks games through ABC's contract with the NBA. It also broadcasts Georgia Bulldogs and Georgia Tech Yellow Jackets football games through ABC College Football.

=== News operation ===
Channel 2 Action News Logo

WSB-TV presently broadcasts 48 hours of locally produced newscasts each week (with 7 hours, 5 minutes each weekday; 6 hours, 35 minutes on Saturdays; and six hours on Sundays).

Local news programming has had a strong presence on channel 2 since its debut, and it has led the news ratings in Atlanta for as long as records have been kept. WSB-TV is one of the few Big Three affiliates to carry a midday newscast on weekends (sister stations WFTV in Orlando, WSOC-TV in Charlotte and WHIO-TV in Dayton also offer a half-hour noon newscast on weekends). In addition, WSB-TV's weekend newscast output is larger than that of Fox owned-and-operated station WAGA-TV (channel 5), which offers a larger overall weekly (and weekday) newscast output than WSB-TV.

WSB-TV became the second station in the Atlanta market (behind WXIA-TV) and the second Cox-owned station (behind WFTV) to begin broadcasting its local newscasts in high definition. The first HD broadcast was on September 27, 2006; during its noon broadcast. With the switch came a new HD-ready set and a graphics package designed by Giant Octopus.

In mid-November 2009, reporter Tom Jones and a cameraman escaped serious injury when the telescoping radio mast of their electronic news-gathering van (holding a microwave antenna for the remote pickup unit used for outside broadcasting) contacted 115-kilovolt high-voltage powerlines while leaving the Fulton County Jail. Georgia Power staff were surprised that anyone survived, but the two were treated for minor burns and smoke inhalation at Grady Memorial Hospital and released later in the day. The massive electric spark caused an explosion, left a crater underneath the van, arced to and broke a water main, and caused a brief power outage; the vehicle was a total loss.

In August 2018, WSB-TV added two additional hours to its weekday morning newscast during Good Morning America, an expansion exclusive to its 24-hour streaming channel, WSB NOW, available on its website and apps.

In April 2020, WSB-TV changed the name of its 11 p.m. newscast to WSB Tonight. The station's nightly newscast had been called the Channel 2 Action News Nightbeat since the early 1990s. The newscast began as a nightly update on the COVID-19 pandemic, but the name change appears to be permanent. The Nightbeat name was still used for weekend newscasts, but the station began using the new name for weekend newscasts later in the year. Unlike the Nightbeat, which was a rundown of the day's top stories, WSB Tonight goes into detail about the biggest stories of the day.

On September 5, 2020, WSB-TV became the first station in the Atlanta market to expand its weekend morning newscast to 5 a.m.

==== Notable current on-air staff ====
- Sophia Choi – anchor/reporter
- Linda Stouffer – weekday evening anchor

==== Notable former on-air staff ====
- Sandra Bookman – anchor/reporter (1989–1998)
- Tom Brokaw – anchor/reporter (1965–1966)
- Steve Buckhantz – sports anchor/reporter
- Glenn Burns – chief meteorologist (1982–2022)
- Dale Cardwell – investigative reporter (1996–2007)
- Milo Hamilton – sports director (1968–1976)
- Ernie Johnson, Jr. – sports anchor/reporter (1982–1989)
- Monica Kaufman Pearson – anchor (1975–2012)
- Don Kennedy – host ("Officer Don") of long-running Atlanta children's TV show The Popeye Club (1956–1970)
- Stu Klitenic – sports anchor/reporter (1989–1996)
- Jovita Moore – anchor/reporter (1998–2021)
- John Palmer – anchor/reporter (1960–1962)
- Byron Pitts – reporter (1994–1996)
- Bob Richards – meteorologist
- Hal Suit – anchor/news director (1948–1978)
- Ukee Washington – sports anchor

== Technical information ==
=== Subchannels ===
The station's signal is multiplexed:

Subchannels of WSB-TV
Subchannel			Res.	Short name	Programming
Atlanta	Athens	Gainesville	Res.	Short name	Programming
2.1	2.11	2.21	720p	WSB-HD	ABC
2.2	2.12	2.22	480i	BOUNCE	Bounce TV
2.3	2.13	2.23	480i	Dabl	Dabl
2.4	2.14	2.24	480i	WEST	WEST
2.5	2.15	2.25	480i	ION	Ion
17.3	17.13	17.23	480i	COURT	Court TV (WPCH-TV)

Broadcast on behalf of another station

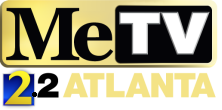
DT2 logo during MeTV affiliation.

WSB's digital channel went on the air on November 21, 1998. The over-the-air digital subchannel 2.2 started carrying the Retro Television Network on January 28, 2008. Prior to this, the channel was blank, or later with a small station ID in the lower corner. RTV programming was replaced with MeTV on June 1, 2011. Later on March 25, 2017, MeTV was replaced with Escape and on September 25, 2017, Escape was replaced with Bounce TV.

In 2021, a simulcast of WKTB-CD's Telemundo subchannel moved to WSB-TV from WPXA-TV. After WGCL-TV's owner, Gray Television, bought WKTB-CD the following year, the subchannel simulcast moved to WGCL-TV's spectrum (remaining mapped to virtual channel 47.1).

=== Analog-to-digital conversion ===
WSB-TV shut down its analog signal, over VHF channel 2, on June 12, 2009, at 12:30 p.m., during a live broadcast from the station's transmitter room on the noon newscast, as part of the federally mandated transition from analog to digital television. The switchover was led by Don McClellan, one of the station's veteran journalists who was celebrating his 50th year at the station during the switchover. The station's digital signal remained on its pre-transition UHF channel 39, using virtual channel 2.

During late August and into September 2009, the station removed its analog transmitter from the top of the tower, and moved its side-mounted digital antenna up from its previous lower location on the tower.

On September 6, 2019, at 9 a.m., WSB-TV shifted from physical channel 39 to 32 because of the spectrum incentive auction, which removed channels 38 to 51 from the television bandplan, repacking those stations into channels 2 to 36.

=== Translators ===
- WSB-TV (DRT) 17 Athens
- WSB-TV (DRT) 20 Gainesville
- WSB-TV (DRT) 17 Newnan (CP)

In March 2009, the station filed applications for two digital fill-in translators (both of which also carry the WSB-TV callsign), due to expected loss of signal strength toward the east and northeast of Atlanta as a result of the shortcomings of the ATSC digital broadcast standard. The station's Gainesville-licensed translator broadcasts on UHF channel 20, and began operations on June 26. It is located on the same radio tower as Cox's WSRV FM and WSBB-FM, and reaches as far into Atlanta's north-northeastern suburbs as Lilburn. The Athens-licensed translator broadcasts on UHF channel 17, with its transmitter located southwest of Winder, and its signal also reaches as far west as Lilburn. WSB-TV requested special temporary authority to begin immediate operation of these stations, pending approval of its regular applications.

The signal coverage of both stations largely overlap with one another, and are almost entirely within the estimated coverage area of the main station; however, distributed transmission (on-channel boosters) would not be used. The translators are intended to overcome the terrain obstructions caused by Stone Mountain to the east of the WSB transmitter, and were in operation by January 2011. The Athens translator uses virtual channels 2.11 to 2.15 instead of 2.1 to 2.5, while the Gainesville translator uses 2.21 to 2.25, allowing viewers to choose whichever station whose signal is better receivable at a given time (certain ATSC tuners may have trouble with two stations using the same virtual channel, and even if not, the user would have to enter the channel number and press "channel-up" or "channel-down" buttons to access the alternates, which would not be separately labeled or identified by the tuner).

In late June 2009, the station also applied for a translator on channel 14 just southwest of Rome. That translator would cover a significant portion of northwest Georgia from the same tower as WQTU (102.3 FM) and WSRM (93.5 FM), and the same site as WGPB (97.7 FM), W212AR (90.3 FM), and W215BA (90.9 FM). The application was dismissed on August 21, 2019. In October 2010, WSB-TV applied for and later received a construction permit for another translator southwest of Atlanta in Newnan on channel 17. This translator would be co-located on the same tower as Cox-owned WALR-FM (104.1), and less than .25 miles (0.40 km) west of another tower holding WRDG (105.3 FM; which is not owned by Cox).

== See also ==
- Channel 2 virtual TV stations in the United States
- Channel 32 digital TV stations in the United States
- List of three-letter broadcast call signs in the United States
