= WSB (AM) =

Clear-channel news/talk radio station in Atlanta, Georgia, United States

- Atlanta, Georgia; United States
- Broadcast area: Metro Atlanta
- Frequency: 750 kHz
- Branding: 95-5 WSB; Atlanta's News and Talk

Programming
- Format: News/talk
- Affiliations: ABC News Radio; Bloomberg Radio; CBS News Radio; Compass Media Networks; Premiere Networks; WSB-TV; Georgia Bulldogs

Ownership
- Owner: Cox Media Group; (Cox Radio, LLC)
- Sister stations: WALR-FM; WSB-FM; WSB-TV; WSBB-FM; WSRV

History
- First air date: March 15, 1922
- Former frequencies: 833 kHz (1922); 619 kHz (1922–1923); 750 kHz (1923); 700 kHz (1923–1927); 630 kHz (1927–1928); 740 kHz (1928–1940)
- Call sign meaning: Randomly assigned; backronymed to mean "Welcome South, Brother"

Technical information
- Licensing authority: FCC
- Facility ID: 73977
- Class: A
- Power: 50,000 watts (unlimited)
- Transmitter coordinates: 33°50′38.37″N 84°15′11.72″W
- Repeaters: 95.5 WSBB-FM (Doraville); 97.1 WSRV-HD3 (Gainesville)

Links
- Public license information: Public file; LMS
- Webcast: Listen live
- Website: www.wsbradio.com

WSB (750 kHz) is a commercial AM radio station in Atlanta, Georgia. It simulcasts a news/talk radio format with 95.5 WSBB-FM. WSB and WSBB-FM are the flagship stations for Cox Media Group which also owns three other Atlanta radio stations and WSB-TV. WSB is among the highest billing stations in the U.S. The station's studios and offices are in the WSB Television and Radio Group Building on West Peachtree Street in Midtown Atlanta.

WSB is powered at 50,000 watts, the maximum for commercial AM stations. WSB is a clear-channel class A station and uses a non-directional antenna. The station's transmitter and radiating tower are seven miles (11 kilometers) northeast of Atlanta at the Northlake Tower Festival Shopping Center, off Lavista Road in Tucker, Georgia. Its daytime coverage area is not as large as 50,000-watt AM stations in other parts of the country due to Georgia's poor ground conductivity; as such, a number of outer Atlanta suburbs only receive a grade B signal. At night, when radio waves travel farther, WSB can be heard with a good radio across much of the Southeastern United States, Gulf of Mexico and Caribbean Sea. Though the station is licensed for HD Radio operations, like many stations, it shut off the capability due to RF interference, a lack of demand for AM stations in the format, and the establishment of WSBB-FM to address audio quality concerns.

== History ==
=== Atlanta Journal ===
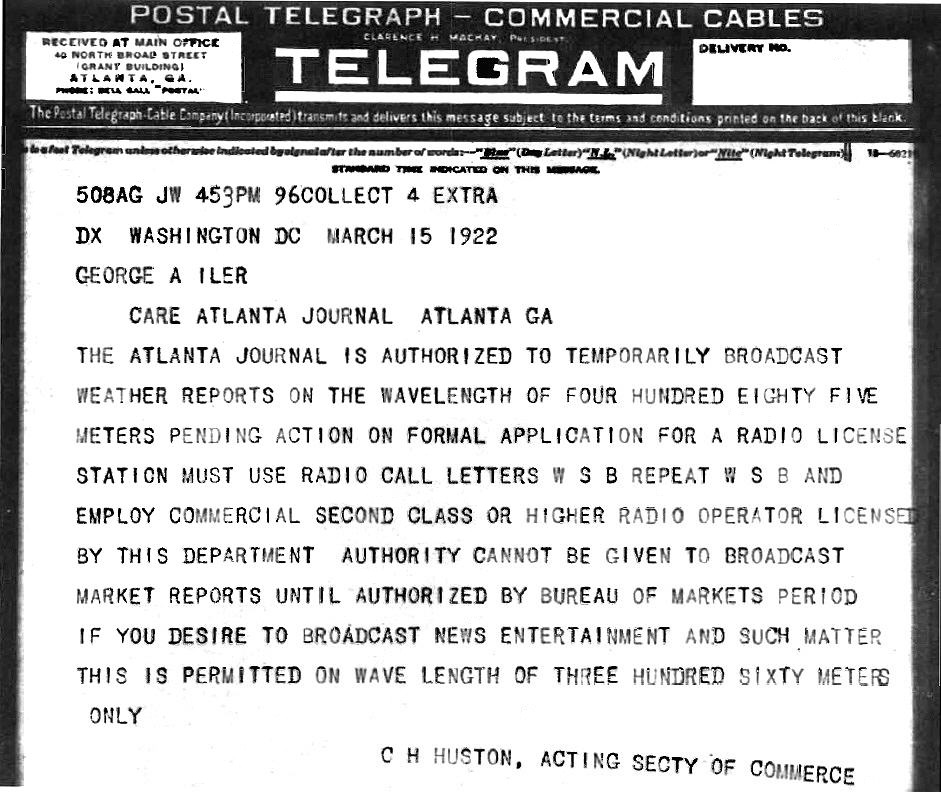
Telegram, sent March 15, 1922, authorizing WSB to immediately begin "news, entertainment and such matter" broadcasts on 360 meters (833 kHz) and, pending authorization, weather reports on 485 meters (619 kHz)

WSB was one of the first radio stations in the South. In early 1922, there was a tremendous public interest in the then-new technology of radio broadcasting. By the end of the year, the number of authorized stations exceeded 500. In many communities, a race broke out to see who would be the first to get a station on the air. In Atlanta, the primary contenders were the two major newspapers, the Atlanta Journal and the Atlanta Constitution. The Journal established a makeshift studio on the fifth floor of its building at 7 Forsyth Street. A transmitter had been ordered, but facing a delay, the newspaper arranged for the equipment used by Gordon Heidt for his amateur station to be temporarily installed. A broadcasting license was normally needed before a station could go on the air, but it was arranged to have an initial telegraphed authorization, which was sent by the Department of Commerce on the evening of March 15, 1922. The station's debut broadcast took place that evening. The transmitter had only 100 watts of power and ice was used to cool the batteries.

The Journal's new station was issued the randomly assigned call letters WSB. Station management would claim the call letters stood for "Welcome South, Brother", even though the Journal did not specifically request those call letters. The Constitution's station, WGM, debuted two days later on March 17. Because it also was transmitting on 360 meters, the two newspapers had to set up a time-sharing agreement allocating broadcast hours. Competition was so fierce between the two that WSB's manager, Lambdin "The Little Colonel" Kay, banned any person who had previously appeared on WGM from broadcasting over WSB.

In September 1922, the Department of Commerce set aside a second entertainment wavelength, 400 meters (750 kHz) for "Class B" stations that had quality equipment and programming. Both WSB and WGM were assigned to this new wavelength. In May 1923, additional "Class B" frequencies were made available, and Atlanta was assigned the use of 700 kHz. Once again, both WSB and WGM were assigned to this new frequency. However, at the end of July, WGM permanently ceased operations, which gave WSB exclusive use of the assignment.

=== NBC Red Network ===
In 1927, WSB became an affiliate of the NBC Red Network. The station carried NBC's dramas, comedies, news and sports during the "Golden Age of Radio". The trademark three-tone NBC chimes were first played in the WSB studios.

In the summer of 1927, WSB began transmitting on 630 kHz. On November 11, 1928, under the provisions of the Federal Radio Commission's General Order 40, WSB was reassigned to a "clear channel" frequency of 740 kHz. WSB was the dominant station nationally on this frequency. In March 1941, as part of the implementation of the North American Regional Broadcasting Agreement (NARBA), WSB moved to 750 kHz, where it has been heard ever since.

Part of WSB's programming was southern gospel music, gaining popularity throughout the region, with shows hosted by Charles Davis Tillman. The Shelby Star newspaper, in an issue dated November 1985, wrote that the talented Dan Hornsby, after the 1929 crash of the stock market, found himself working no longer for Columbia Records. He got work as the first morning show announcer for WSB. Lambdin Kay called Hornsby "90% of the local talent on WSB".

=== Cox Enterprises ===
In 1939, the Journal newspaper and WSB radio station were sold to James Middleton Cox, the founder of what would become Cox Enterprises. Wright Bryan, a WSB news reporter as well as managing editor of the Atlanta Journal, was also a stringer for NBC during World War II. He was the first war correspondent to broadcast an eyewitness account of the D-Day invasion. Bryan reported from London in the early hours of June 6, 1944. Elmo Ellis, who programmed WSB in the 1950s and 1960s, is remembered as an innovator among Southern broadcasters. He provided the on-air editorials for the station, and in the 1960s, consistently supported civil rights.

WSB won a 1946 Special Citation of Honor Peabody Award. It was awarded for its program "The Harbor We Seek".

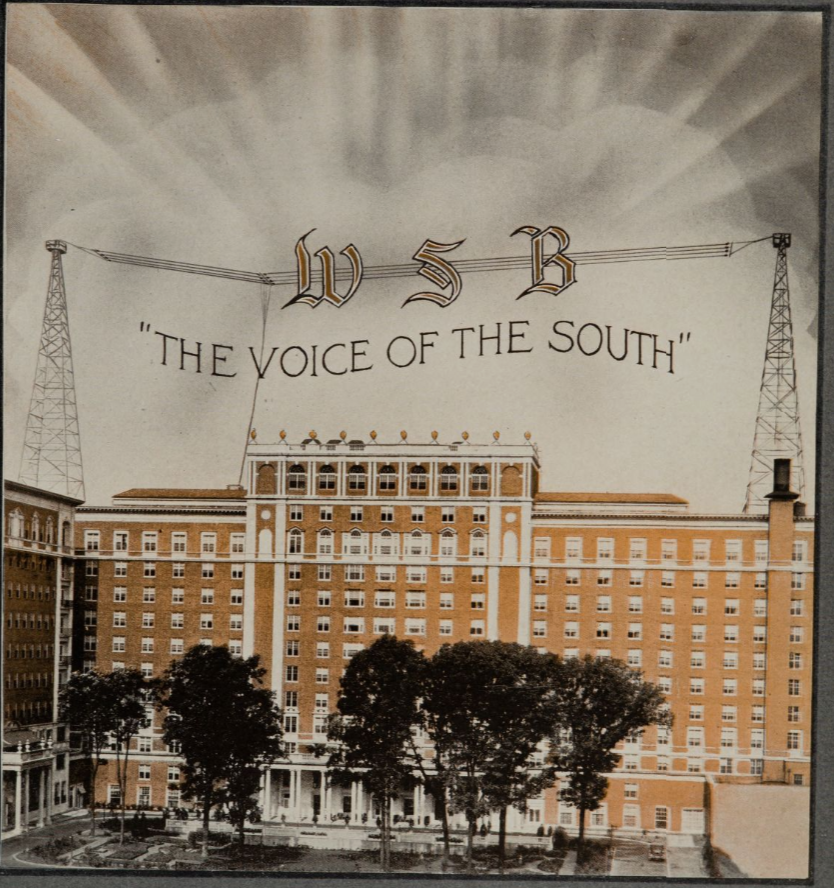
The Biltmore served as the headquarters of the station for several decades

From 1925 to 1956, WSB radio, along with later co-owned stations WSB-FM and WSB-TV, operated out of the top floor of the Atlanta Biltmore Hotel in Midtown Atlanta. Afterward, the WSB stations were housed in a Colonial-style mansion with its interior specially built for broadcasting, informally known as "White Columns". That location was where Peachtree Street crosses West Peachtree Street near Ansley Park. In 1998, all of the Cox's Atlanta radio stations, as well as WSB-TV, moved into a new "Digital White Columns" on the same property. The original White Columns was demolished afterward.

=== FM and TV stations ===
In 1948, WSB added an FM sister station, WSB-FM, originally broadcasting on 104.5 MHz. The Atlanta Constitution had also been experimenting with FM radio, putting WCON-FM on the air the year before. When the two newspapers merged under Cox ownership in 1952, WCON-FM and WSB-FM went silent. WSB-FM returned to the air in 1955 on WCON-FM's dial position, 98.5 FM. While it has the call letters of WSB-FM, the station traces its founding to when WCON-FM first signed on.

During its early years, when few people had FM radio receivers, WSB-FM mostly simulcast the programming on WSB. That included programs from the NBC Red Network, as well as local shows. As network programming moved from radio to television in the 1950s, WSB-AM-FM began airing a full service, middle of the road format of popular music, news, sports and information. By the late 1960s, WSB-FM was separately programmed with a beautiful music format.

Also in 1948, WSB-TV first signed on the air on September 29. It originally broadcast on Channel 8. It is the second-oldest TV station south of Washington, D.C., after WTVR-TV in Richmond, Virginia. Just as WSB aired NBC Red Network radio programming, WSB-TV was originally a primary NBC-TV affiliate. WSB-TV also carried some ABC shows. While Channel 8 was assigned to The Atlanta Journal, Channel 2 was assigned to The Atlanta Constitution, although the Constitution never got its TV station on the air. After the two newspapers came under Cox ownership, WSB-TV moved to Channel 2. The station switched networks with WXIA-TV in 1980 to become an ABC affiliate.

WSB formerly broadcast in AM stereo using the Motorola C-QUAM system during the 1980s, a period when music could still be heard on the station. The on-air talent in this era included morning hosts Russ Spooner and Dick Hemby, as well as longtime Atlanta Braves baseball announcer Skip Caray presenting morning sportscasts. As WSB's format progressed to a full-time news-talk radio format by 1987, the AM stereo system was turned off, as it was superfluous since music had been discontinued.

Also in the 1980s, WSB discontinued its NBC affiliation. Its own news staff delivered all the newscasts, with sound and actualities supplied by AP Radio. In 2018, WSB affiliated with ABC News Radio for its world and national news coverage. Co-owned WSB-TV has been an ABC television affiliate since 1980. In 2020, the station switched to CBS News Radio.

=== 95.5 FM simulcast ===
On August 16, 2010, WSB began a full-time simulcast on co-owned WBTS 95.5 FM, which previously played rhythmic contemporary music under the branding "95.5 The Beat". That October 1, WBTS's call letters were changed to WSBB-FM; the extra "B" was added to the FM call letters because Cox already owns a station with the WSB-FM call sign on 98.5. On July 31, 2019, WSB and WSBB-FM began calling themselves "95.5 WSB". Despite the AM station's wide coverage, 750 is now mentioned, along with WSBB-FM's true call letters, during the hourly FCC-mandated station identification in a rushed form.

Cox Enterprises sold majority control of Cox Media Group to Apollo Global Management on December 17, 2019. While Cox Enterprises retains a minority stake in the company, the sale effectively separated the WSB stations from the Atlanta Journal-Constitution, which remains wholly owned by Cox Enterprises.

WSB's Scott Slade hosted Atlanta's Morning News until February 2023, when he stepped back from full-time hosting. He was succeeded by evening news anchor Chris Chandler, and remains semi-retired as a fill-in host. In April 2023, 31-year morning news host Marcy Williams retired from WSB. She calculated she wrote more than 300,000 radio news stories.

== Programming ==
=== News and Talk ===
WSB and WSBB-FM mostly air local news and talk shows. Weekdays begin at 5 am with Atlanta's Morning News, anchored by Chris Chandler, Judd Hickinbotham and Cheryl Castro. Traffic reports and weather forecasts are featured every six minutes. The WSB Skycopter covered traffic from the air from 1965 to 2024, when parent company Total Traffic allowed the contract to expire. After retiring from his longtime daily radio show in 2020, Clark Howard now provides consumer reports. In middays, afternoons and early evenings, local talk hosts include Erick Erickson, Mark Arum, Eric Von Haessler and Shelley Wynter. At 9 pm, WSB carries The Sean Hannity Show recorded that afternoon. Overnight, repeats of local weekday shows are heard.

Weekends feature shows on gardening, home repair, cars, real estate, health and money, some of which are paid brokered programming. Syndicated weekend shows include Bill Handel on the Law, The Kim Komando Show, Eye on Travel with Peter Greenberg and Face The Nation. WSB and WSBB-FM are affiliates of CBS News Radio, and carry twice-hourly news updates in overnight hours. The stations have a news sharing agreement with WSB-TV.

=== Sports ===
WSB has long served as the flagship radio station for the University of Georgia Bulldogs Radio Network, carrying its football and basketball games. In past years, WSB also served as the flagship station for Atlanta Braves baseball, Atlanta Falcons football and Atlanta Hawks basketball. WSB carried Braves baseball coverage from 1966, the year the Milwaukee Braves moved to Atlanta, until 1991. Braves games moved to 640 WGST from 1992 until 1994.

In 1995, the team returned to WSB, the season in which the Braves won the World Series. That same year, Atlanta Hawks game coverage was also picked up by the station. From 1995 until 2004, WSB branded itself as the "Sports Voice of the South", carrying play-by-play game coverage of Braves baseball, Hawks basketball and Bulldogs football and basketball. In 2019, Braves baseball moved to 680 WCNN. The Falcons and Hawks are now heard on 92.9 WZGC.

== See also ==
- List of radio stations in Georgia (U.S. state)
- List of initial AM-band station grants in the United States
- List of three-letter broadcast call signs in the United States

== Bibliography ==
- "Special Collections and Archives: WSB Radio History" Georgia State University Library Research Guide
- Welcome South, Brother: Fifty Years of Broadcasting at WSB, Atlanta, Georgia. Cox Broadcasting Corporation. 1974.
