= WSB-FM =

Hot adult contemporary radio station in Atlanta, Georgia

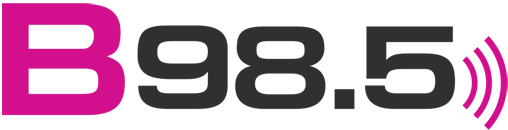
- Atlanta, Georgia; United States
- Broadcast area: Atlanta metropolitan area
- Frequency: 98.5 MHz (HD Radio)
- RDS: B985
- Branding: B98.5

Programming
- Language: English
- Format: Hot adult contemporary
- Subchannels: HD2: Urban adult contemporary (WALR-FM simulcast); HD3: Regional Mexican (WLKQ-FM simulcast)

Ownership
- Owner: Cox Media Group; (Cox Radio, LLC)
- Sister stations: WALR-FM; WSB; WSB-TV; WSBB-FM; WSRV

History
- First air date: 1948 (at 104.5); 1955 (at 98.5)
- Former frequencies: 104.5 MHz (1948–1952)
- Call sign meaning: derived from its sister AM station

Technical information
- Licensing authority: FCC
- Facility ID: 73978
- Class: C0
- ERP: 100,000 watts
- HAAT: 313 meters (1,027 ft)
- Transmitter coordinates: 33°45′33″N 84°20′5″W
- Translator: HD3: 107.1 W296BB (Jonesboro)

Links
- Public license information: Public file; LMS
- Webcast: Listen live; Listen live (via Audacy); Listen live (via iHeartRadio)
- Website: b985.com

WSB-FM (98.5 MHz) is a commercial radio station in Atlanta, Georgia. It carries a hot adult contemporary radio format and is owned by the Cox Media Group, serving as the group's flagship FM station. WSB-FM is the oldest FM radio station in Atlanta. The studios and offices are on Peachtree Street NE in Atlanta, in the WSB-TV and Radio Group Building.

WSB-FM has an effective radiated power (ERP) of 100,000 watts. The transmitter is at the end of New Street NE in the Edgewood neighborhood of Atlanta. It shares the tower with WABE-TV, WSTR-FM and WVEE-FM. It broadcasts in the HD Radio hybrid format; the HD2 subchannel carries the urban adult contemporary format heard on WALR-FM, and the HD3 subchannel carries the Regional Mexican format heard on WLKQ-FM, and also feeds FM translator W296BB (107.1) in Jonesboro.

== History ==
WSB-FM logo until March 31, 2014

=== Early years ===
In the early 1940s, the Atlanta Constitution started an FM radio station. After an experimental period, it became WCON-FM on 98.5 MHz. The call sign contained the letters "CON" for "Constitution". The competing Atlanta Journal had already put Atlanta's first AM station on the air in 1922, WSB. In 1948, the Journal added a companion FM station, WSB-FM, broadcasting on 104.5 MHz.

When the two newspapers merged under Cox Enterprises ownership in 1952, WCON-FM and WSB-FM went silent. WSB-FM returned to the air in 1955 on WCON-FM's dial position, 98.5 FM. While it has the call letters of WSB-FM, the station traces its founding to when WCON-FM first signed on.

During its early years, when few people had FM radio receivers, WSB-FM mostly simulcast the programming on WSB (AM). That included dramas, comedies, news and sports from the NBC Red Network, as well as local shows. As network programming moved from radio to television in the 1950s, WSB-AM-FM carried a full service, middle of the road format of popular music, news, sports and information.

=== Beautiful music ===
In the 1960s, the Federal Communications Commission encouraged large market radio stations to provide separate programming on their FM outlets. WSB-FM would begin airing beautiful music, 15-minute sweeps of orchestral music, mostly cover versions of pop songs, as well as Hollywood and Broadway show tunes. It was mostly automated.

A planned merger of General Electric and Cox in the late 1970s would have caused WSB-FM to be spun off. Noted African-American broadcaster Ragan Henry had plans to acquire WSB-FM and use the call letters WEZA on the station, so it would no longer share its call sign with WSB-AM-TV, but the GE deal did not materialize.

=== Switch to AC ===
In the 1970s, WSB-FM added some soft vocals to its beautiful music playlist. The ratio of vocals to instrumentals continued to increase until March 15, 1982, when the station formally switched to soft adult contemporary music and eliminated the instrumentals.

In the 1980s, many FM stations were rounding off their dial positions on the air; WSB-FM stopped identifying itself as 98.5 and rounded it off to "99FM". In 1985, WSB-FM sued its soft AC competitor WLTA-FM, owned by Susquehanna Broadcasting, which had begun calling itself "Warm 99". Cox Broadcasting claimed trademark infringement, saying listeners would be confused with two Atlanta stations with similar formats using "99" as their dial position. Arbitron was having trouble crediting each station in the ratings because of the common use of "99".

Cox v. Susquehanna Broadcasting became a landmark case in United States district court. The judge was handed a digital radio and asked to tune to 100.0 MHz, but there was no signal. To find the nearest station, he pressed the "Scan" button, and it stopped on 101.5 MHz (WKHX-FM). Next, he entered 99.0 MHz, which, again, contained no signal. Scanning from there, the radio hit 99.7, WLTA's frequency. In his precedent-setting decision, the judge stated that on a radio dial "a radio station's frequency is its address" and one cannot trademark an address. On June 25, he ruled in favor of Warm 99. A short time later, WSB-FM began calling itself "B98.5FM".

=== Competing with 94.9 ===
Another former beautiful music station, WPCH, made the transition to soft AC shortly after WSB-FM in the early 1980s. The two stations were locked in a battle for "at-work listeners" for two decades, with formats designed for workplace listening. WPCH, at various times, called itself "95 WPCH", "Peach 94.9", and "94.9 Lite FM", and even switched its call letters to WLTM. On December 18, 2006, 94.9 flipped to country music as WUBL.

For a year, the soft AC format and WLTM call letters were moved to the weaker frequency of 96.7. When that station (now WBZW) switched to classic country, WSB-FM became the only adult contemporary music station in Atlanta. Over time, WSB-FM would move to a more upbeat AC direction.

=== 2006–present ===
On December 29, 2006, WSB-FM became the Atlanta affiliate for the nationally syndicated Delilah show (which was previously broadcast on 94.9 Lite FM/Peach 94.9). Delilah was dropped from WSB-FM in December 2011.

On July 1, 2008, Steve McCoy and Vikki Locke joined WSB-FM as the morning hosts after 17 years at adult top 40 station WSTR "Star 94". Steve McCoy was let go on February 25, 2010. In March 2011, Kelly Stevens from the old "Kelly and Alpha" show rejoined the station and was paired with Vikki. In August 2012, in the early morning hours one day, Stevens' SUV was totaled by a vehicle driving the wrong way while he was driving to work on the Georgia 400 Freeway. The other driver was killed. Stevens' left leg was broken and left elbow shattered, but he was in good spirits later in the morning at Grady Hospital, when he called in to the show.

In the past, WSB-FM produced an annual "Family Fun Fest" event, where companies that provide products for kids and families would showcase the products and services they offered. The show featured live events and appearances from local sports stars. The station conducted live broadcasts from the location both days of the event. The festival ended in 2009.

During the spring of 2011, WSB-FM shook up its on-air staff and format due to declining ratings. All music before 1980 was dropped, more songs from the 2000s were added, and WSB-FM abandoned the longtime "Atlanta's Best Variety of Soft Rock" tagline. Its slogan became "Your Favorites from the 80s, 90s, and Now", later shortened to "80s, 90s & Now."

From 2001 to 2003 and again from 2009 to 2011, each weekend WSB-FM would play only music from the 1980s. On September 16, 2011, the station changed from "All-80's Weekends" to "80's and 90's Weekends". As of January 2012, 1980s and 1990s weekends no longer air. The station had previously aired all 1970s weekends during the 1990s.

On April 27, 2012, longtime WSB-FM afternoon DJ Kelly McCoy retired after 27 years in the same air shift, after joining the station in January 1985. At 4:00 that afternoon, WSB-FM aired a special tribute during his last show. It was the first time in recent memory that the station broke format during afternoon drive time.

On May 23, 2025, WSB-FM dropped all pre-1990 songs from its playlist, officially shifting to a hot adult contemporary format.

== See also ==
- List of three-letter broadcast call signs in the United States
