= WVEE =

Urban contemporary radio station in Atlanta, Georgia, United States

- Atlanta, Georgia; United States
- Broadcast area: Atlanta metropolitan area
- Frequency: 103.3 MHz (HD Radio)
- Branding: V-103

Programming
- Language: English
- Format: Urban contemporary
- Subchannels: HD2: International hits; HD3: Talk radio (WAOK)

Ownership
- Owner: Audacy, Inc.; (Audacy License, LLC)
- Sister stations: WAOK; WSTR; WZGC

History
- First air date: July 1, 1948
- Former call signs: WAGA-FM (1948–1959); WPLO-FM (1959–1976)
- Call sign meaning: "V-103"

Technical information
- Licensing authority: FCC
- Facility ID: 63776
- Class: C0
- ERP: 100,000 watts
- HAAT: 310 meters (1,020 ft)
- Transmitter coordinates: 33.759°N 84.335°W

Links
- Public license information: Public file; LMS
- Webcast: Listen live (via Audacy); Listen live (via iHeartRadio); HD2: Listen live (via Audacy); HD2: Listen live (via iHeartRadio)
- Website: audacy.com/v103

WVEE (103.3 FM) – branded as V-103 – is a commercial radio station in Atlanta, Georgia, United States. It is owned by Audacy, Inc. and airs an urban contemporary format. WVEE is one of the highest-rated stations in the Atlanta market according to Nielsen Audio, reaching number one on many reports. Its studios and offices are located in Colony Square on Peachtree Street in Midtown Atlanta.

WVEE has an effective radiated power of 100,000 watts. It shares a tower off New Street NE, with WABE-TV, as well as with WSB-FM, which is owned by Cox Radio.

== History ==
=== 1940s ===
The station that became WVEE first signed on the air on July 1, 1948. Its original call sign was WAGA-FM, simulcasting a country music radio format with WAGA (590 AM, now WDWD). They were owned by Storer Broadcasting, a company that owned several top stations in large American cities.

=== 1950s and 1960s ===
In 1959, WAGA-AM-FM were acquired by Plough Broadcasting, a subsidiary of a pharmaceutical company that decided to invest in radio stations. Their call letters were switched to WPLO and WPLO-FM, and the two stations continued to simulcast WPLO's successful country programming.

In the late 1960s, the Federal Communications Commission (FCC) began requiring AM stations in larger cities to end full-time simulcasts, promoting new programming on FM stations. WPLO had Georgia State University students program and host a free form "underground" format, giving the students academic credit instead of pay. The arrangement allowed Plough to have an inexpensive FM presence in the years before FM came to dominate the radio spectrum. It created enough interest among the student body that the Georgia Board of Regents obtained a construction permit and license for its own station at the university, WRAS-FM.

Plough management believed the music programmed by the Georgia State students could become a profitable commercial format if presented professionally. By 1969, WPLO-FM was billing itself as "Atlanta's Alternative High", and described its 103.3 frequency as "103-and-a-third". Program directors in this progressive rock era included Ed Shane, Steve Hosford, and Chris Morgan.

=== 1970s ===
In 1974, as more listeners were switching from AM to FM for music listening, Plough-Shearing changed WPLO-FM's format. Keeping the same call letters, WPLO-FM flipped to country music to build on the AM station's popularity. The AM station continued to have more personality, with frequent news and weather updates, while the FM station went in a more-music, limited DJ chatter direction.

In October 1976, Schering-Plough recognized Atlanta's growing middle-class African-American market by changing WPLO-FM to urban contemporary under the "V-103" moniker and new call sign WVEE. It briefly aired a disco music format in 1976.

When disco fever cooled, WVEE-FM returned to the urban contemporary, and became one of the Atlanta radio market's top stations under the leadership of program director Scotty Andrews. As the first urban station on the FM dial in Metro Atlanta, the "V-103" brand eventually saw other stations around the U.S. follow its formula, including Baltimore sister station WXYV, also known as "V-103", and a Chicago "V-103" (WVAZ, now owned by iHeartMedia).

=== 1980s-1990s ===
In the early 1980s, DKM Broadcasting Corporation purchased WVEE-FM and WAOK. On January 1, 1988, WVEE-FM was sold, along with other DKM-owned properties in Baltimore, Denver, Springfield, Lincoln, Akron, Dayton, and Dallas, for $200 million to The Summit Communications Group, Inc. In March 1995, Summit sold its interests in WVEE FM and WAOK AM to Granum Communications, Inc., owned by Herbert W. McCord, Peter Ferrara, and Michael Weinstein.

In March 1996, Granum Communications sold both stations to Infinity Broadcasting, which was later folded into CBS Radio. Infinity already owned WZGC, which it owned since 1992, that made the three stations a trio-poly.

=== 2000s ===
In 2000, V-103, after many years of operating as an urban contemporary station that only played R&B and classic soul throughout the day and only played hip hop music during early evening hours, added hip-hop music full-time to compete with WHTA ("Hot 97.5", now "Hot 107.9") and WALR-FM (Kiss 104.7, now Kiss 104.1), and to appeal more to the 18-34 demographic alongside the original 25-54 demo. With the gain of more competition, WVEE was one of three adult urban stations between 1998 and 2000 when WAMJ (Majic 107.5) took to the air, although WVEE never called itself an urban AC station.

In 2003, V-103 changed its longtime station slogan from The People's Station to Atlanta's BIG Station to signify its dominance of Atlanta urban radio. WVEE-FM was often #1 or #2 in the Arbitron ratings, along with WSB. In 2008, WVEE-FM reverted to the previous slogan The People's Station to signify its commitment to the African-American community.

Since autumn 2006, WVEE had aired an HD Radio digital subchannel for playing urban adult contemporary (specifically neo-soul) music, with no branding other than "V-103 HD-2". On February 28, 2020, WVEE-HD2 changed their format to international hits, branded as "V-103 International". The HD3 channel is a simulcast of sister station WAOK.

On February 2, 2017, CBS Radio announced it would merge with Entercom. The merger was approved on November 9, and was consummated on the 17th.

== Programming ==
V-103 has a playlist consisting of a balance of current R&B, soul, and hip-hop songs along with throwbacks and recurrents during most parts of the day. During late night hours from Sunday through Thursday, the station airs slow jams from current and old school R&B and soul albums during its Quiet Storm program. WVEE airs a Sunday morning gospel program the entire morning hours, and during the early morning hours on weekdays. On Saturday mornings and Sunday afternoons, the station airs a show dedicated exclusively to classic and contemporary soul music (particularly neo-soul).

WVEE-FM has maintained a strict balance of serving both younger adults and middle-aged listeners since its inception in 1976. This is rare among larger-market urban stations which serve either the mainstream urban or urban adult contemporary audience. Its programming puts it in direct competition with Urban AC stations WALR-FM and the simulcast of WAMJ/WUMJ, as well as mainstream urban stations WHTA-FM, W233BF, and WRDG. In recent years, the station occasionally spins hit crossover pop songs when they are hot on the Top 40 charts.

WVEE was the largest urban station under CBS Radio ownership, and the only CBS Radio urban outlet in the top 10 American radio markets. As of December 2014, WVEE was the only CBS Radio Urban property remaining. Two former CBS urban stations had shifted to Rhythmic Contemporary: WPGC-FM in Washington, D.C., an Urban-leaning Rhythmic, and WJHM in Orlando, which switched formats from Urban to Rhythmic Contemporary in February 2012 (and to top 40 as of February 2014). A third CBS urban station, WPEG Charlotte, was sold to the Beasley Broadcasting Group via a multi-market swap on December 1, 2014. Under Audacy ownership, WVEE is still considered the co-flagship urban station (along with WPGC-FM), but now the largest urban station as WPGC-FM Washington has shifted back to the urban format as of 2018.

== Morning shows ==
From 1998 to 2012, WVEE had been home for Frank Ski and Wanda Smith in the Morning (originally named The Frank Ski Morning Show), when Ski took over the reins from Mike Roberts and Carol Blackmon, after Roberts retired and Blackmon left radio temporarily (now at WAMJ/WUMJ). It consistently maintained one of the highest ratings in the Atlanta region, often finishing as #1 or #2 among morning shows in Atlanta. While the show has almost always been local, it was briefly syndicated to Baltimore (Ski's adopted hometown) on sister station WXYV, as well as in Charleston, South Carolina. Ski was a former host on WXYV (then known as V103) before relocating to Atlanta in 1998, after a two-year stint at rival Baltimore urban station WERQ.

In 2008, WVEE entered a partnership with WUPA to broadcast the Frank and Wanda Television Show, recapping highlights from Frank and Wanda in the Morning for television viewers each night. The theme song for both programs is performed by singer and Atlanta native Monica.

On December 13, 2012, Ski and Smith announced that they both would be leaving WVEE after 14 years. Both said they wanted to concentrate on other ventures. Ski wanted to focus more on family and continue to run his restaurant, while Smith wanted to return to stand up comedy. There were talks with CBS Radio on syndicating the show to other cities but WVEE wanted it to stay focused on Atlanta. The last Frank and Wanda in the Morning show aired on December 20, 2012.

On January 2, 2013, former afternoon host Ryan Cameron was chosen to replace them and assume duties as host of The Ryan Cameron Morning Show. In January 2014, Wanda Smith returned to the station to co-host the morning drive alongside Cameron. As for Frank Ski, he continues to reside in the Atlanta region although he returned to radio as afternoon host for Washington, D.C. station WHUR until August 2015. As of June 2016, Ski returned to WVEE to host weekend shows for the station. On February 2, 2018, Ryan Cameron left the station to pursue opportunities outside of radio.

On February 13, 2018, Frank Ski returned to host mornings alongside Wanda Smith and comedian Joe "Miss Sophia" McIntosh. In January 2019, Smith and McIntosh exited, and the morning drive show was renamed The Morning Culture, hosted by Frank Ski, Jade Novah, and J.R. in February 2019. In July 2020, Ski once again exited WVEE to return to hosting the afternoon drive on WHUR in Washington, D.C. On August 17, 2020, Big Tigger took over hosting the morning drive with the show titled The Big Tigger Morning Show.

== Awards ==
In 1990, 1992, 1995 and 1998, the station was honored by the National Association of Broadcasters with the Marconi Award for "Urban Station of the Year". In 2000, it tied for the honor with WUSL Philadelphia.

WVEE won the award on its own again in 2010 and in 2013.

== In popular culture ==
- V-103 was mentioned in the 1998 movie The Players Club directed by hip-hop rapper/actor Ice Cube.
- V-103 was shown in Tyler Perry's 2009 movie "Madea Goes to Jail".

== See also ==
- KPRS
- WBLK
- WDKX
- WPGC-FM
