= WMGP =

- Hogansville, Georgia; United States
- Broadcast area: LaGrange, Georgia
- Frequency: 98.1 MHz
- Branding: Magic 98.1

Programming
- Format: Classic hits

Ownership
- Owner: iHeartMedia, Inc.; (iHM Licenses, LLC)
- Sister stations: WRZX, WGST, WWPW, WBIN, WUBL, WRDG, WBZY, WBZW

History
- First air date: August 9, 1991; 34 years ago
- Former call signs: WEIZ (1991–1995); WZLG (1995–1999); WISY (1999); WMAX-FM (1999–2002)

Technical information
- Licensing authority: FCC
- Facility ID: 39619
- Class: C3
- ERP: 25,000 watts
- HAAT: 100 meters (330 ft)
- Transmitter coordinates: 33°3′54.00″N 84°57′23.00″W

Links
- Public license information: Public file; LMS
- Webcast: Listen Live
- Website: magic981.iheart.com

WMGP (98.1 FM, "Magic 98.1") is a US rock-leaning classic hits music-formatted radio station that plays hit music from the 1960s, 1970s, and 1980s. The station is licensed to Hogansville, Georgia, and serves the southwest tip of Atlanta and Midwest Georgia area. Since February 2002, it has used the branding "Midwest Georgia's Magic 98.1" and currently uses the branding "Magic 98.1". The station is owned by iHeartMedia, Inc. along with sister stations in Newnan, Georgia, and Atlanta.

== History ==
former logo

The station went on air as WEIZ on August 9, 1991. On September 20, 1995, its call sign was changed to WZLG; it became WISY on July 30, 1999, WMAX-FM on August 2, 1999 (using the branding "Mix 98.1"), and WMGP on February 28, 2002, (as "Magic 98.1").
