= WRZX (AM) =

- Newnan, Georgia; United States
- Broadcast area: Atlanta, Georgia
- Frequency: 1400 kHz
- Branding: Fox Sports 1400

Programming
- Format: Sports
- Affiliations: Fox Sports Radio

Ownership
- Owner: iHeartMedia, Inc.; (iHM Licenses, LLC)
- Sister stations: WMGP, WGST, WWPW, WBIN, WUBL, WRDG, WBZY, WBZW

History
- First air date: 1947; 79 years ago
- Former call signs: WCOH (1947–2021)

Technical information
- Licensing authority: FCC
- Facility ID: 48739
- Class: C
- Power: 1,000 watts
- Transmitter coordinates: 33°21′53.00″N 84°48′42.00″W

Links
- Public license information: Public file; LMS
- Webcast: Listen Live
- Website: foxsports1400.iheart.com

WRZX (1400 kHz) is an AM radio station broadcasting as an affiliate of Fox Sports Radio. Until January 2009, then-WCOH played a classic country format. Licensed to Newnan, Georgia, United States, it serves the Atlanta area. The station is currently owned by iHeartMedia, Inc. as part of the Newnan cluster with WMGP 98.1 and WGST 720, but operated separately from the Atlanta cluster.

== History ==
The station began as WCOH on 1400 kHz in Newnan, Georgia. A surviving station verification card confirms that WCOH was operating by December 4, 1947, identifying the station as "Radio Station WCOH" in Newnan, operating on 1400 kc with 250 watts. A 1947 item in DX News had listed WCOH 1400 in Newnan as reinstated and expected to begin after Atlanta station WATL moved from 1400 to 1380 kHz.

WCOH was originally licensed to Newnan Broadcasting Company. A 1948 Broadcasting Yearbook listing identified WCOH and WCOH-FM as licensed to Newnan Broadcasting Co., which was described as partly owned by co-owners of the Newnan Times and Newnan Herald. Local historical material also places WCOH's early operation in downtown Newnan beginning in 1947.

By 1950, WCOH was carrying syndicated entertainment programming in addition to its local service. Broadcasting reported that WCOH had purchased a package of MGM Radio Attractions programs, including MGM Theatre of the Air, The Story of Dr. Kildare, The Adventures of Maisie, Crime Does Not Pay, and The Hardy Family.

Newnan Broadcasting also operated an FM sister station. In 1952, the company received a grant for an FM facility at 96.7 MHz in Newnan, the facility associated with WCOH-FM and later with other call signs.

WCOH originally operated at 250 watts. In 1960, a Federal Register notice listed WCOH on 1400 kHz with 250 watts and described Newnan Broadcasting Company's application to increase the station's daytime power. In October 1961, Broadcasting reported that the Federal Communications Commission had granted WCOH a license covering an increase in daytime power and the installation of a new transmitter.

In March 1975, WCOH's tower was destroyed by a tornado. The tower was rebuilt not long after in the same location.

By the late 20th century, WCOH was part of the Newnan/Peachtree City radio group associated with Dallas Tarkenton. A 1990 Broadcasting Yearbook group listing associated WCOH and WMKJ with Dallas Tarkenton Stations. In 1995, Broadcasting described Dallas Tarkenton III as president and majority shareholder of Newnan Broadcasting Co., licensee of WCOH.

In 1995, WCOH and WMKJ were sold to Metro South Communications LLC. Broadcasting & Cable reported the price as $1.51 million, with WCOH valued at $250,000; at the time, WCOH was listed as a country station on 1400 kHz.

In January 1999, The M Street Journal described WCOH as a classic country/talk station and reported that Jacor Communications was paying $4.4 million for WCOH, WMKJ, WMXY, and WZLG from related MetroSouth, City of Homes, and Radio LaGrange interests. The station later became part of Clear Channel Communications, now iHeartMedia, through the Jacor/Clear Channel group of stations; later FCC and SEC materials listed WCOH, facility ID 48739, under Citicasters Licenses, L.P.

WCOH later changed from its longtime country and local-service identity to a sports format in 2009. The station is branded as Fox Sports 1400, and iHeartMedia's station site describes it as "Newnan's 24/7 Sports Talk".

On March 26, 2021, an EF4 tornado struck Newnan. The National Weather Service documented the tornado with estimated peak winds of 170 mph and described major damage through Newnan, including the area near Boone Drive and Newnan High School. Contemporary radio-hobbyist reports stated that WCOH's tower was toppled and that the station later returned using a temporary crank-up tower.

On July 9, 2021, the WCOH call sign was changed to WRZX. An iHeartMedia EEO public-file report notes that "On July 9, 2021, WCOH changed its call sign to WRZX", identifying the station as facility ID 48739 in Newnan, Georgia.

As of 2022, WRZX's former studios off Boone Drive in Newnan have been sold and WRZX's transmitter site has been re-located to the WNEA (1300 AM) tower site.
