= WCHK =

WCHK may refer to:

- WCHK (AM), a radio station (1290 AM) licensed to Canton, Georgia
- WCHK-FM, a radio station (101.3 FM) licensed to Milford, Delaware
- WFZZ, a radio station (104.3 FM) licensed to Seymour, Wisconsin, which held the call sign WCHK-FM from 2009 to 2012
- WNSY, a radio station (100.1 FM) licensed to Talking Rock, Georgia, which held the call sign WCHK-FM in 1998
- WBZY, a radio station (105.7 FM) licensed to Canton, Georgia, which held the call sign WCHK-FM until 1993
