= WGST (AM) =

News/talk radio station in Hogansville, Georgia, United States

- Hogansville, Georgia; United States
- Broadcast area: LaGrange - Newnan - West Central Georgia
- Frequency: 720 kHz
- Branding: 720 The Voice

Programming
- Format: Talk
- Affiliations: 24/7 News; Premiere Networks

Ownership
- Owner: iHeartMedia; (iHM Licenses, LLC)
- Sister stations: WBIN, WBZW, WBZY, WRZX, WMGP, WRDG, WUBL, WWPW

History
- First air date: August 12, 1985; 40 years ago
- Former call signs: WMXY (1984–1999); WGSE (1999–2003); WVCC (2003–2020)
- Call sign meaning: "Georgia School of Technology", now Georgia Tech; founders of WGST (920 AM), now WGKA

Technical information
- Licensing authority: FCC
- Facility ID: 39620
- Class: D
- Power: 7,970 watts day
- Transmitter coordinates: 33°3′54.00″N 84°57′23.00″W

Links
- Public license information: Public file; LMS
- Webcast: Listen Live
- Website: 720thevoice.iheart.com

WGST (720 kHz) is a commercial AM radio station licensed to Hogansville, Georgia, and serving West Central Georgia, including LaGrange and Newnan. It airs a talk radio format and is owned by iHeartMedia, Inc. Most programming on WGST is syndicated. It carries Premiere Networks shows from Sean Hannity, Glenn Beck and "Clay Travis & Buck Sexton." On weekends, sports programming from the Fox Sports Radio Network is heard. On weekdays, most hours begin with 24/7 News.

WGST transmits with power of 7,970 watts, using a non-directional antenna, but because it shares AM 720, the same frequency as Class A clear-channel station WGN in Chicago, WGST is a daytimer, required to be off the air at night when AM radio waves travel farther.

== History ==
The station was assigned the WMXY call sign on September 18, 1984; it signed on August 12, 1985, owned by Tharpe Communications and programming an urban contemporary format. Tharpe sold the station to T. Wood and Associates for $5,000 in 1991; L.A. Wood was a principal of both companies. Two years later, WMXY and its FM sister station, WEIZ, were sold to Magnolia Broadcasting for $200,000. Magnolia sold the stations to First Georgia Broadcasting, owner of WKZJ in Greenville, for $145,000 in 1995; the following year, First Georgia sold WVCC and what had become WZLG to Janz Broadcasting for $510,000.

Janz Broadcasting sold WMXY and WZLG to Radio LaGrange for $975,000 in 1997, with a local marketing agreement commencing on December 1; Radio LaGrange's principals owned WCOH in Newnan and WMKJ in Peachtree City. Jacor Communications announced a $4.4 million purchase of all four stations in January 1999; Jacor was itself acquired by Clear Channel Communications (now iHeartMedia) a few months later. WMXY changed its call sign to WGSE on July 12, 1999, accompanied by a switch to a news/talk format; the previous call sign was moved to WKBN-FM in Youngstown, Ohio. The call sign was changed to WVCC on December 22, 2003, and to WGST on July 13, 2020.
