= WJZA =

WJZA may refer to:

- WJZA (AM), a radio station (1100 AM) licensed to serve Hapeville, Georgia, United States
- WWWE (AM), a radio station (1310 AM) licensed to serve Decatur, Georgia, which held the call sign WJZA from 2017 to 2023
- WNND, a radio station (103.5 FM) licensed to serve Pickerington, Ohio, United States, which held the call sign WJZA from 1998 to 2010
- WCKX, a radio station (107.5 FM) licensed to serve Columbus, Ohio, which held the call sign WJZA from 1993 to 1997
