= WGST =

WGST may refer to:

- WGST (AM), a radio station (720 AM) licensed to Hogansville, Georgia, United States
- WBIN (AM), a radio station (640 AM) licensed to Atlanta, Georgia, which held the call sign WGST from 1989 to 2020
- WBZY, a radio station (105.7 FM) licensed to Canton, Georgia, which held the call sign WGST-FM from 1993 to 2000
- WGKA, a radio station (920 AM) licensed to Atlanta, Georgia, which held the call sign WGST from 1925 to 1989
