= WWWE =

WWWE may refer to:

- WWWE (AM), a radio station (1310 AM) licensed to serve Decatur, Georgia, United States
- WJZA (AM), a radio station (1100 AM) licensed to serve Hapeville, Georgia, which held the call sign WWWE from 1996 to 2023
- WTAM, a radio station (1100 AM) licensed to serve Cleveland, Ohio, United States, which held the call sign WWWE from 1972 to 1996
