= WLCL (disambiguation) =

WLCL is a radio station in Sellersburg, Indiana, United States known as WLCL from 2008 to 2011, and again starting in 2014.

WLCL may also refer to:

- WRDG, a radio station in Bowdon, Georgia, United States briefly known as WLCL in May 2005
- WGEX, a radio station in Bainbridge, Georgia, United States briefly known as WLCL in March-April 2003
- WNBL (FM), a radio station in South Bristol, New York, United States known as WLCL from 1999 to 2003
- WBZY, a radio station in Canton, Georgia, United States known as WLCL from 2003 to 2005
- WZVN (FM), a radio station in Lowell, Indiana, United States known as WLCL-FM from 1972 to 1981
