= WKLS =

- Southside, Alabama; United States
- Broadcast area: Gadsden and Anniston, Alabama
- Frequency: 105.9 MHz
- Branding: Rock 105.9

Programming
- Format: Mainstream rock

Ownership
- Owner: Williams Communications, Inc.
- Sister stations: WHMA

History
- First air date: 1992 (as WRHY)
- Former call signs: WKYD (1991–1992); WRHY (1992–2008); WFXO (2008–2012)

Technical information
- Licensing authority: FCC
- Facility ID: 10701
- Class: A
- ERP: 630 watts
- HAAT: 196 meters (643 ft)
- Transmitter coordinates: 33°55′07.1″N 86°04′59.2″W
- Translator: 97.5 W248CE (Gadsden)

Links
- Public license information: Public file; LMS
- Webcast: Listen Live
- Website: rock1059.com

WKLS (105.9 FM, "Rock 105.9") is a radio station broadcasting a mainstream rock format. Licensed to Southside, Alabama, United States, it serves East Alabama including Gadsden, Anniston and Pell City. Named 2015 Radio Station of the Year by the Alabama Broadcasters Association on March 21, 2015, the station is owned by Williams Communications, Inc.

== Programming ==
On-air personalities include Hurricane Shane in the mornings; Lori Ray in the afternoon; Jason Bozeman and "The School of Rock" for your drive home. Weekend programming included normal rotation with weekend personality "Slyder" until his death from a seizure and heart attack on April 6, 2009. News reports are provided by ABC News and Yellowhammer News for local news with Jay Holland. WKLS offers a wide variety of rock from today's artists and includes both Active and Indie rock into their format.

== History ==
The station was assigned the WFXO call letters by the Federal Communications Commission on March 4, 2008, and on October 2, 2012, changed their call letters to the current WKLS. The station moved from Centre, Alabama to Southside, Alabama on August 20, 2013.

The WKLS broadcast callsign was considered a heritage in the neighboring metro Atlanta radio market to the east, where it was assigned to "96 Rock", later named "Project 9-6-1" (now WWPW FM 96.1, "Power 96-1") for over three decades from the 1970s until the late 2012. The WKLS callsign stands for the initials of the founding owners: Don Kennedy, James Lathom, and Arthur Swan ("K", "L", and "S"). They formed the station in 1960 with a $25,000 investment, selling it ten years later for $750,000.
