= W243CE =

Relays WSRV-HD4, Gainesville
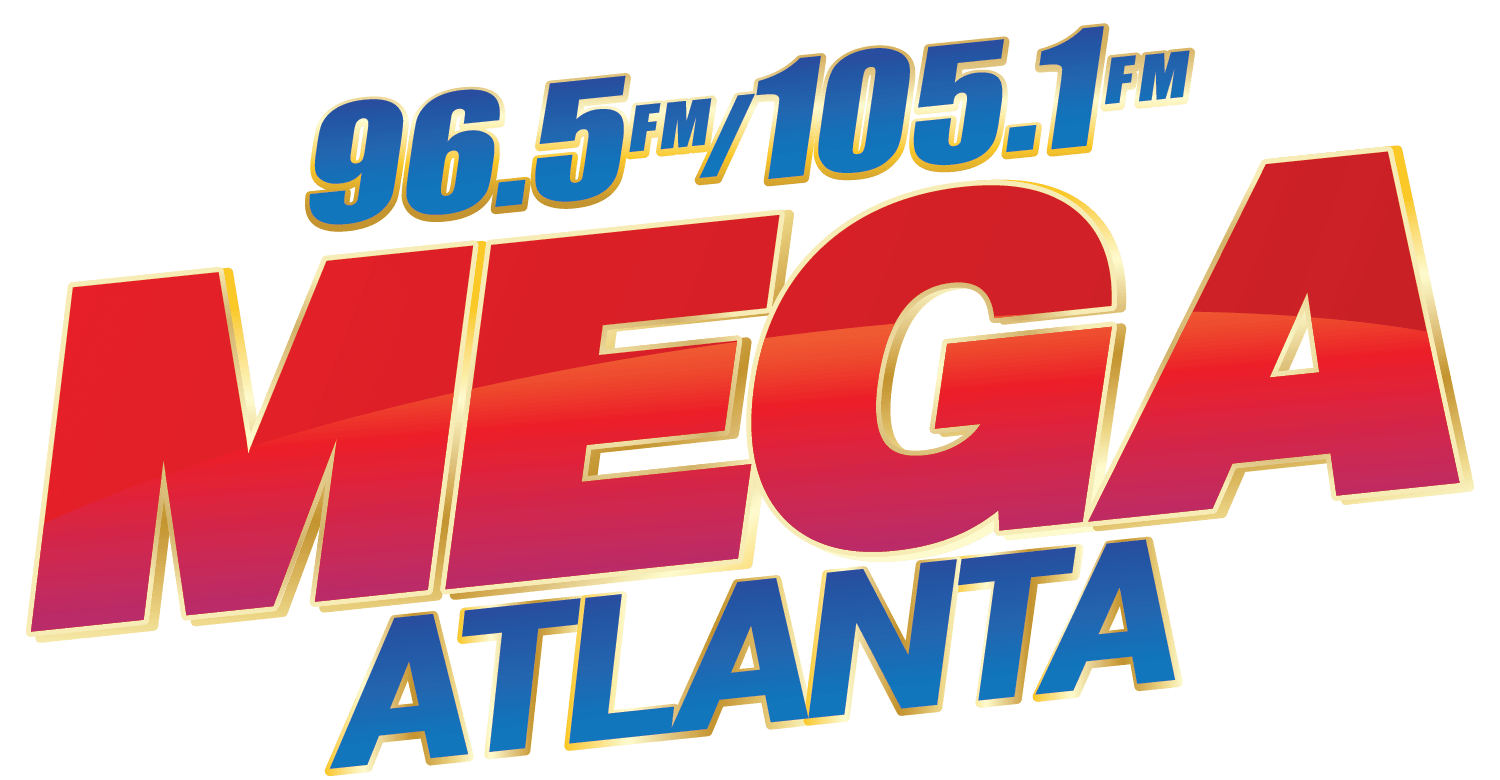
- Winder, Georgia; United States
- Broadcast area: Atlanta metro area (northeast)
- Frequency: 96.5 MHz
- Branding: La Mega 96.5 y 105.1

Programming
- Language: Spanish
- Format: Latin pop

Ownership
- Owner: Davis Broadcasting of Atlanta, L.L.C.
- Sister stations: WCHK, WWWE, WLKQ-FM, WNSY

History
- Call sign meaning: (serially assigned)

Technical information
- Licensing authority: FCC
- Facility ID: 146804
- Class: D
- ERP: 250 watts
- HAAT: 392.2 m (1,287 ft)
- Transmitter coordinates: 34°7′32″N 83°51′32″W

Links
- Public license information: Public file; LMS
- Webcast: Listen Live
- Website: lamega965atl.com

W243CE (96.5 FM "La Mega 96.5 y 105.1"), is a Spanish-language music radio station having Winder, Georgia as its city of license, and previously transmitting from west-northwest of Winder, about halfway to Auburn, Georgia.

In late February 2016, it was granted a construction permit to move all the way southwest to Columbus, Georgia, in the far west-central part of the state, to become the FM side of WOKS AM 1340, with 250 watts ERP on 97.5, at about 53 m (174 ft) in height. Ordinarily prohibited, the long-distance move is allowed under the FCC's "AM revitalization" program, which allows AM stations (but not other low-power community stations like LPFM) to take existing FM translators and the service they provide away from their current areas and use them to duplicate their own service in the same area they already serve.

== History ==
Originally licensed for just five (now 250) watts of effective radiated power, it is owned by Davis Broadcasting of Atlanta. It was originally permitted in 2004 and started in 2007 by Radio Assist Ministry, a company that speculatively filed for thousands of translator stations and then rented or resold them for profit. RAM sold the station to Davis in May 2010.

Before the FCC even approved the sale the following month, it applied for and later received a construction permit to move to the WSRV/WSBB (Cox Radio) tower between Gainesville and Atlanta, increase to the maximum translator power of 250 watts, and exponentially increase its height from 4 meters (13 ft) to 392 meters (1,286 ft). This now gives it the broadcast range of a class-A station, while circumventing Federal Communications Commission (FCC) broadcast licensing, which would otherwise not allow for another station in an already-crowded metropolitan area. The "translator" was and is still entirely within the main station's range, making it redundant if it were serving a translator station's purpose of retransmitting the main analog audio of its parent station.

== Independent operation ==
Although W243CE is licensed as a "broadcast translator" (a service intended to retransmit analog FM stations to distant or terrain-obstructed areas), it is operating independently under an FCC legal fiction that allows such stations to transmit original programming if it is also simulcast on another station's HD Radio digital subchannel — in this case, WSRV's HD3 subchannel on 97.1 FM. Since legitimately licensed noncommercial LPFM stations cannot do any of these things (have multiple stations, operate commercially, use higher powers and unlimited heights, or afford to rent an "HD" channel or AM station) despite being in the same FCC class D, no community radio stations have gone on-air in or immediately around the city since the 1980s, and two have been forced off-air in the 2000s. Other local "translators" originating their own programming include W222AF, W233BF, W250BC, and W255CJ.

Davis also owns a different station in the area: WLKQ-FM 102.3, which ironically has a translator station (W266BW FM 101.1) owned by a different company. That station transmitted from near W243CE's previous location, and was also upgrading and moving.
