= WRZX =

WRZX may refer to:

- WRZX (AM), a radio station (1400 AM) licensed to serve Newnan, Georgia, United States
- WTKD (FM), a radio station (106.5 FM) licensed to serve Greenville, Ohio, United States, which held the call signs WRZX or WRZX-FM from 2014 to 2021
- WOLT, a radio station (103.3 FM) licensed to serve Indianapolis, Indiana, United States, which held the call sign WRZX from 1992 to 2014
