= The Regular Guys =

American radio show

- Other names: TRG
- Genre: Talk Radio
- Running time: 210 min.
- Country of origin: United States
- Language: English
- Home station: WNNX
- Starring: Larry Wachs; Steve Rickman; Eric Von Haessler; Tim Andrews; Bob Whitfield
- Created by: Larry Wachs; Eric Von Haessler
- Executive producers: Tim Andrews; Sebastian "Sebas" Davis; Brandon Joseph
- Recording studio: Atlanta, Georgia
- Original release: 1995-1997 (Los Angeles); 1998-2004; 2005-2006; 2008-2014 – 2017
- Audio format: Stereo
- Opening theme: "Wake Up to the Regular Guys"
- Ending theme: "Wake Up to the Regular Guys"
- Podcast: Yes

The Regular Guys was a terrestrial radio show that started in Los Angeles, California, by DJs Larry Wachs and Eric Von Haessler. The show added Atlanta based DJs "Southside" Steve Rickman and "Action Plan" Tim Andrews when the show resumed in Atlanta, Georgia, during its later runs. Former Atlanta Falcon Bob Whitfield was added to the show during its last run. The show's primary demographic target was men aged 25 to 49.

== Show history ==
=== Origins ===
Larry Wachs and Eric Von Haessler met in the late 1980s and early 1990s, while doing radio and engaging in phone conversations in various capacities in New York. They later sent demos of what work they did together to various markets, ultimately landing interest in Los Angeles. The show was a conversational mix of comedy, skits, and talk-radio, which came to form in 1995 on the Los Angeles station KLSX 97.1 FM. However, Wachs and Von Haessler were later fired from KLSX in 1997 after an on-air meltdown over station management interference with the show, to which the station's management thought differently.

=== Move to Atlanta and the Clear Channel years ===
In 1998, Wachs and Von Haessler resumed the show on Clear Channel-owned Atlanta station WKLS, which was branded as 96 Rock at the time. During The Regular Guys' first stint at Clear Channel, the show was voted "Most Likely to Be Fined by the FCC" in a Creative Loafing (Atlanta) survey. However, Wachs and Von Haessler were never fined by the FCC, in spite of their two firings from Clear Channel.

Wachs and Von Haessler were first fired from WKLS on April 9, 2004, at the height of their Arbitron ratings success, when a graphic interview with pornographic film actress Devinn Lane was accidentally aired over a Honda commercial. That interview was intended to be played backwards, dodging FCC censorship, in a bit called "backwards smut," when the show returned from that commercial break. The intent was to mock the Federal Communications Commission indecency crackdown at the time, which stemmed from the Super Bowl XXXVIII halftime show controversy. Their sidekick "Southside" Steve Rickman was retained by Clear Channel, as he had a different contract.

Wachs and Von Haessler were rehired by Clear Channel in early 2005. They returned to the air on March 21, 2005, on sister station WGST 640 AM. However, the news radio format did not fit their narrative style and they returned to 96 Rock in May. This did not include an immediate reunion with Rickman, as he was doing the afternoon drive time slot with Tim "Rhodsie" Rhodes who previously did the mid-day shift on 96 Rock. Starting around late September 2006, Rickman began making guest appearances on the show on a nearly daily basis.

On October 23, 2006, Wachs and Von Haessler were dismissed from Clear Channel for the second time due to a lawsuit by then Viva 105.7 morning DJs Yogi and Panda. Von Haessler's Mad Pundit Radio program, which was broadcast Saturday afternoons on WGST, was also dropped. The suit claimed that Wachs recorded Yogi and Panda, without their knowledge, while having a discussion in separate bathroom stalls. That recording was part of a bit that was played on the show, which Wachs said was approved by station management.

In March 2007, the criminal case against Wachs was dismissed by the Fulton County, Georgia district attorney for having no merit. Consequently, Clear Channel agreed to settle Wachs' breach of contract claims against them in an agreement under which terms were not disclosed.

== Third Run on Cumulus (2008 to 2014) ==
The show returned to Atlanta airwaves on January 28, 2008, on a new rock station Rock 100.5 which is not owned by Clear Channel, but by Cumulus Media.

In April 2009, it was announced that the show would also be simulcast on KDBN FM 93.3, a Cumulus station in the Dallas/Fort Worth market. The show was later dropped from the Dallas/Fort Worth station in September 2009, due to a format change. In October 2009, the show was once again simulcast to a second market at Rock 105.5 in Macon, Georgia. Rock 105.5 was at the time owned by Cumulus.

In Independence Day 2010, Larry Wachs made a special guest appearance as a clown in Adult Swim's Squidbillies.

In January 2011, the show was given a 3-year contract extension keeping the show on the Atlanta airwaves through 2014.

Eric Von Haessler was fired from the show on September 30, 2013. Co-host Larry Wachs posted on Twitter saying that he made it clear to fans that this was management's decision and not his.

When the show returned to the air after the 2013 holiday break on January 6, 2014, the show's content, time-slot, and run-time had shifted slightly. The show, for the remainder of its existence, aired live from 5:30 AM to 9 AM. Before this, the show had always aired from 6 AM to 10 AM.

By this time, the show started a retool containing more celebrity interviews and pop culture news, while doing less comedy bits and political talk. Past entertaining bits from "TRG 3.0", which is considered to be the 2008 to 2013 time-frame, included Homeless Karaoke and Shoot Steve, among other skits, were dropped in favor of celebrity news. The final "Regular Guys 4.0", in 2014, was geared to have a more positive tone and appeal for the female demographic.

December 5, 2014, marked the end of the show as Larry Wachs was “dumped” by Rock 100.5 management, as the station decided go in a different direction with the morning show. Tim Andrews, “Southside” Steve Rickman, and other members of the show stayed for the station's new morning show. Wachs was replaced by Jason Bailey who spent a year at WZGC before getting let go in the summer of 2014. It is said that Wachs owns The Regular Guys name, so, the new morning show does not carry on under that name.

== Fourth Run on Dickey Broadcasting (2017) ==
The show returned to the Atlanta airwaves on July 24, 2017, on 1230am The Fan 2. During this time the show changed its format from becoming a political talk show to a Sports Talk Show. Larry Wachs brought the show back since he owns the trademark to the name and had Former Atlanta Falcon Bob Whitfield as his Co-Host. Brandon Joseph (formerly of Q100) was hired as the shows producer while John Radcliffe served as board operator. Larry also brought his protege Vinny Bucci back to the show as the Director of Fighting, Conflict, and Drama where he covered combat sports and did Man On The Street interviews. The show was taken off the air on November 14, 2017, due to creative differences.
