= WCCV =

WCCV may refer to:

- WCCV (FM), a radio station (91.7 FM) licensed to serve Cartersville, Georgia, United States
- WCCV-LP, a low-power radio station (97.9 FM) licensed to serve Williamsburg, Massachusetts, United States
- WCCV-TV, a television station (channel 35, virtual 54) licensed to serve Arecibo, Puerto Rico
