= WVCC =

WVCC may refer to:

- WVCC-LD, a low-power television station (channel 6, virtual 49) licensed to serve Westmoreland, New Hampshire, United States
- WGST (AM), a radio station (720 AM) licensed to serve Hogansville, Georgia, United States, which held the call sign WVCC from 2003 to 2020
