= Public file =

Collection of documents that broadcast stations must maintain

A public file (or public inspection file) is a collection of documents required by a broadcasting authority to be maintained by all broadcast stations under its jurisdiction.

Such a file is required by the Federal Communications Commission (FCC) in the United States, and by the Canadian Radio-television and Telecommunications Commission (CRTC). The public inspection file must be maintained at the station's main studio and it must be accessible to anyone during business hours. Stations are required to provide copies at the requester's expense, or if the facility is outside of the community of license, provide copies via mail at their own expense. As of November 2007, the FCC required public inspection files must also be maintained on the station's website, and are optionally distributed to public libraries in the station's broadcast area for the sake of convenience. In these cases, public correspondence from viewers and political reports are usually left out due to cost concerns or misuse of the information provided. The FCC itself began to maintain a site in 2014 where a station can upload their public file components, allowing the public full access to the materials contained within without the restrictions of business hours or a studio visit. The latter move to website access allowed stations to easily close their studios to public access during the COVID-19 pandemic to prevent possible cross-contamination to station employees unknowingly from the public.

All or part of the file may be maintained in digital format as long as it is accessible at the time of inspection.

== FCC-required contents ==
U.S. stations must keep the following materials in their public inspection file:

=== Authorization ===
The instrument of authorization shows the station's frequency, call letters, operating power, transmitter location, etc., as well as any special conditions imposed by the FCC on the station's operation. The license also shows when it was issued and when it will expire.

=== Applications and related materials ===
The public file must contain copies of all applications filed with the FCC that are still pending before either the FCC or the courts. These include applications to sell the station or to modify its facilities (for example, to increase power, change the antenna system, or change the transmitter location). Also, the station must keep copies of any construction or sales application whose grant required us to waive our rules.

=== Citizen agreements ===
Stations must keep a copy of any written agreements they make with local viewers or listeners. These "citizen agreements" deal with programming, employment, or other issues of community concern. The station must keep these agreements in the public file for as long as they are in effect.

=== Contour maps ===
The public file must contain copies of any service contour maps or other information submitted with any application filed with the FCC that reflects the station's service contours and/or its main studio and transmitter location, if there are any, as not all stations are required to have contour maps.

=== Political file ===
Per Section 73.1943 , licensees are required to document each political candidate's broadcasts.

=== Material relating to an FCC investigation or a complaint ===
Stations must keep material relating to any matter that is the subject of an FCC investigation or complaint.

=== Equal employment opportunity file ===
Per Section 73.2080 , licensees are required to keep records related to equal opportunity employment (EEO).

=== The Public and Broadcasting ===
The FCC has a publication entitled The Public and Broadcasting, which must be kept in the file.

=== Letters and email from the public ===
All correspondence from the public must be filed.

=== Issues and programs list ===
All broadcast facilities must keep a list of program material aired for the betterment of the local community. TV stations must have records concerning commercial limits and children's programming, along with their compliance with the E/I rule.

=== Local public notice announcements ===
Upon filing for license renewal, section 73.3580 states broadcast facilities must make public announcements of their intention to continue broadcasting and notify the community that they may comment on the performance of the licensee. Dates and times of these broadcasts must be maintained in the public file.

=== Time brokerage agreements ===
For commercial facilities, a copy of every contract or agreement for brokered time must be available. Local marketing agreements (LMAs) are also included.

=== Must-carry or retransmission consent election ===
Class A television stations are required to document any agreements regarding must-carry or retransmission consent which they have with local cable TV systems.

=== Ownership reports and related material ===
The public file must contain a copy of the most recent, complete Ownership Report filed for the station. This report has the names of the owners of the station and their ownership interests, lists any contracts related to the station that are required to be filed with the FCC, and identifies any interest held by the station licensee in other broadcast stations.

=== List of contracts required to be filed with the FCC ===
Stations have to keep either a copy of all the contracts or an up-to-date list identifying all such contracts they have on file with the FCC.

=== Joint sales agreements ===
For commercial facilities, any joint sales between the two must be documented.

=== Class A TV continuing eligibility ===
Per Section 73.6001 , class A television stations must keep copies of their continued eligibility.

== CRTC-required contents ==
Canadian stations must keep the following materials in their public inspection file:

== Notes ==
The official rules from the FCC are contained in Title 47 CFR Part 73:

- Commercial broadcast services (73.3526)
- Non-commercial/educational broadcast services (73.3527)

Sections 73.3526 and 73.3527 are not applicable to low-power FM and TV stations and applicants.
