= WNGA =

WNGA may refer to:

- WNGA-LP, a low-power radio station (102.1 FM) licensed to serve Talking Rock, Georgia, United States
- WLVG, a radio station (105.1 FM) licensed to serve Clermont, Georgia, which held the call sign WNGA from 2009 to 2018
