= WJZA (AM) =

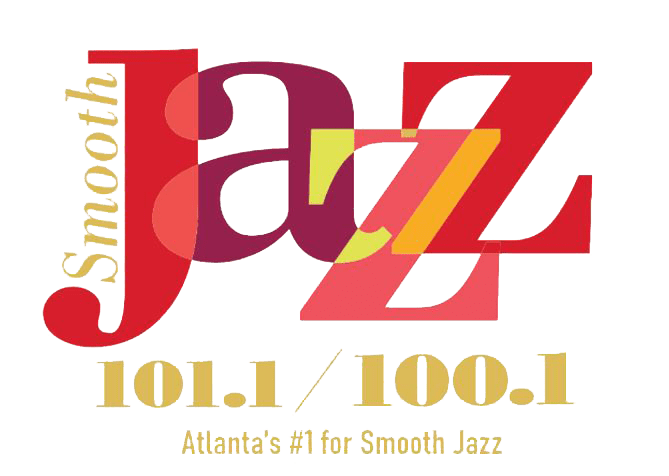
- Hapeville, Georgia; United States
- Broadcast area: Atlanta metropolitan area
- Frequency: 1100 kHz
- Branding: Smooth Jazz 101.1 & 100.1

Programming
- Format: Smooth jazz
- Affiliations: Compass Media Networks

Ownership
- Owner: Greg Davis; (Davis Broadcasting of Atlanta, LLC)
- Sister stations: WCHK, WLKQ-FM, WNSY, WWWE

History
- Former call signs: WLBB (1982–1996); WWWE (1996–2023)
- Call sign meaning: "Jazz Atlanta"

Technical information
- Licensing authority: FCC
- Class: D
- Power: 5,000 watts day 3,800 watts critical hours 500 watts PSRA; 55-58 watts PSSA
- Transmitter coordinates: 33°43′43″N 84°19′20″W
- Translator: 101.1 W266BW (Winder)
- Repeater: 100.1 WNSY (Talking Rock)

Links
- Public license information: Public file; LMS
- Webcast: Listen Live
- Website: smoothjazzatl.com

WJZA (1100 kHz) is a commercial AM radio station licensed to Hapeville, Georgia and serving the Atlanta metropolitan area. Owned by Greg Davis, through licensee Davis Broadcasting of Atlanta, LLC, the station airs a smooth jazz radio format.

WJZA is considered as a Class D station according to the Federal Communications Commission. It broadcasts with 5,000 watts of power during the daytime and 3,800 watts during critical hours, using a non-directional antenna. Because AM 1100 is a clear-channel frequency reserved for Class A WTAM in Cleveland, WJZA must sign-off at night to avoid interference. The transmitter is located off Fayetteville Road Southeast, near Interstate 20 in Atlanta.

== History ==
On August 30, 1996, one Atlanta-area station switched frequencies, making way for another. AM 1100 WLBB Carrollton, Georgia, moved to 1330 kHz and the 1100 kHz signal became the home of a new station, the then-WWWE, licensed to Hapewell. In April 2003, WWWE began carrying the Spanish language evangelical Christian religious format known as "Radio Vida." The station was later re-branded as "La Poderosa 1100 AM," carrying a Mexican ranchera music format. In June 2013, the station was branded as "Radio Fiesta Mexicana" and began carrying a regional Mexican music format.

Former logo

=== Acquisition by Davis Broadcasting ===
On July 12, 2023, it was announced that Beasley Broadcast Group would sell WWWE to Davis Broadcasting, which owns WLKQ-FM Buford, WCHK Canton, and WWWE (AM) (then WJZA) Decatur, as well as a cluster of stations in Columbus, Georgia. The amount of the sale was $250,000. Beasley would continue to own WAEC in Atlanta. Following the acquisition, which was consummated on September 11, 2023, WWWE abandoned its talk radio format and began simulcasting the Spanish language Latin pop format heard on WCHK in Canton, Georgia. The station changed its call sign to WJZA on October 19 and became the primary signal of the smooth jazz format that used to be heard on the 1310 kHz Decatur, Georgia facility.

== History of the WWWE callsign ==
This station is not related to the current WTAM in Cleveland, which held the WWWE call sign from 1972 until 1996 and broadcast on the same 1100 kHz frequency. WJZA must sign off at night to avoid interference with WTAM, which is a 50,000 watt clear channel station, according to the Federal Communications Commission.

== Broadcasting in the hybrid digital mode ==
This station has the equipment for broadcasting in the IBOC digital radio mode, using the HD Radio system from iBiquity. Several other stations owned by the Beasley Broadcast Group use the HD Radio system. On October 13, 2005, WWWE submitted a notice to the Federal Communications Commission of its intention to start digital broadcasting. The station began broadcasting using the HD Radio AM hybrid mode system between 2006 and 2007 on a test basis, but has not continued using this system since.
