= WGAA =

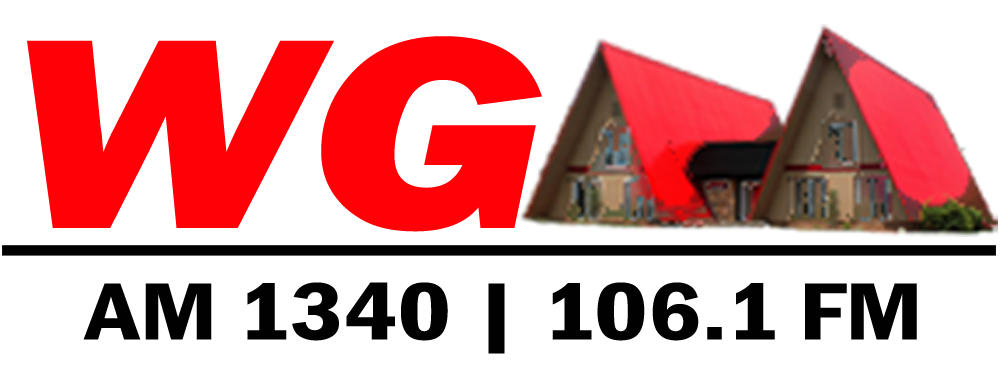
- WGAA AM 1340 | 106.1 FM Logo

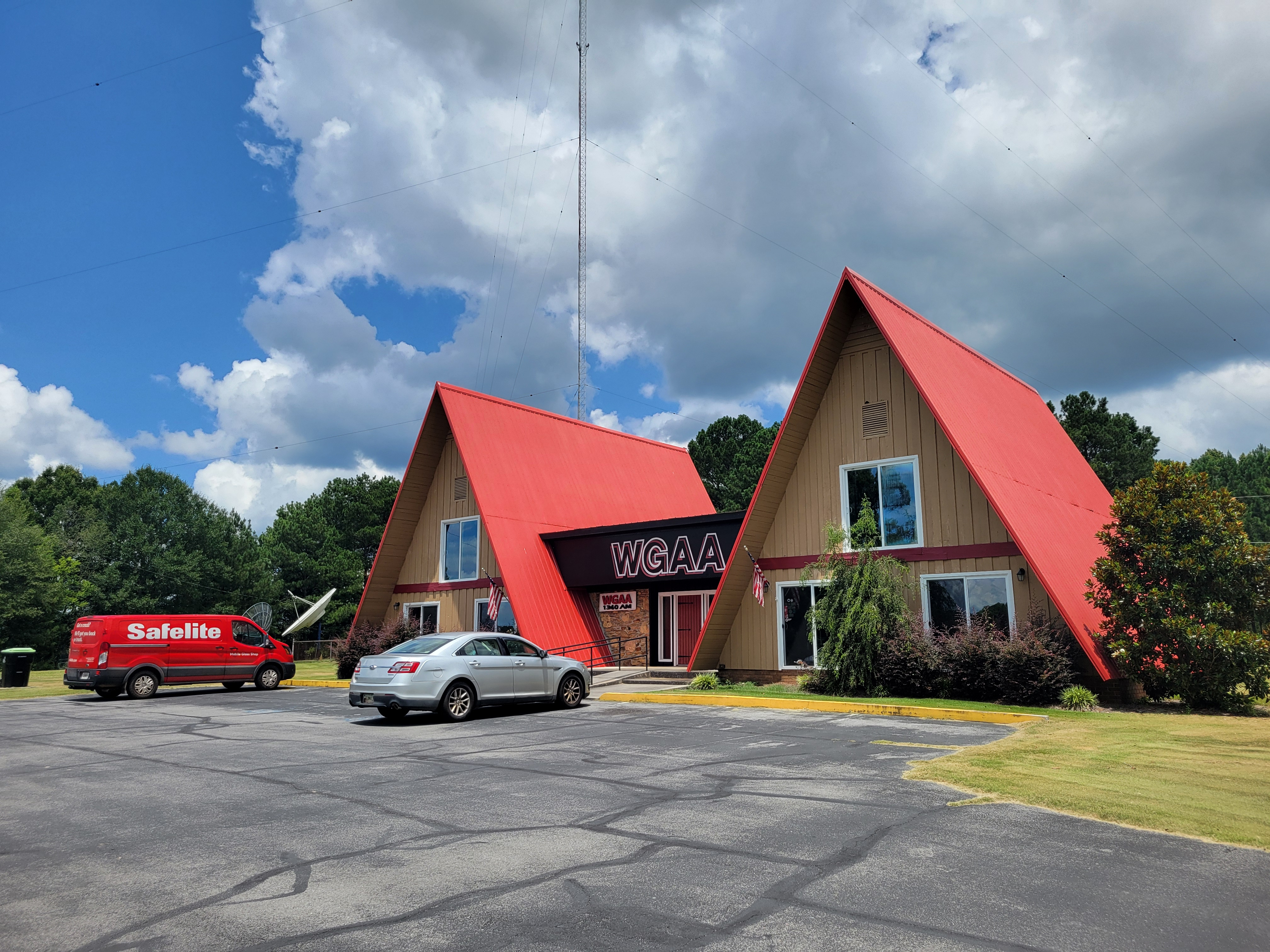
- Cedartown, Georgia; United States
- Broadcast area: Polk County, Georgia
- Frequency: 1340 kHz
- Branding: The Big Double A

Programming
- Format: Classic country
- Affiliations: Georgia News Network, Fox News Radio

Ownership
- Owner: Frank Burgess, Jr.; (Burgess Broadcasting Company, Inc.)

History
- First air date: August 15, 1941

Technical information
- Licensing authority: FCC
- Facility ID: 7829
- Class: C
- Power: 1,000 watts, day/night
- Transmitter coordinates: 34°2′6.00″N 85°15′4.00″W
- Translator: 106.1 W291DN (Cedartown)

Links
- Public license information: Public file; LMS
- Webcast: Listen Live
- Website: wgaaradio.com

WGAA AM 1340 is a radio station broadcasting a classic country format, and has Cedartown, Georgia, United States, as its city of license. The station is currently owned by Burgess Broadcasting Corporation. The station broadcasts a variety of classic country hits from the 1960s, 1970s, 1980s, and 1990s, plus WGAA is the home for Cedartown High School football, basketball, softball, and baseball; the Grapevine; the world- famous Trading Post.

== History ==
The Lam Entertainment Company, which owned and operated numerous movie theaters throughout the south in the early 20th century, launched WGAA 1340 AM and the West Cinema Theater on the same day in 1941, just months before the Japanese attack on Pearl Harbor. The studios were located on West Avenue, in a second story next door to the West Theater. In the early 1950s, the station made the move to its current location on Lakeview Drive, north of Cedartown.

In 1960 the station had a short-lived FM sister station in WGAA-FM (96.1); it was sold the next year to Atlanta interests, and is today's WRDG.

As of August 2018, WGAA simulcasts on its FM translator on 106.1 MHz (W291DN).

== Personnel ==
- President/morning drive: Frank Burgess, Jr.
- Station Manager/News Director: Andrew Carter
- Sports: Sam Branch
- Office Manager: Gail Conner
