= WJCK (FM) =

Radio station in Piedmont, Alabama

- Piedmont, Alabama; United States
- Frequency: 88.3 MHz
- Branding: The Message

Programming
- Format: Contemporary Christian music

Ownership
- Owner: Immanuel Broadcasting Network, Inc.
- Sister stations: WCCV

History
- Call sign meaning: Jacksonville, Alabama

Technical information
- Licensing authority: FCC
- Facility ID: 28334
- Class: C3
- ERP: 2,700 watts
- HAAT: 295 m (968 ft)
- Transmitter coordinates: 33°50′12″N 85°43′59″W

Links
- Public license information: Public file; LMS
- Website: themessage.fm

WJCK FM 88.3, known as "The Message", is a radio station licensed to serve Piedmont, Alabama, United States. The station is owned by Immanuel Broadcasting Network, and serves northeast Alabama from Chimney Peak, just northeast of Jacksonville (from which the "JCK" in its broadcast callsign is derived).

It broadcasts a Christian religious radio format and simulcasts its flagship station, WCCV FM 91.7 in Cartersville, Georgia, IBN's other full-power station. There are also several broadcast translators that retransmit IBN, W216BP FM 91.1 in Fort Payne is the only IBN translator in Alabama, but is assigned to relay WCCV as its primary or parent station.

== History ==
This station received its original construction permit for a 6,000-watt FM station in Cedartown, Georgia, from the Federal Communications Commission on March 23, 1992. The new station was assigned the call letters WJCK by the FCC on April 23, 1992. In May 1994, WJCK applied for a waiver of the FCC's main-studio rule (which requires a radio station to maintain its studios and main offices within the city of license and broadcast range for that station) to allow for the simulcasting of programming from sister station WCCV in Cartersville, Georgia. This waiver was granted on November 2, 1994. After multiple extensions to the construction permit, WJCK received its license to cover from the FCC on January 30, 1995.

In November 1996, station owner Immanuel Broadcasting Network filed an application with the FCC to change the station's antenna height above average terrain, transmitter location, main studio location, and community of license as part of a planned move to Piedmont, Alabama. The FCC granted a construction permit for these changes in June 1997 and construction was completed by March 1999 when WJCK was granted program test authority to begin provisional broadcasting from this new location, but an objection filed in April 1999 by WBRC TV 6 (with analog audio on 87.75 MHz) in Birmingham, Alabama would help keep the station from being fully licensed to broadcast from Piedmont until May 11, 2001.

In March 2019, the station and network re-launched as The Message, with a larger focus on Contemporary Christian music programming.
