= WCHK (AM) =

Radio station in Canton–Atlanta, Georgia, United States

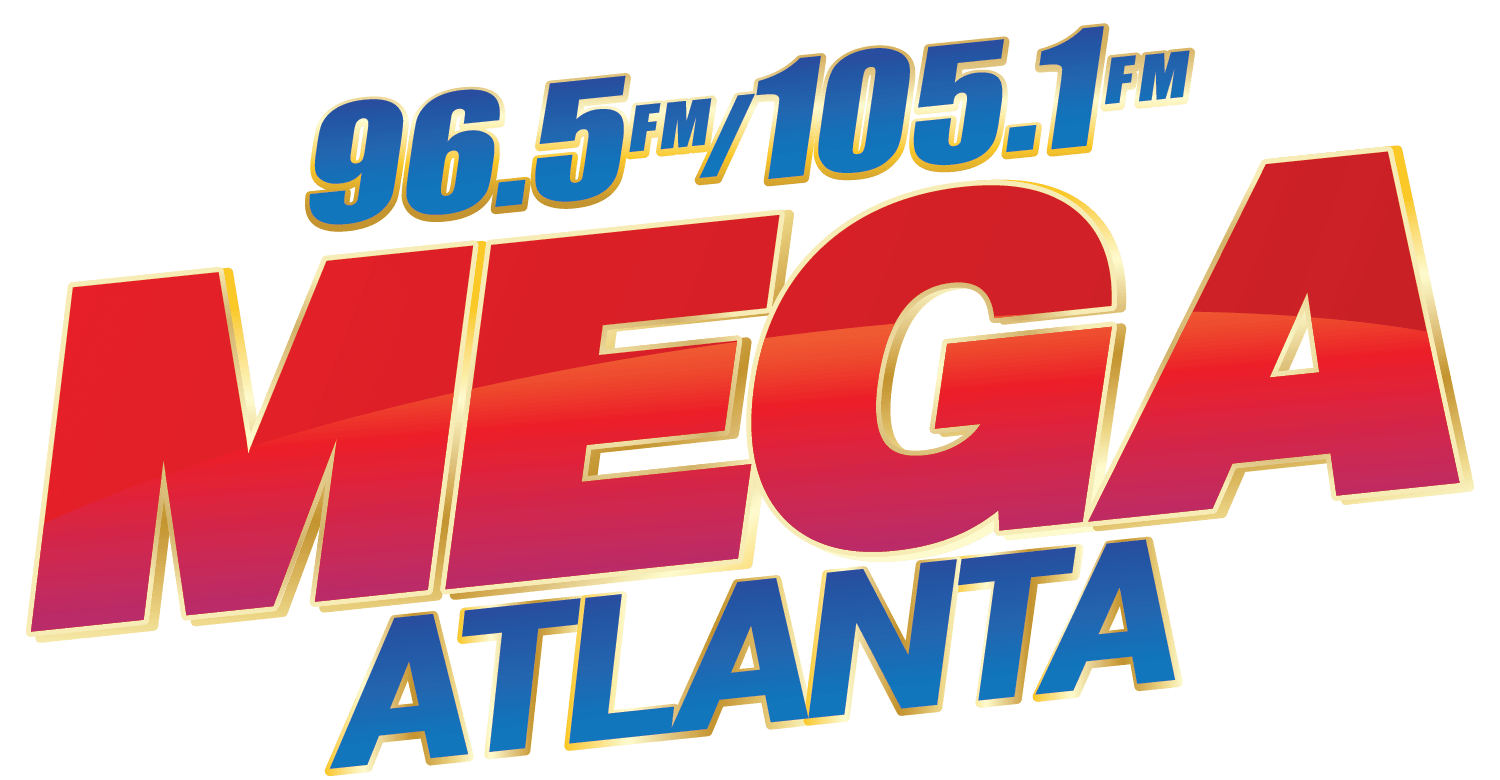
- Canton, Georgia; United States
- Broadcast area: Atlanta
- Frequency: 1290 kHz
- Branding: La Mega 96.5 y 105.1

Programming
- Language: Spanish
- Format: Latin pop

Ownership
- Owner: Davis Broadcasting of Atlanta, L.L.C.
- Sister stations: WWWE, WLKQ-FM, WNSY, WJZA

History
- First air date: April 11, 1957
- Call sign meaning: Cherokee County

Technical information
- Licensing authority: FCC
- Facility ID: 10694
- Class: B
- Power: 10,000 watts day 500 watts night
- Transmitter coordinates: 34°15′8″N 84°27′49″W
- Translators: 96.5 W243CE (Winder, via WSRV-HD4); 105.1 W286DU (Canton)
- Repeaters: 1310 WWWE (Decatur); 97.1 WSRV-HD4 (Gainesville)

Links
- Public license information: Public file; LMS
- Webcast: Listen Live
- Website: lamega965atl.com

WCHK (1290 kHz) is a commercial AM radio station broadcasting a Spanish-language Latin pop radio format, known as "La Mega." Licensed to Canton, Georgia, it serves Metro Atlanta. The call sign stands for Cherokee, the county of which Canton is the seat of government, largest city, and geographic center. The station is currently owned by Davis Broadcasting of Atlanta, L.L.C.

By day, WCHK is powered at 10,000 watts, using a non-directional antenna. But at night, to protect other stations on 1290 AM, it switches to a directional antenna and greatly reduces power to 500 watts. The transmitter is on Keith Drive, near Interstate 575 and Hickory Log Creek in Canton. WCHK is also heard on two FM translator stations: 96.5 W243CE in Winder and 105.1 W286DU in Canton.

== History ==
=== Early Days of WCHK ===
WCHK first went on the air on April 11, 1957, under the ownership of Cherokee Broadcasting (headed by Chuck McClure, owner of Columbus-based McClure Broadcasting). Its programming involved country and southern gospel music, with local production. Among the personalities were station manager Byron Dobbs (retired in 1997), Mike McDougal, and Jim Axel (who moved to WAGA-TV).

==== WCHK-FM ====
Because WCHK was on the AM band with a daytime-only operation, it was required to sign-off by sunset, allowing clear-channel stations to take over the airwaves. Therefore, on August 1, 1964. WCHK launched a simulcast on 105.5 MHz, as WCHK-FM. This allowed the station to extend programming on the FM band by midnight.

In 1991, WCHK-FM received FCC approval to upgrade to a class C2 license. It relocated its transmitter to Bear Mountain, providing greater coverage in north Atlanta. At the same time, the station switched its frequency to 105.7 MHz. Another station from Carrollton, WMAX-FM, later occupied the 105.5 MHz frequency in 1994. (In 2002, WMAX moved to 105.3 MHz; it is now WRDG.)

The station was renamed "North Metro's K-105", then "Country 105.7", and finally as "Atlanta's Classic Country 105.7". WCHK-FM was bought by Clear Channel Communications (now iHeartMedia) in 1993, under a local marketing agreement, simulcasting news/talk station WGST as WGST-FM. (The station is now WBZY.)

In 1998, WCHK launched another simulcast on 100.1 MHz, licensed to Talking Rock, Georgia, under the WCHK-FM callsign. In 1999, WCHK-FM was renamed WNSY, launching an oldies format as Sunny 100. The new station operated from the facilities of WCHK (with personalities Michael Searcy and Scott Evans).

==== The end ====
In the early 2000s, WCHK abandoned its country/gospel format in favor of news/talk. Shows included Ludlow Porch, Dave Ramsey, and local-based Paul Carden. The station also aired a simulcast of the 6PM news from WSB-TV. On July 18, 2004, Chuck McClure, owner of WCHK, died of natural causes.

On November 14, 2006, Davis Broadcasting, owners of WLKQ-FM 102.3 in Buford, made the purchase of both WCHK and sister station WNSY-FM, being completed in January 2007. Afterwards, both stations went off the air on January 22, 2007. WNSY returned to the airwaves on February 1, 2007 as a simulcast of WLKQ-FM (La Raza 102.3), broadcasting a Regional Mexican format. WCHK came back a year later, simulcasting WLKQ.

=== Spanish-language radio ===
In 2013, WCHK switched from Mexican music to a simulcast of W243CE Winder, airing a Spanish Tropical format as La Mega 96.5. W243CE was also heard on WSRV-HD3. In 2015, W243CE and WSRV-HD3 broke from the simulcast, with WCHK maintaining the Tropical format.

On March 21, 2017, WCHK re-added W243CE as a simulcast and relaunched the Latin pop format as La Nueva Mega 96.5/1290. The relaunch is intended to serve the Hispanic communities of North Fulton and Gwinnett Counties.

== FM translators ==
Call sign	Frequency	City of license	FID	ERP (W)	HAAT	Class	Transmitter coordinates	FCC info
W243CE	96.5 FM	Winder, Georgia	146804	250	392.2 m (1,287 ft)	D	34°7′32.4″N 83°51′31.6″W	LMS
W286DU	105.1 FM	Canton, Georgia	203141	100	157 m (515 ft)	D	34°09′14.0″N 84°30′44.0″W	LMS

== Former personalities ==
- Chuck McClure (owner)
- Jim Axel (1957–1959, later moved to WAGA-TV)
- Bob Peterson (1957–1962, Co-Owner)
- Byron Dobbs (1957–1997, General Manager/presenter)
- Steve Bramham (1963–1965, Announcer, Chief Engineer)
- Jackson Bain (1962–1964) later moved to WAGA-TV, then to NBC News
- Chris Morgan (1990)
- Mike McDougal
- Joe Robinnell
- Dick Byrd
- Robert Owens
- Linda Lee
- Don Holt (1968-Feb 1972)
- Scott Woodside
- Jim McGhee
- Paul Carden
- Ashley Frasca Traffic reporter for WSB-TV and 95.5 WSB; host of "Green ad Growing with Ashley Frasca" on 95.5 WSB radio
- Yzzi Evangelista (August 2017 – April 2019, Announcer ) later returned as Program Director, Imaging Director and Announcer from February 2020 - October 2021.)
- Tim (Lawson) Cavender (1974–1987, announcer and Operations Manager of WCHK AM)

== See also ==
- WBZY
- WLKQ-FM
- WNSY
