= Don Kennedy =

American radio personality (1930–2023)

- Born: Donald J. Kennedy; March 2, 1930; Beaver, Pennsylvania, U.S.
- Died: June 29, 2023 (aged 93); Atlanta, Georgia, U.S.
- Years active: 1950–2013
- Children: Rebecca Maple

Donald J. Kennedy (March 2, 1930 – June 29, 2023) was an American radio and television personality and voice talent, whose career began in the late 1940s with a radio announcer spot on Pennsylvania station WPIC.

== Career ==
In the mid-1950s, Kennedy was a contributor to the NBC Radio Network weekend show Monitor, where he developed several features, including one about a local character known as the Goat Man.

Kennedy is remembered as Officer Don, the host of the long-running Atlanta children's TV show The Popeye Club. It was seen on Channel 2, WSB-TV, from 1956 to 1970. During his time at the Popeye Club, Kennedy established 96.1 WKLS (now WRDG), an Atlanta radio station, serving as station president and general manager. The "K" in the call sign was for his last name.

By 1974, Don Kennedy was part-owner of Briarcliff Communications, which had acquired the license of WATL-TV Channel 36, off the air since 1971. On July 5, 1976, Kennedy returned Channel 36 to fulltime operation, from studios located at 1800 Peachtree Rd NE in midtown Atlanta. He sometimes spent late-afternoons in the station's lobby, greeting business visitors such as vendors and messengers, of course while being immediately recognized by Atlanta natives and long-term residents as the iconic "Officer Don" of local "Popeye Club" fame.

Kennedy later did television voicework, playing Tansut in Space Ghost Coast to Coast, and several characters on The Brak Show and Aqua Teen Hunger Force. In 1986, he began hosting Big Band Jump, an internationally syndicated radio show devoted to music from the Big Band era. He later added a second syndicated program, the Don Kennedy Show, that featured general pop vocals and instrumentals from the 1940s through the 1970s, as well as modern renditions from the Great American Songbook. He was also the voice of a kiddie ride based on Superman: The Animated Series made by British manufacturer Jolly Roger, providing a newly-recorded version of the classic Superman radio show's introductory narration.

Kennedy was the recipient of several awards including the Silver Circle Award, two Emmys, awards from the Pioneer Broadcasters and Georgia Broadcasters Halls of Fame, and honorary membership in the Di Gamma Kappa Broadcast Fraternity at the University of Georgia. Kennedy supported several causes, including serving as president of the Georgia Chapter of Muscular Dystrophy, treasurer of the Atlanta Humane Society, board member of the Atlanta chapter of the American Cancer Society, and volunteering as a reader for the Georgia Radio Reading Service for the Blind.

During the summer of 2013, Don Kennedy announced that he would be retiring from radio, ending his work on the syndicated Big Band Jump and Don Kennedy Show. The final broadcasts of both programs took place on the weekend of September 28–29, 2013.

Television character actor Don Kennedy is often confused with radio personality Don Kennedy. Their information and credits are intertwined on the Internet Movie Database. The character actor appeared in many television shows in the 1950s and 1960s such as The Rifleman.

== Death ==
Kennedy died in Atlanta, Georgia on June 29, 2023, at the age of 93. His daughter Rebecca Maple reported that he had been suffering from dementia following a stroke in 2015.

== Partial filmography ==
- Wanted Dead or Alive (1960) : season 2 episode 30 (The inheritance) : Marc
- Aqua Teen Hunger Force (various episodes, 2001–2010) (TV) as Assisted Living Dracula, Vegetable Man & Rubberman (Lance Potter)
- The Brak Show (2001–2003) (TV) as Morlun, Poppy
- Space Ghost Coast to Coast (various episodes, 1994–1999) (TV) as Tansut, Bill Manspeaker, Announcer
- Acme Radio Hour (1995) (TV)
