= WCCV (FM) =

- Cartersville, Georgia; United States
- Broadcast area: Northwest Georgia
- Frequency: 91.7 MHz
- Branding: The Message

Programming
- Format: Contemporary Christian music

Ownership
- Owner: Immanuel Broadcasting Network, Inc.
- Sister stations: WJCK

History
- First air date: January 23, 1983
- Call sign meaning: Christian Cartersville

Technical information
- Licensing authority: FCC
- Facility ID: 28333
- Class: C2
- ERP: 7,300 watts
- HAAT: 285 meters (935 ft)
- Transmitter coordinates: 34°9′34.3″N 85°2′12.8″W

Links
- Public license information: Public file; LMS
- Website: http://www.themessage.fm

WCCV (91.7 FM; "The Message") is a Christian radio station licensed to serve the city of Cartersville, Georgia. The station plays Contemporary Christian music.

The station transmits from Mullinax Mountain, between Euharlee and Wax, Georgia, due west of Cartersville and southeast of Rome (which is slightly closer), the same location for which WTSH-FM applied to move to in early May 2012. Although very close to WCLK (91.9 FM) in Atlanta, it can still be heard in parts of northwest and south metro Atlanta via broadcast translators.

WCCV is also simulcast on WJCK (88.3 FM), a sister station licensed to Piedmont, Alabama. That station had no translators assigned to it until 2010, when W257CM (99.3 FM) was licensed to the northeast of Talladega, Alabama. That translator is now assigned to WRYD in the Birmingham, Alabama, area.

In March 2019, the station and network re-launched as The Message For You, www.themessage.fm with a larger focus on Contemporary Christian music programming.

== Translators ==
Broadcast translators for WCCV
Call sign	Frequency	City of license	FID	ERP (W)	HAAT	Class	FCC info	Notes
W215AY	90.9 FM	Ellijay, Georgia	28336	10	188.6 m (619 ft)	D	LMS	
W216BP	91.1 FM	Fort Payne, Alabama	92631	10	204 m (669 ft)	D	LMS	Out of its broadcast range
W221AW	92.1 FM	North Canton, Georgia	28335	10	272.2 m (893 ft)	D	LMS	
W260AJ	99.9 FM	Ringgold, Georgia	77856	100	148.4 m (487 ft)	D	LMS	
W290CE	105.9 FM	Dalton, Georgia	84026	10	299.6 m (983 ft)	D	LMS	Formerly W236AJ

In addition to the suburban stations in Woodstock and Morrow, Canton is also considered part of exurban metro Atlanta, though "North Canton" is not an official placename. The others are in northwest Georgia, or just beyond. Rossville is a suburb of Chattanooga, their city limits touching at the state line.

In September 2011, the FCC changed the callsign of W265BD back to its original callsign of W265AV, which it had before a change to 100.3 in 1997. In 2002, it was forced to change back to 100.9 when full-power 100.5 was moved in from Alabama. This change apparently occurred when the station received its broadcast license to cover a power increase to 250 watts, which now sends the station as far as Canton, Acworth, Vinings, Alpharetta, and Dunwoody according to official FCC data plotted on Google Maps.

W265AV in Woodstock is still on Sweat Mountain, but had been assigned to retransmit WSB-FM, and in November 2010 was granted a construction permit to go from 7 to 250 watts at the same location and slightly lower height. This indicated it might be used to circumvent FCC caps on excessive concentration of media ownership by Cox Radio in the Atlanta media market, ostensibly rebroadcasting a digital-only channel from B98.5 FM. (The same occurred with unrelated W229AG 93.7, also non-commercial and on Sweat Mountain, and sold to a commercial radio company; other local "translators" have done the same.) As of December 2011 however, it is still broadcasting WCCV, and is now officially assigned to retransmit WUBL.

WUBL is also listed as the primary station for W221CG (92.1) in "Kennesaw" (actually near Hiram/Dallas), which is also owned by Immanuel, and had a permit to move to north of Lithia Springs (its new city of license) at a power of 120 watts on 92.5, which caused its callsign to change to W223BP once licensed in March 2012.

Also recently, Immanuel's W222AF (92.3) in Marietta was assigned to WGST, with a permit granted in April 2011 to go from 10 to 15 watts, and move from the Cobb EMC radio tower in Elizabeth southeastward to between Marietta and Smyrna, in the Laurel Valley apartments along Interstate 75 south of Delk Road. On the weekend of June 19, the station actually made the programming change from WCCV to WGST. Prior to this, an hourly on-air announcement stated that the station would be taken off-air permanently, and that the Woodstock station's power would be raised as a replacement. W222AF was then off the air, and it had a permit to move to the North Druid Hills tower site. It began rebroadcasting WGST via WUBL's HD-R channel 3 (now 24/7 Comedy), but is still owned by IBN. It received a license to cover in early December 2011 after going on at reduced power the previous month, but often still gets heavy RF interference (or is even completely overtaken at night) to the north and west of the city from WDEF-FM in Chattanooga. This includes Marietta, which remains its city of license.
