= Critical hours =

Period of time radio stations lower frequencies

Critical hours for radio stations is the time from sunrise to two hours after sunrise, and from two hours before sunset until sunset, local time. During this time, certain American radio stations may be operating with reduced power as a result of Section 73.187 of the Federal Communications Commission's rules.

Canadian restricted hours are similar to critical hours, except that the restriction results from the January 17, 1984, U.S.-Canadian AM Agreement. Canadian restricted hours are called "critical hours" in the U.S.-Canadian Agreement, but in the AM Engineering database, the FCC calls them "Canadian restricted hours" to distinguish them from the domestically defined critical hours. Canadian restricted hours is that time from sunrise to one and one-half hours after sunrise, and from one and one-half hours before sunset until sunset, local time. U.S. stations operate with restricted hours because of Canadian stations, and vice versa.

Those radio stations that must lower their power during the critical hours are required to do so because this is when the propagation of radio waves changes from groundwave to skywave (at sunset) or vice versa (at sunrise). This can cause radio stations to be picked up much farther away, possibly causing interference with other stations on the same frequency or adjacent frequencies. Usually stations operating under the restrictions of Critical Hours must sign off the air between the end of the evening critical hours and the beginning of the morning critical hours. In effect, permission to operate during critical hours gives daytime-only stations a few more hours in their broadcast day. This is especially important in autumn and winter, when these stations might otherwise need to be off the air during the important morning and afternoon drive times, when AM radio listening is at its highest.

== See also ==
- Pre-sunrise and post-sunset authorization
