= WLVG =

Coordinates: 34°44′55″N 83°43′43″W

- Clermont, Georgia; United States
- Broadcast area: North Georgia mountains; Northeast Georgia; Atlanta suburbs (far NE)
- Frequency: 105.1 MHz
- Branding: K-LOVE

Programming
- Format: Contemporary Christian

Ownership
- Owner: Educational Media Foundation

History
- Former call signs: WHEL (1993–2004); WVWA (2004–2005); WHEL (2005–2006); WZGA (2006–2009); WNGA (2009–2018)

Technical information
- Licensing authority: FCC
- Facility ID: 26854
- Class: C3
- ERP: 7,000 watts
- HAAT: 187 meters

Links
- Public license information: Public file; LMS
- Website: www.klove.com

WLVG (FM 105.1) is a Christian radio station licensed to Clermont, Georgia, and owned by Educational Media Foundation The current format is Christian Contemporary and identifies itself as "Positive & Encouraging K-Love".

== History ==
The station was founded in 1993 by Charles Smithgall as WHEL; in 1998, it was acquired by Jacor, which was sold to Clear Channel Communications a year later. At one point an oldies station, the station soon became a simulcast of WGST AM 640 from Atlanta, and later a simulcast of WWVA-FM (as WVWA). The necessity of the WWVA simulcast was often debated, as the residents of the north Georgia mountains did not understand why a Spanish pop station was needed more than a news station.

In 2005, the station was sold to Sorenson Southeast Radio and operated on a local marketing agreement (LMA) by Douglas M. Sutton, Jr., who is the licensee of several broadcast stations in Georgia and the Carolinas, the station remained silent for several months. On June 1, 2006, Oconee River Broadcasting, LLC signed a programming agreement with Sutton for a three-year period. Upon return to the air, the station held a listener poll to determine the station's format; a rock AC format was chosen and was known as Georgia 105. The station initially reclaimed the WHEL call letters for its city of Helen, but on November 1, 2006, it became WZGA. Oconee River Broadcasting was unable to secure a long-term agreement to own or operate the station. Prior to the expiration of the three-year term, Sorenson filed for consent to reassign the license of WZGA to Sutton's company, Tugart Properties, LLC. On April 20, 2009, the assignment was approved by the FCC. On June 1, 2009, the station reverted to the control of Sutton under his company, Tugart Properties, LLC, the call letters were changed to WNGA and after a short stunting period the station changed to country music. The station left the air on August 10, 2011 due to insufficient advertising revenue. The station is now owned by Educational Media Foundation, and broadcasts the K-LOVE Contemporary Christian format.

As of April 2013, WNGA had special temporary authority to be off the air, apparently pending a change in facilities related to its construction permits. The most recent change, FCC-approved on April 16, moved it from Helen, Georgia to Long Mountain south-southwest of Cleveland, Georgia, between Dahlonega Highway (Georgia 115) to the west and Main Street / Cleveland Highway (both Georgia 11 and U.S. 129) to the east.
