= WLKQ-FM =

Radio station in Buford, Georgia

Coordinates: 34.121°N 83.976°W

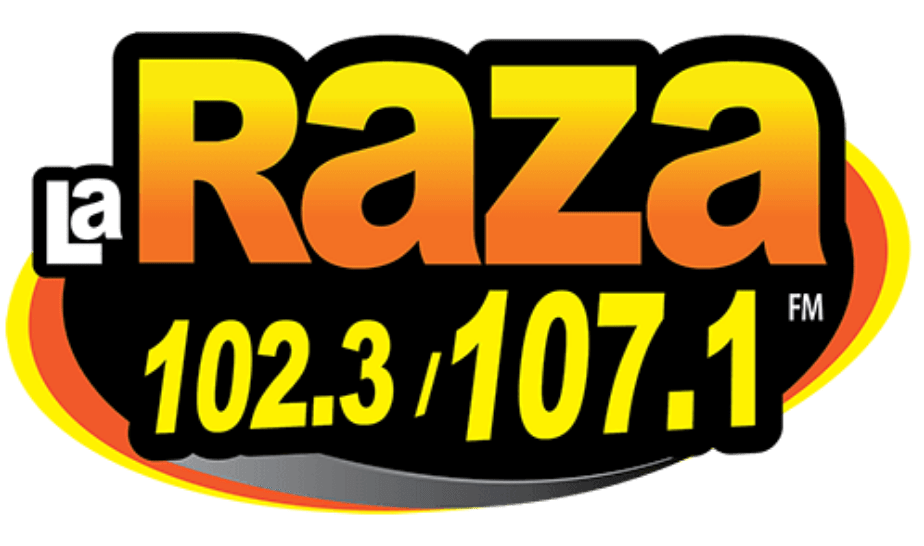
- Buford, Georgia; United States
- Broadcast area: Atlanta metropolitan area
- Frequency: 102.3 MHz (HD Radio)
- Branding: La Raza 102.3/107.1

Programming
- Language: Spanish
- Format: Regional Mexican
- Subchannels: HD2: WVFJ-FM simulcast (Contemporary Christian)

Ownership
- Owner: Davis Broadcasting; (Davis Broadcasting of Atlanta, L.L.C.)
- Sister stations: WCHK, WWWE, WNSY, WJZA

History
- First air date: January 1, 1970 (as WGCO-FM)
- Former call signs: WGCO-FM (1970–1985); WLKQ (1985–1990)
- Call sign meaning: LaKe (former station branding)

Technical information
- Licensing authority: FCC
- Facility ID: 36350
- Class: A
- ERP: 4,200 watts
- HAAT: 119 meters (390 ft)
- Translators: 107.1 W296BB (Jonesboro, relays WSB-HD3); HD2: 92.5 W223CQ (Lawrenceville)
- Repeaters: 98.5 WSB-HD3 (Atlanta); 107.1 WTSH-FM (Aragon)

Links
- Public license information: Public file; LMS
- Webcast: Listen Live
- Website: laraza1023.com

WLKQ-FM (102.3 MHz "La Raza 102.3/107.1") is a commercial radio station licensed to Buford, Georgia, and serving Metro Atlanta. It is owned by Davis Broadcasting and airs a Regional Mexican radio format. The programming is simulcast on 107.1 WTSH-FM in Aragon.

WLKQ-FM has an effective radiated power (ERP) of 4,200 watts. Its transmitter is off Radio Park Drive in Buford, near Interstate 985. WLKQ-FM broadcasts in the HD Radio hybrid format. Its HD2 subchannel carries a Christian Contemporary music format known as The JOY FM. Its programming is also heard on FM translator station W223CQ at 92.5 MHz in Lawrenceville.

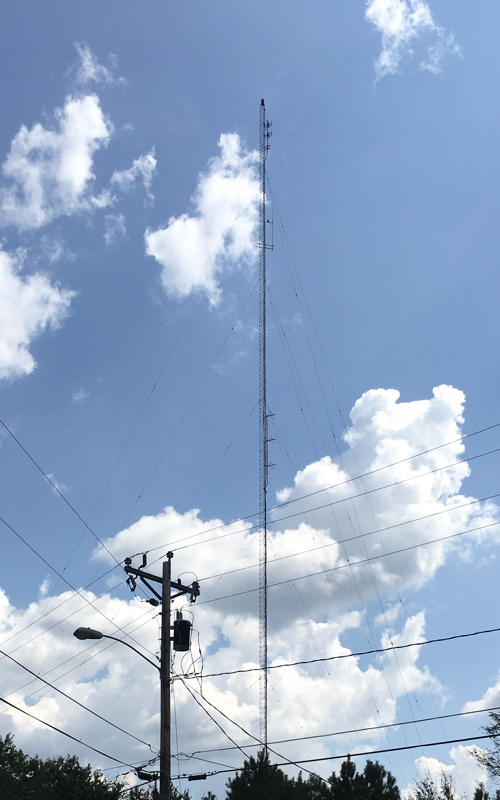
The single broadcasting antenna tower used by WXEM and WLKQ-FM as seen from the northwest in Buford, Georgia.

== History ==
On January 1, 1970, the station first signed on as WGCO. It was owned by the Buford Broadcasting Company, along with AM 1460 WDYX (now WXEM). The station aired a mix of country music and Christian radio programming.

In 1985, Buford Broadcasting was acquired by the Joseph Family. WCGO-FM's call sign was changed to WLKQ-FM, using the moniker "Lake 102 FM." It began playing an oldies format, and with members of the Joseph Family serving in various roles, "Skipper Bob" was president and general sales manager, his wife Jackie as office manager, son Mark as general manager, and daughter Kathleen, known by her air name as "Kay Mackie."

During the 1990s, on-air personalities included Ron Lucas (Ron Lapann), a former tug boat captain, Rick Dennis, Mike Lindsey, Steve Nichols, Ron Ricks and Sue Ryder, who later became a traffic reporter for 750 WSB using the air name Robin Reese. In its final years as an oldies station, personalities included Huey Lewis (McKeller), Vic Andrews (Cuvo), "Captain" Craig Kelley, Randy Robins, Karl Phillips and Rick Bagley (Ryan Bagnal). Lake 102 covered the high school game of the week announced by Mark Blumen. Sideline reports were by Jeff Taves. The radio station sales department was led by Al Garner, once the manager of soul music icon James Brown. The radio station operated profitably for many years.

Eventually the Joseph Family was offered a large price to sell the station, to be targeted to the expanding Spanish-speaking population within the coverage area of the station's former 6,000-watt signal. In 2003, Davis Broadcasting paid $5.25 million to acquire WLKQ-FM. The Oldies format ended in April 2004, as the station began broadcasting Regional Mexican music.

On September 24, 2018, WLKQ-FM began simulcasting on WTSH-FM (107.1) in Aragon, and rebranded as "La Raza 102.3/107.1". Previously, WNSY (100.1 FM) in Talking Rock, had been WLKQ-FM's simulcast partner. (That station now simulcasts the Smooth Jazz format of co-owned WWWE (1310 AM).)
