= Pre-sunrise and post-sunset authorization =

Permission for AM broadcasting in United States

In USA AM broadcasting, presunrise authorization (PSRA) and postsunset authorization (PSSA) are permission from the Federal Communications Commission to broadcast in AM on mediumwave using a power level higher than what would normally be permitted prior to sunrise/after sunset, or in the latter case, provide Class D stations with service into the evening where they would otherwise be required to sign off. Sunrise and sunset times are provided on the licensee's basic instrument of authorization.

The power level for both PSRA and PSSA service cannot exceed 500 watts. Power calculations are based on co-channel stations.

== PSRA ==
At 6:00am local time, stations may power up using the station's daytime antenna (if applicable).

=== Daylight saving ===
Provided the locale participates in daylight saving time, special provisions must be made since the PSRA time is based on local time. The exact wording of the rule states:

Between the first Sunday in April and the end of the month of April, Class D stations will be permitted to conduct pre-sunrise operation beginning at 6 a.m. local time with a maximum power of 500 watts (not to exceed the station's regular daytime or critical hours power)...

For example, if the instrument of authorization states sunrise as being at 5:30am local standard time in April, the station does not require PSRA operation since sunrise time is prior to the 6:00am rule. When the clocks advance, this becomes 6:30am local time. PSRA will permit the station to power up at 5:00am standard time, since that would be 6:00am advanced time and local time would reflect the advanced time.

As of 2007 (when the new US daylight saving times went into effect), the FCC instructed licensees to use the April advanced times when DST goes into effect in March.

== PSSA ==
At sunset, Class D stations must sign off if they do not possess a nighttime license. PSSA operation allows the station to remain on the air an additional two hours at reduced power level determined by several factors:

- International boundaries
- Class A Clear-channel stations
- Whether the station is on a Regional channel

=== Daylight saving ===
There are no specific provisions related to daylight saving time within PSSA operation.

=== Exceptions ===
PSSA operation must cease at local sunset time for the closest co-channel Class A located west of the Class D station.

Class D stations west of a co-channel Class A do not qualify.

== History ==
The first presunrise authorizations came from a proposed rulemaking in 1967 (Operation by Standard Broadcast Stations, 8 FCC 2d 698 (1967)). There were major concerns of skywave interference to clear channel stations, so only a handful of stations were permitted to apply.

On February 25, 1981, the FCC determined that there were no detrimental effects to clear-channel stations in remote areas, therefore, they permitted even more stations to apply for authorization.

== Current authorization ==
Applications for PSRA and PSSA operation are no longer required. The licensee must merely notify the FCC.
