= WWWE (AM) =

Simulcasts WCHK Canton
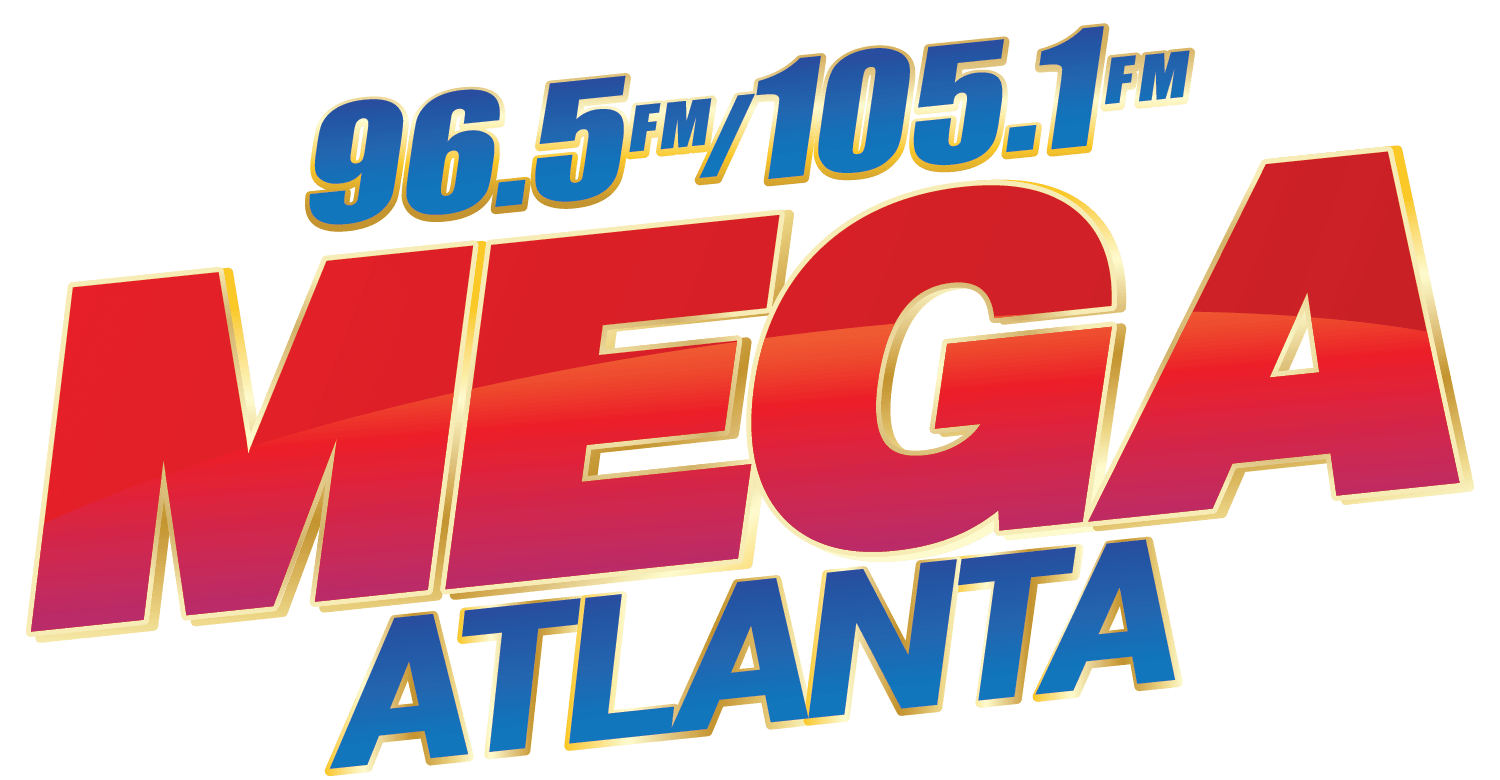

Decatur, Georgia; United States
- Broadcast area: Atlanta metropolitan area
- Frequency: 1310 kHz
- Branding: La Mega 96.5 y 105.1

Programming
- Language: Spanish
- Format: Latin pop

Ownership
- Owner: Davis Broadcasting, Inc.; (Davis Broadcasting of Atlanta, L.L.C.)
- Sister stations: WCHK, WJZA, WNSY, WLKQ-FM

History
- First air date: 2017
- Former call signs: WLKB (1962–1964); WOMN (1964–1973); WQAK (1973–1977); WXLL (1977–1998); WPBC (1998–2017); WJZA (2017–2023)

Technical information
- Licensing authority: FCC
- Facility ID: 36144
- Class: D
- Power: 2,500 watts day 31 watts night 500 watts PSRA; 61-12 watts PSSA
- Transmitter coordinates: 33.772515°N 84.281643°W
- Translator: 96.5 W243EE (Atlanta)

Links
- Public license information: Public file; LMS
- Webcast: Listen Live
- Website: www.lamega965atl.com

WWWE (1310 kHz) is an American commercial radio station broadcasting a Spanish language, latin pop radio format in the Atlanta area media market. The station is currently owned by Davis Broadcasting Inc. Its city of license is Decatur, Georgia, with its studios in The Russell Innovation Center for Entrepreneurs in Atlanta and offices in Suwanee along with its two sister stations, WLKQ-FM and W243CE.

WWWE is also heard on an FM translator station, W243EE (96.5 FM), licensed to Atlanta, Georgia.

== History ==
The then-WJZA's smooth jazz format was soft-launched in October 2017 and was the first smooth jazz station to broadcast in the Atlanta area since 2012. Broadcasters who work for the station include Art Terrell, Sandy Kovach, Miranda Wilson, Allen Kepler, and Maria Lopez. Programming is also lived-streamed on its website, SmoothJazzATL.

In mid-December, 2012, the then-WPBC came back on the air broadcasting under an agreement with The Talk Radio, LLC, headed by longtime Latino community figure Teodoro Maus. During full-power (2,500 watts) daytime operation, the station aired a Spanish language talk radio format. At night, it featured Reggie Gay's Urban Gospel Music service.

In July 2011, Hanmi Broadcasting, Inc. requested the Federal Communications Commission grant a special temporary authority (STA) for WPBC to go silent after a local marketing agreement (LMA) ended abruptly.

In April 2011, the station entered into a LMA with WZBN's Reggie Gay and adopted WZBN's format of contemporary gospel and holy hip hop music.

WWWE's transmitting tower is located in the middle of a Metropolitan Atlanta Rapid Transit Authority (MARTA) employee parking lot (car park) at the Avondale train station. In 2002, MARTA conducted a study to renovate the entire College Station area known as: Decatur - "Avondale MARTA Station Study Livable Centers Initiative", including the station's parking lot. In 2007, another study was conducted, but there have been no further announcements found online to date. Since 2007, no renovation of the area has begun, and no new announcements have been made by either MARTA or Dekalb county regarding this initiative. Should this plan come to fruition, at some point, this may affect the tower/transmitter site which would then have to seek permission to be relocated in accordance with FCC rules and regulations.

WPBC's programming consisted of a progressive talk format during the week and mostly jazz on the weekends as of August 6, 2010. The progressive talk format moved to Green 1640 AM in Decatur, Georgia in April 2011 upon WPBC's LMA with Reggie Gay's WZBN that brought about the format change to urban gospel.

Prior to August 6, 2010, WPBC broadcast a Korean music and talk format with the "Atlanta Radio Korea" branding. Radio Korea is now broadcasting on WQXI AM 790.

Prior to broadcasting Korean language programming, WPBC broadcast a Latin music/talk radio format with the "Planeta X 1310" branding.

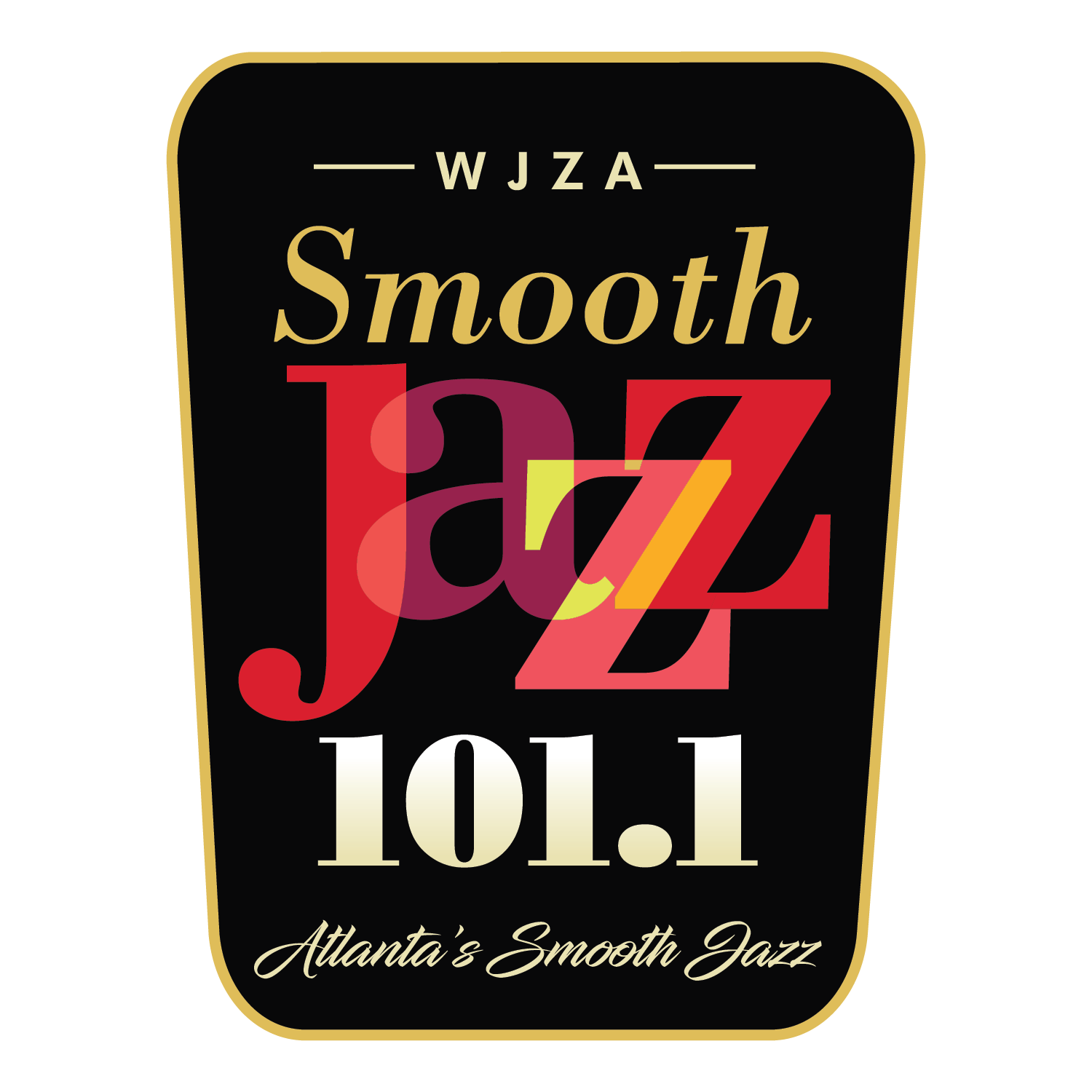
Logo before 100.1 simulcast

Prior to April 2011, weekend programming on WPBC was derived from Broadcast Architecture's Smooth Jazz Network.

Prior to October 2017, W266BW was a translator for WSTR (94.1 FM).

On February 1, 2019, WJZA's simulcast translator, W266BW, was taken off-the-air by the FCC due to interference complaints from WLJA-FM, which is also on 101.1 FM to the north of Atlanta. This is similar to translator W255CJ on 98.9 FM being taken off-the-air by the FCC due to interference complaints from WWGA (also on 98.9 FM) to the west of Atlanta the previous year. The FCC allowed WJZA to turn W266BW back on a few months later.
