= WBZW =

Radio station in Union City–Atlanta, Georgia, United States

Coordinates: 33.490°N 84.569°W

- Union City, Georgia; United States
- Broadcast area: South Suburban Atlanta
- Frequency: 96.7 MHz (HD Radio)
- Branding: El Patron 96.7

Programming
- Format: Regional Mexican
- Subchannels: HD2: Spanish CHR (WBZY simulcast)

Ownership
- Owner: iHeartMedia; (iHM Licenses, LLC)
- Sister stations: WBIN, WBZY, WRDG, WUBL, WWPW

History
- First air date: 1952 (as WCOH-FM)
- Former call signs: WCOH-FM (1948–1985); WBUS (1985–1987); WWER (1987); WMKJ (1987–2000); WLDA (2000–2001); WXVV (2001–2002); WBZY-FM (2002–2005); WVWA (2005–2006); WLTM (2006–2008); WWLG (2008–2013); WRDG (2013–2020); WRDA (2020)
- Call sign meaning: Similar to that of former simulcaster WBZY

Technical information
- Licensing authority: FCC
- Facility ID: 61142
- Class: A
- ERP: 2,100 watts
- HAAT: 173 meters (568 ft)
- Repeater: 105.7 WBZY-HD2 (Canton)

Links
- Public license information: Public file; LMS
- Webcast: Listen Live
- Website: elpatron967.iheart.com

WBZW (96.7 FM) is an Atlanta radio station broadcasting a Regional Mexican radio format. It is owned by iHeartMedia and is licensed to serve Union City, Georgia. It operates from studios located at the Peachtree Palisades building in the Brookwood Hills district of Atlanta, and the transmitter is located in Tyrone.

== History ==
=== Early years (1952–1987) ===
This station began broadcasting in 1952 as WCOH-FM at Newnan, Georgia. The 96.7 frequency began in April 1985 as WBUS, then became WWER in March 1987.

=== Adult contemporary (1987–1997) ===
Just a few months later, it became adult contemporary-formatted WMKJ "Magic 96.7" in November 1987, staying there for well over a decade. The "Magic" brand would be resurrected just one year after the demise of WMKJ when AC formatted "Mix 98.1" WMAX-FM (now WMGP) in Hogansville, Georgia, rebranded as "Magic 98.1."

=== Classic hits (1997–2000) ===
WMGP would shift to classic hits not long after, WHILE still retaining the "Magic" branding.

=== Rhythmic (2000–2002) ===
In October 2000, it became Rhythmic Top 40 WLDA, branded as "Wild 96.7". This lasted for only a year, becoming a simulcast of rock AC-formatted WMXV (Mix 105.7) as WXVV on October 8, 2001.

=== Alternative (2002–2005) ===
On April 5, 2002, WXVV dropped the simulcast with WMXV and flipped to alternative, branded as "96-7 the Buzz". The station also took on new calls WBZY. On May 5, 2005, the Buzz was moved to 105.3.

=== Spanish music (2005–2006) ===
It was then WVWA ("Viva 96.7"), returning to a simulcast in south metro Atlanta of north metro's WWVA-FM "Viva 105.7" (formerly "Viva 105.3"). (This was the first time this broadcast callsign, which had previously been associated with a parody of radio, had actually been legally assigned.)

=== Adult contemporary (2006–2007) ===
On December 20, 2006, WVWA broke from the simulcast again and became adult contemporary as "96.7 Lite FM". The format and moniker and WLTM call letters were previously held locally on 94.9, which flipped to country music as "94.9 the Bull" and adopted new callsign WUBL two days earlier.

When WLTM aired as "94.9 Lite FM", it was the Atlanta affiliate for the nationally syndicated Delilah nighttime show; this was not the case on its 96.7 revival, as her show would be picked up by rival station WSB-FM ("B98.5"), and aired there until it was dropped in 2011.

In March 2007, WLTM became the new home of Paul Harvey in Atlanta after a two-year stint on WYAY-FM "Eagle 106.7". Prior to that, Harvey was heard on sister station WGST.

In November 2007, the station again began playing Christmas music, though with a decidedly more modern and diverse musical style than in its previous years on 94.9, and than competitor WSB-FM. When the format was suddenly moved and changed in December 2006, it ceased playing Christmas music, even though it was before Christmas Day.

=== Classic country (2007–2008) ===
On December 26, 2007, WLTM became WWLG and took the moniker "96.7 The Legend", and began airing a classic country format. During this tenure, WWLG heavily emphasized how they played 10 songs in a row without interruption. WWLG's morning show was hosted by Chris East who also doubled as WWLG's assistant program director and WWLG's program director was WUBL afternoon jock, Lance Houston. From WWLG's launch to around 2009, the station used Roger Alan Wade for voiceover work.

=== Rhythmic (2010–2013) ===
On September 6, 2010, WWLG started simulcasting rhythmic CHR sister station WWVA-FM 105.7, in effort to increase its overall market coverage, mostly in the southern parts of the Atlanta metropolitan area. (The classic country format and "Legend" branding were moved to WUBL-HD2.) The last songs on "The Legend" were "If We Make It Through December" by Merle Haggard and Linda Ronstadt's "When Will I Be Loved", which was then cut in the middle with "Let's Get It Started" by The Black Eyed Peas, launching the simulcast. This marked the station's return to a rhythmic format since WLDA's exit in October 2001, and marks the third time the two stations simulcasted each other. On November 14, 2010, the station changed its name to "WiLD 105.7 & 96.7", retaining the "Atlanta's Party Station" slogan.

=== Alternative (2012–2016) ===
On March 28, 2013, at 11:00 a.m., due to low ratings most likely caused by Power 96-1's launch in August 2012, WWVA/WWLG began stunting with a loop of "What's the Frequency, Kenneth" and "Radio Song" by R.E.M. Just after Noon, the stations became "Radio 105-7", with an alternative rock format similar to 92.9 Dave FM and 99X, which both flipped in late 2012. On April 11, 2013, WWLG's call letters were changed to WRDG, while WWVA's call letters were changed to WRDA.

=== Urban (2016–2020) ===
On November 11, 2016, at 9:23 a.m., WRDG dropped the simulcast of WRDA (who continued with the alternative format), flipped to mainstream urban as "92.3 & 96.7 The Beat", and began simulcasting on translator W222AF FM 92.3 (who also dropped its contemporary Spanish format). "The Beat" launched with 10,000 songs in a row, and began carrying The Breakfast Club (which had previously been heard on W233BF) in morning drive starting December 5. The flip made the pair the fourth current-based hip hop station in the market, the other three being WVEE, WHTA and the aforementioned W233BF.

On April 12, 2018, W222AF was taken off-the-air by its owner because iHeart's lease of the translator expired. W222AF now simulcasts WAKL (106.7 FM).

=== Spanish music (2020–present) ===
On May 4, 2020, iHeart moved the "Beat" moniker, airstaff, and urban format to WBZY (105.3 FM), as that signal has a larger coverage area than 96.7. WRDG continued to simulcast 105.3 FM until May 18, when it switched to a fourth simulcast with 105.7 FM (now WBZY). The WRDG call letters moved to 105.3 on the same date; in turn, 96.7 FM adopted the WRDA call sign and then the WBZW calls on May 26, 2020.

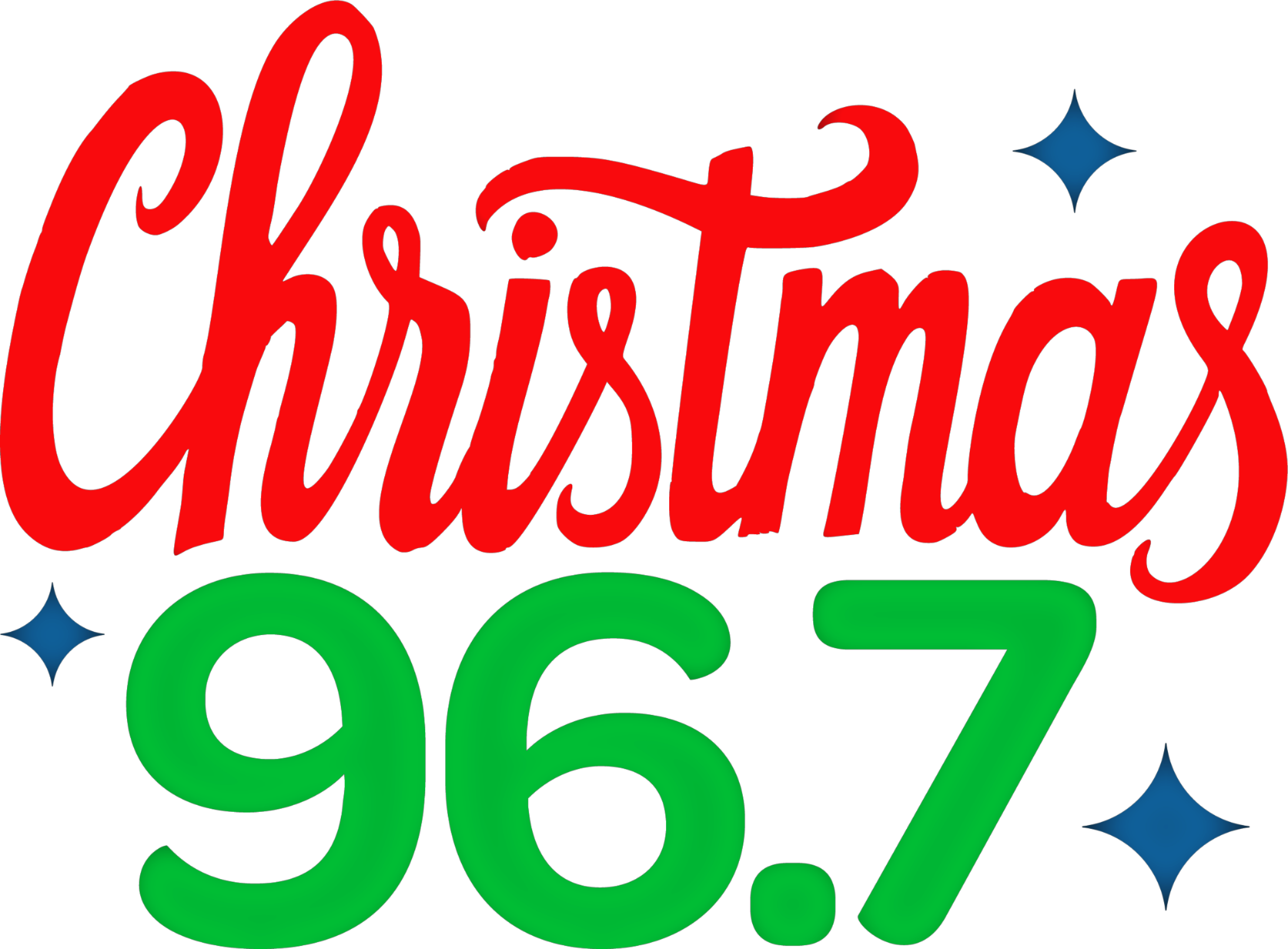
Logo as Christmas 96.7 (stunt)

On November 5, 2021, the station broke from the 105.7 simulcast once again and began stunting with Christmas music as "Christmas 96.7", running commercial free through the holiday season. On January 1, 2022, WBZW switched to a Regional Mexican format, branded as "96.7 El Patrón". The flip returned the format and branding to the iHeart cluster for the first time since the now-WRDG flipped to Spanish contemporary hits in November 2018.

== Previous logos ==
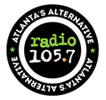
