= Instrument of authorization =

Concept in U.S. broadcast licensing

The United States Federal Communications Commission uses the term instrument of authorization with its broadcast licensees. It may refer to:

- Any license or permit issued
- Information relating to items on the station license
- Copies of the original documents

In most cases, licensees are required to post the instrument of authorization at the primary point of control. The public is permitted to see such authorizations and licensees are required to give the public access to those documents.
