= WUBL =

Country music radio station in Atlanta, Georgia, United States

Coordinates: 33.808°N 84.341°W

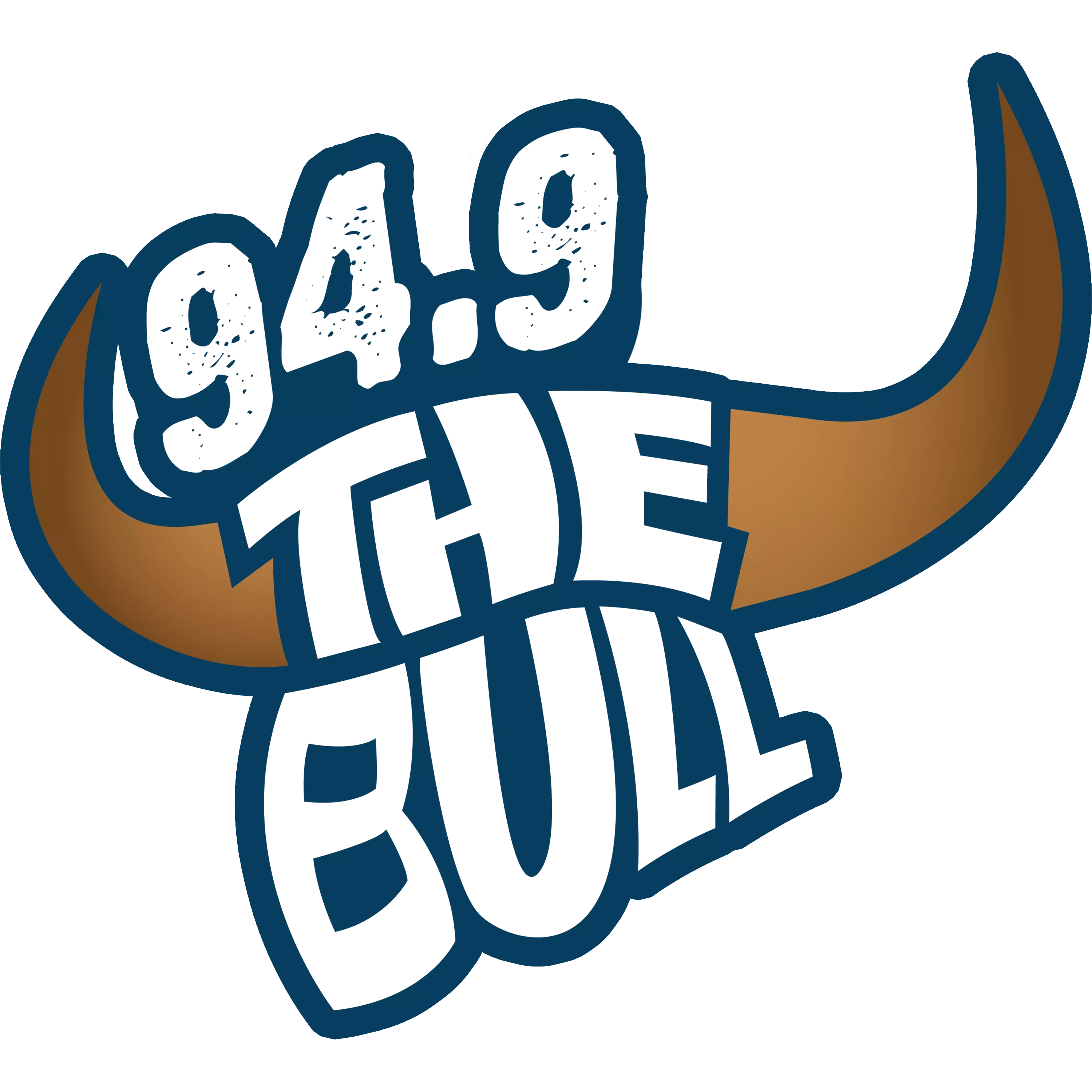
- Atlanta, Georgia; United States
- Broadcast area: Atlanta metropolitan area
- Frequency: 94.9 MHz (HD Radio)
- Branding: 94-9 The Bull

Programming
- Format: Country
- Subchannels: HD2: TikTok Radio
- Affiliations: Premiere Networks

Ownership
- Owner: iHeartMedia; (iHM Licenses, LLC)
- Sister stations: WBIN, WBZW, WBZY, WRDG, WWPW

History
- First air date: October 24, 1962
- Former call signs: WAVQ (1962–1965); WAVO-FM (1965–1972); WPCH (1972–2002); WLTM (2002–2006)
- Call sign meaning: Anagram of "bull"

Technical information
- Licensing authority: FCC
- Facility ID: 29735
- Class: C1
- ERP: 80,000 watts
- HAAT: 330 meters (1,080 ft)

Links
- Public license information: Public file; LMS
- Webcast: Listen Live
- Website: 949thebull.iheart.com

WUBL (94.9 FM) is a commercial radio station known as 94-9 The Bull. It is owned by iHeartMedia and it plays a country music radio format. The studios and offices are located at the Peachtree Palisades Building in the Brookwood Hills district of Atlanta. It has local DJs in the daytime and at nighttime it carries two syndicated Premiere Networks country music programs, The Bobby Bones Show and After MidNite With Granger Smith. The station's radio transmitter is located just northeast of Atlanta near Druid Hills Road in North Druid Hills, with several other stations.

Along with WSB AM and WSB-FM, this station is a primary entry point (PEP) for Emergency Alert System messages for the state of Georgia.

== History ==
=== Religious (1962–1972) ===
The station began on October 24, 1962, as religious WAVQ (changed to WAVO-FM in 1965), sister to WAVO (1420 AM). The station was signed on by the Great Commission Gospel Association, which was in the process of selling both outlets to Bob Jones University.

=== Easy listening/Soft rock (1972–2006) ===
In 1972, the format changed to easy listening with the WPCH callsign. In the early 1980s, the station's format switched from easy listening to soft AC as a response to WSB-FM's format change. The station was branded as "FM95 WPCH" until mid-1991, when the "Peach 94.9" name was adopted, reflecting its exact frequency for newer radios with digital tuning, and Atlanta's nickname as the "Big Peach". (This is derived from its main road of Peachtree Street, and New York being the "Big Apple", as well as Atlanta being the "New York of the South"; the callsign is now on WPCH-TV as "Peachtree TV" in Atlanta.) The format changed to soft adult contemporary in 1990. The easy listening format was revived online as "The Peach" by Pretty Cool Media in 2021. The station enjoyed consistent ratings success through the 1990s and early 2000s.

In December 2002, the name "Peach" was dropped, and the station rebranded as WLTM "94.9 Lite FM". Prior to Christmas each year, Lite FM played all Christmas music.

From 2005 to 2006, the station had Randy & Spiff as its morning show. After it was canceled, they moved their show to 640 WGST later in 2007. The duo were formerly at WFOX "Fox 97" (now WSRV "The River") and briefly at then sister Clear Channel station WLCL FM "Cool 105.7". Lite's morning show from May 2003 until March 2005 was married couple Gene and Julie Gates. The nighttime show was the syndicated Delilah. (However, Delilah was not on the new 96.7; instead it was aired on former competitor WSB-FM, "B98.5FM" from late December 2006 until 2011.)

=== Country (2006–present) ===
In the middle of its all-Christmas music format, and more than a week before Christmas Day, Lite FM changed to country music as "The Bull" at noon on December 18, 2006. WLTM's call letters were then changed to WUBL. The old adult contemporary format officially moved to 96.7 FM two days later, and stayed there until December 26, 2007, when 96.7 switched to a classic country format to accompany WUBL. On January 7, 2008, WUBL added The Cledus T. Party, starring comedian/parody singer Cledus T. Judd, as its morning show.

The station’s weekday lineup now features “The Bobby Bones Show” from 5-10am, Angie Ward from 10am-3pm, Corey Calhoun from 3-7pm, “Wayne and Tay” from 7pm-midnight, and “After Midnight with Granger Smith” overnight.

==== HD radio ====
In 2011, the station changed its HD Radio channel 2 to simulcast Immanuel Broadcasting Network, whose flagship station is WCCV FM 91.7 in Cartersville. Two IBN-owned broadcast translators are actually assigned to WUBL instead of WCCV as their primary station: W265AV 100.9 Woodstock, and W223BP 92.5 Lithia Springs (previously W221CG 92.1 "Kennesaw", which was actually near Hiram/Dallas), both transmitting IBN programming. WGST AM 640 was carried on WUBL's HD3 channel, as well as on W222AF FM 92.3, which is also owned by Immanuel and formerly rebroadcast WCCV. However, W222AF was assigned directly to retransmit WGST, not WUBL.

Former logo

In October 2012, not long after WGST became Spanish-language ESPN Deportes, WUBL HD-3 and W222AF split from WGST and became "Comedy 92-3", the locally inserted affiliate name for the satellite-fed radio network 24/7 Comedy. This same local feed was also retransmitted on DTV radio by WANN-CD 29, on virtual channel 32.21, with 94-9 the Bull on 32.22. In early June 2013, WUBL HD-3 and WANN 32.21 reverted to airing WGST at the same time that station again started English-language programming. ESPN Deportes moved to WWPW FM 96.1 HD-3, and now that station simulcasts on W222AF, although the FCC database still indicates WUBL as its supposed "primary" station. For a while in late 2014, WUBL HD-3 simulcasted the urban oldies and classic hip-hop formats of "Old School 99.3" (relayed on translator W257DF FM 99.3) through a lease agreement with owner Steve Hedgwood. After that translator was forced off-air due to co-channel interference with WCON-FM, the "Old School" format remained on the HD-3 channel for a time before returning to a simulcast of WGST. (The "Old School" format would be revived on WTBS-LP FM 87.7 in January 2016.)
