= WNSY =

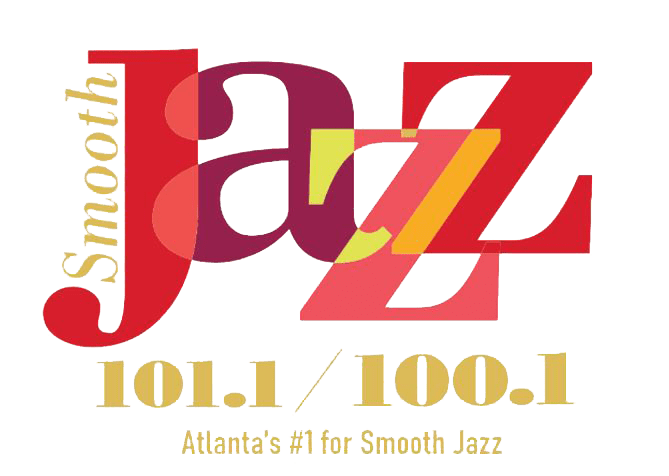
- Talking Rock, Georgia; United States
- Broadcast area: Atlanta metropolitan area
- Frequency: 100.1 MHz
- Branding: Smooth Jazz 101.1 and 100.1

Programming
- Format: Smooth jazz; (WJZA simulcast)
- Affiliations: Compass Media Networks

Ownership
- Owner: Davis Broadcasting of Atlanta, L.L.C.
- Sister stations: WCHK; WJZA; WLKQ-FM; WWWE

History
- First air date: 1998
- Former call signs: WCHK-FM (1998)
- Call sign meaning: "Sunny" (former branding)

Technical information
- Licensing authority: FCC
- Facility ID: 78332
- Class: C3
- ERP: 7,000 watts
- HAAT: 188 meters (617 ft)
- Transmitter coordinates: 34°37′50.3″N 84°29′28.7″W

Links
- Public license information: Public file; LMS
- Webcast: Listen live
- Website: www.smoothjazzatl.com

WNSY (100.1 FM) is a commercial radio station licensed to Talking Rock, Georgia, owned by Davis Broadcasting of Atlanta. The station simulcasts WJZA on 1100 kHz in Hapeville. The two stations, along with an Atlanta FM translator station at 101.1 MHz, simulcast a smooth jazz radio format. The stations use the dial position of the translator, using the moniker "101.1 WJZA."

WNSY's transmitter is near Jasper, Georgia, about 50 miles north of metro Atlanta.

== History ==
The station's construction permit was applied for from the Federal Communications Commission in 1995, and went on the air as WCHK-FM in 1998. The station at 100.1 became oldies "Sunny 100" in 1999.

In January 2007, Davis Broadcasting of Columbus, Georgia, completed the purchase of WNSY and WCHK. WNSY, Sunny 100 went off the air on the morning of January 22, 2007, and returned on February 1 with the simulcast of WLKQ, carrying a regional Mexican format.
