= WRDG =

Urban contemporary radio station in Atlanta, Georgia, United States

- Atlanta, Georgia; United States
- Broadcast area: Atlanta metropolitan area
- Frequency: 96.1 MHz (HD Radio)
- Branding: 96.1 The Beat

Programming
- Language: English
- Format: Urban contemporary
- Subchannels: HD2: WWPW simulcast; HD3: Adult contemporary "Peach"
- Affiliations: Premiere Networks

Ownership
- Owner: iHeartMedia; (iHM Licenses, LLC)
- Sister stations: WBIN; WBZW; WBZY; WUBL; WWPW

History
- First air date: December 2, 1960
- Former call signs: WGAA-FM (1960); WKLS (1961–1977); WKLS-FM (1977–1989); WEOA (1989); WKLS (1989–2012); WWPW (2012–2024)
- Call sign meaning: We’Re iheartRaDio 96.1 the beat atlanta, Georgia

Technical information
- Licensing authority: FCC
- Facility ID: 11275
- Class: C0
- ERP: 100,000 watts
- HAAT: 330 meters (1,080 ft)
- Transmitter coordinates: 33°48′27.00″N 84°20′26.00″W

Links
- Public license information: Public file; LMS
- Webcast: Listen live; HD2: Listen live; HD3: Listen live
- Website: 961thebeat.iheart.com; HD2: power1053.iheart.com/hd2/

WRDG (96.1 FM) – branded as 96.1 The Beat – is a commercial urban contemporary radio station licensed to Atlanta, Georgia. Owned by iHeartMedia, the station serves the Atlanta metropolitan area. The WRDG studios are located in Atlanta's Upper Westside district inside the Works ATL development, while the station transmitter resides in nearby North Druid Hills. Besides a standard analog transmission, WRDG broadcasts over three HD Radio channels, and is available online via iHeartRadio.

== History ==
=== Easy listening (1960–1972) ===
On December 2, 1960, the station signed on the air as WGAA-FM, the FM counterpart to WGAA in Cedartown. Shortly after being established, the station was sold to Kenco Broadcasting for $25,000. Kenco was headed by Don Kennedy, James Lathom and Arthur Swan; Kennedy was an Atlanta radio and television personality, playing "Officer Don" on WSB-TV's "Popeye Club" children's show from 1956 to 1972. After the sale, WGAA-FM's call letters were changed to WKLS, representing the initials of Kenco's partners, "Kennedy-Lathom-Swan". They sold it ten years later for $750,000.

From its earliest days until the early 1970s, the station played easy listening music. For its first several years on the air, WKLS was voice-tracked with most of the announcements and commercials read by Kennedy.

=== MOR (1972–1974) ===
By 1972, WKLS had moved to a middle of the road (MOR) format with popular adult music and live disc jockeys who served as friendly personalities. Its main slogan by then was "WKLS...That's 'Klass'".

From 1977 to 1988, WKLS was co-owned with WKLS (970 AM); consequently, WKLS was formally known as WKLS-FM during this period. The following year, the Federal Communications Commission (FCC) database shows it as having the call letters WEOA for a month from November to December (however, this may be a mistake).

=== Album rock (1974–2006) ===
WKLS made a dramatic change in 1974, as it flipped to an album rock format, using the moniker "96 Rock", the branding it retained until November 2006. Key artists on WKLS in the 1970s, included The Beatles, The Rolling Stones, Elton John, Carole King, The Who and Chicago. For a time in 1977, DJ "Skinny" Bobby Harper, who was the inspiration for Dr. Johnny Fever of the television sitcom WKRP in Cincinnati, was a WKLS disc jockey. In the 1980s, the station was acquired by The Great American Radio & TV Company, with Jacor Communications taking over in the 1990s.

In the early 1980s, "96 Rock" cultivated a somewhat macho image. The station often mocked competing stations which played Top 40 hits as "wimp rock". WKLS began to play more heavy metal, which was increasing in popularity, especially among teenaged boys. However, a backlash began to develop among the station's more mature listeners. In 1985, the station modified its playlist to a mix of older and newer titles. WKLS and its parent company Jacor was bought by San Antonio-based Clear Channel Communications.

"96 Rock" continued to play a mixture of classic rock and new rock for nearly two decades. WKLS finally became exclusively a classic rock station in 2004. The 2004 change occurred when competing Atlanta station Z-93 (WZGC FM 92.9) became "Dave FM", switching from classic rock to adult album alternative (AAA). This did not cause a dramatic change in 96 Rock's playlist, however. Even before officially declaring itself a classic rock station, most of its songs were from past decades. Only a few new or recent songs were played an hour.

The station honored its history and tradition on several occasions. In 1984, WKLS celebrated its 10th anniversary by airing a Labor Day countdown of the top 296 songs from 1974 to 1984. The station's 30th anniversary was recognized in 2004, with several promotions. Listeners were asked to write to the station and reminisce about events in their lives, in which 96 Rock played a memorable role. Some of this correspondence was read on the air and posted on the station's website.

In April 2004, long-time morning drive time hosts The Regular Guys (Larry Wachs and Eric Von Haessler) were fired after they had inadvertently aired graphic sexual language from porn star Devin Lane when the content bled through a Honda commercial. That content, which aired the previous month, was intended to be played backwards. The Regular Guys wanted to mock the FCC indecency crackdown when they came back from the break. Regular Guys sidekick "Southside" Steve Rickman and former midday host Tim Rhodes took the morning time slot temporarily. A permanent replacement came in the form of the syndicated Bob & Tom Show, as Rhodes and Rickman moved to the afternoon slot. The Regular Guys returned to Atlanta airwaves on March 21, 2005, and came back to 96 Rock in May, after a brief stint on co-owned talk radio station WGST. The return of the Regular Guys only lasted 18 months.

On October 23, 2006, Clear Channel Communications terminated the Regular Guys for good following an incident in which Wachs recorded bathroom conversations between the two morning show hosts on co-owned WWVA-FM while all three men were using the restroom. The recording was played on the air a couple of days later. The WWVA hosts (known as "Yogi & Panda") complained to management and subsequently sued Clear Channel and The Regular Guys. Wachs said, "A case of a humorous prank has turned into a culture clash, a suppression of First Amendment rights, and a ridiculous smear campaign against me as well as termination of my income without due process."

=== Active rock (2006–2012) ===
On November 17, at 9 am, Clear Channel dropped the station's 32-year "96 Rock" moniker, replacing it with "Project 9-6-1", and shifted to more of an active rock format. At the same time, alternative-formatted "105.3 The Buzz" (WBZY) ceased independent operations and began simulcasting the new format for several days, until a regional Mexican music format began. The new format on WKLS was intended to be somewhat of a merger between 96 Rock and The Buzz, although more personalities from The Buzz were on the new station than ones from 96 Rock.

On July 7, 2007, The Atlanta Journal-Constitution reported that the new morning show host for Project 9-6-1 would be "Giant" Brian Carothers, morning producer and sidekick for John DeBella at WMGK in Philadelphia. Carothers was joined by co-host Shaffee, former radio personality from long-time rock station WRIF in Detroit. The Giant Show debuted on October 1. On October 2, 2009, it was announced that "Giant" Brian Carothers would no longer be a part of the morning show and The Giant Show would be replaced by a show hosted by Shaffee and El Jefe, who was later replaced by Klinger.

On May 21, 2011, it was revealed that Shaffee and Klinger would no longer be a part of the morning show. Kidd Chris from WYSP Philadelphia announced on May 24, that he would be joining the morning show. He hosted mornings on Project 9-6-1 until the format's demise.

=== Top 40/CHR (2012–2024) ===
On August 29, 2012, at 7 pm, without warning, "Project" signed off following a farewell message from program director Chris "The OC" Williams, as he ended the station's 38-year rock history with "Free Bird" by Lynyrd Skynyrd, with the rock format moving to its HD2 digital subchannel. After stunting with an hour of jockless pop songs and the opening chorus to "Ready or Not" by The Fugees, the station flipped to contemporary hit radio, branded as "Power 96-1". The first (and ultimately, last) song on "Power" was "Party Rock Anthem" by LMFAO. The flip marked the second station in the market to use the "Power" branding, the first being WARM-FM/WAPW from 1986 to 1992. On September 11, WKLS changed call letters to WWPW to match the "Power" branding.

The nationally syndicated program Elvis Duran and the Morning Show was carried by WWPW from September 2012 until February 11, 2014. When Duran was discontinued, the station warned listeners about the change, and directed them to the iHeartRadio website and smartphone app. WWPW went a month without a morning show, playing music during morning drive time, calling it The Most New Hit Music in the Morning, until the station debuted a local morning show on March 17, with Scotty K, Riley Couture and Bret Mega.

On February 29, 2016, it was officially announced that Power Morning Show hosts Scotty K and Bret Mega were let go. This came as a surprise since the local morning show, and the station as a whole, had been gaining traction in the ratings. Some speculations had been made about Power mornings returning to a more music-intensive show. Word of their replacement was announced on March 19, with PK Kalentzis, formerly of The Playhouse morning show from Portland, Oregon, and KKHH in Houston, hosting mornings along with his wife Denise and Riley Couture beginning March 21. In November 2020, PK and Denise Kalentzis and co-host DuRyan Smith were let go as a result of budget cuts; in February 2021, WWPW would pick up "The Jubal Show" (syndicated from sister station KBKS in Seattle) for morning drive.

WWPW also carried the syndicated On-Air with Ryan Seacrest, hosted by Atlanta native Ryan Seacrest, in middays. Seacrest's countdown show American Top 40 was also heard Sunday mornings.

=== Urban Contemporary (2024–present) ===
On April 16, 2024, WWPW began promoting a "big announcement" at noon that day. At that time, WWPW assumed WRDG's urban contemporary format and "Beat" branding, relaunching as "96.1 The Beat". After a one hour simulcast, the Top 40/CHR format and "Power" branding would move to WRDG. The move comes as "Power" registered a 1.8 share in the March 2024 Nielsen ratings, well behind WWWQ's 3 share. The two stations would swap call letters on April 23.

== Digital broadcasting ==
WRDG broadcasts in IBOC digital radio, using the HD Radio system, with four subchannels:

- WRDG-HD1 is a digital simulcast of the analog signal.
- WRDG-HD2 WRDG-HD2 airs a simulcast of (105.3 FM, "Power 105-3") an Atlanta radio station broadcasting a Contemporary hit radio radio format and was previously on the 96.1 FM frequency, until 2024 when it was moved down the dial to 105.3 FM.
- WRDG-HD3 airs the "Peach" format playing 80s & 90s music.

In late March 2010, low-power digital TV station WANN-LD started carrying the audio of WKLS on one of its multiplexed, audio-only digital subchannels. Originally on virtual channel 32.13, it was then moved to 32.103, with 32.101 to 32.106 reserved for other iHeartMedia stations in Atlanta.

=== HD2 ===
On January 30, 2006, WKLS added a separate digital subchannel known under the branding "The Cabin" and airing an adult album alternative format. WKLS-HD2 later changed names to "The Alternative Project" or "Project 9-6-1".

Following the main channel's format change to "Power 96.1" in August 2012, the "Project 9-6-1" rock format moved to the HD2 subchannel of WKLS as "Project 9-6-2". Then on March 28, 2013, hours after the WWVA/WWLG simulcast flipped formats from rhythmic contemporary, WWPW-HD2 became "Wild 96.1 HD2".

It eventually changed to a simulcast of sister station WRDG due to low signal strength in the eastern portions of Atlanta. This was later replaced with a rock format under the heritage "96 Rock" branding that was heard on the analog channel prior to 2006.

=== HD3 ===
In June 2013, WWPW activated a third digital subchannel, WWPW-HD3, and began airing ESPN Deportes Spanish-language sports programming. The format was also carried on FM translator W222AF at 92.3 MHz. On October 2, 2015, W222AF/WWPW-HD3 flipped to Spanish adult contemporary with the branding "Mia 92.3".

In July 2020, WWPW-HD3 switched to a simulcast of sister station WBIN. As of November 2022, the sub-channel was turned off.

As of late 2024, HD3 currently broadcasts the iHeart adult contemporary "Peach" format, playing 80 & 90s music.

=== HD4 ===
On September 24, 2020, the WWPW-HD4 subchannel changed formats from gospel to classic hits, still under the "102.1 The King" branding. On January 8, 2021, WWPW-HD4 rebranded as "Fox FM", joining simulcasters WBAF (1090 AM) in Barnesville and WFDR (1370 AM) in Manchester. Syndicated programming on Fox FM includes Daily Dees hosted by Rick Dees in middays and Scott Shannon Presents America's Greatest Hits on weekends.

As of August 2022, "Fox FM" is no longer broadcast on WWPW-HD4.

== Previous logo ==
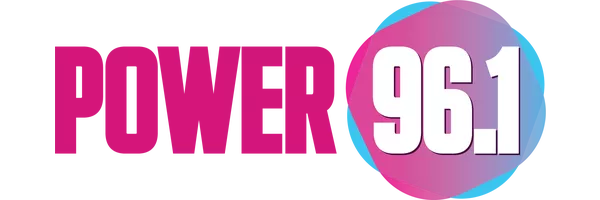
