= WBZY =

Spanish-language contemporary hit radio station in Atlanta, Georgia, United States

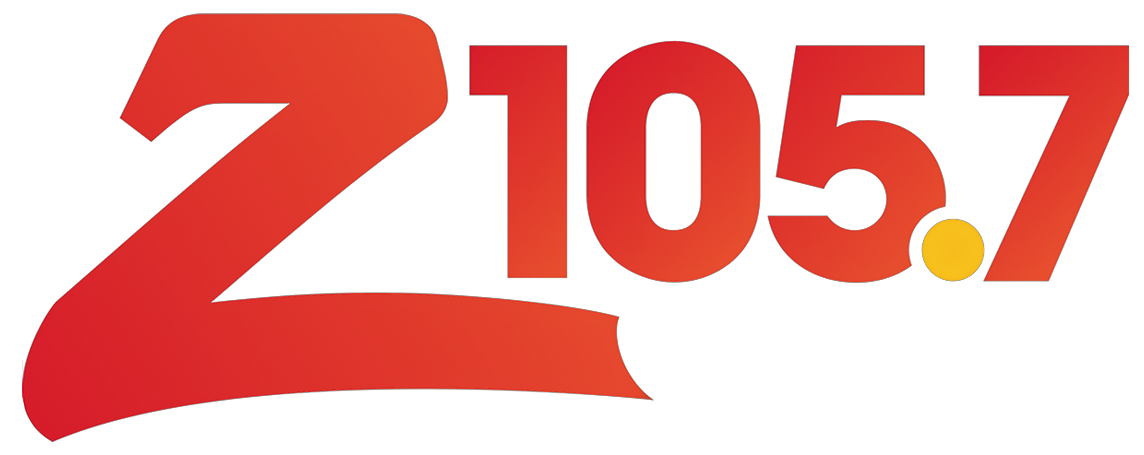
- Canton, Georgia; United States
- Broadcast area: Atlanta metropolitan area
- Frequency: 105.7 MHz (HD Radio)
- Branding: Z105.7

Programming
- Language: Spanish
- Format: Contemporary hit radio
- Subchannels: HD2: Regional Mexican (WBZW simulcast); HD3: Dance radio (Pride Radio)
- Affiliations: Premiere Networks

Ownership
- Owner: iHeartMedia; (iHM Licenses, LLC)
- Sister stations: WBIN; WBZW; WRDG; WUBL; WWPW

History
- First air date: August 1, 1964; 62 years ago
- Former call signs: WCHK-FM (1964–1993); WGST-FM (1993–2000); WMXV (2000–2003); WLCL (2003–2005); WWVA-FM (2005–2013); WRDA (2013–2020)
- Former frequencies: 105.5 MHz (1964–1993)
- Call sign meaning: "Buzz" (moved over from now-WRDG, which formerly used this branding)

Technical information
- Licensing authority: FCC
- Facility ID: 10698
- Class: C2
- ERP: 20,000 watts
- HAAT: 238 meters (781 ft)
- Transmitter coordinates: 34°03′58.00″N 84°27′15.00″W

Links
- Public license information: Public file; LMS
- Webcast: Listen live (via iHeartRadio)
- Website: z1057atlanta.iheart.com

WBZY (105.7 MHz) branded Z105.7 is a commercial FM radio station licensed to Canton, Georgia, It broadcasting a Spanish-language contemporary hit radio format. Owned by iHeartMedia, WBZY serves the Atlanta metropolitan area. The WBZY studios are located in Atlanta, while the station transmitter resides in the nearby suburb of Marietta. Besides a standard analog transmission, WBZY broadcasts over two HD Radio channels, and is available online via iHeartRadio. WBZY formerly repeated over the 32.25 digital subchannel of Atlanta television station WANN-CD (29 UHF, 32 PSIP) and previously did so on a number of occasions with sister station WBZW, the most recent lasting until November 5, 2021.

The station is also broadcast in HD radio.

== History ==
=== Country (1964–1993) ===
From its sign-on in 1964 until 1991, the station was country music WCHK-FM on 105.5 MHz in Canton, Georgia, sister station to WCHK AM. In 1993, owner Cherokee Broadcasting received FCC approval to upgrade to class C2, with a much stronger signal and relocation of their transmitter site from the WTLK-TV 14 (now WPXA-TV) tower on Bear Mountain (near Lake Arrowhead southwest of Waleska) south-southeastward toward Atlanta. (This large broadcast tower in Holly Springs is next to Interstate 575 and old Georgia 5 at Rabbit Hill Road, and now only has mobile phone base stations about halfway up on it). This change also required a frequency shift of one channel to 105.7. Subsequently, this also allowed a later move by WMAX-FM (now sister station WRDG) on 105.3 from Carrollton east towards Atlanta, also having changed channels from 105.5. WCHK remained under local management for a little over a year afterward, briefly as "North Metro's K-105" then as "Country 105.7", and finally as "Atlanta's Classic Country 105.7", before owner Chuck McClure leased the station to iHeartMedia (which also owns 105.3), then known as Clear Channel Communications.

=== News/talk (1993–2000) ===
Under Clear Channel management, the station became WGST-FM and simulcast news/talk WGST, beginning October 1. In the mid-1990s, it again relocated its transmitter site southward, this time to the Sweat Mountain antenna farm in northeastern Cobb County (where several other stations are). In 2004, Clear Channel purchased the station and license outright from McClure, and still holds Canton as its city of license. A new WCHK-FM, located at 100.1 and also owned by McClure, was sold and changed to WNSY FM (oldies "Sunny 100") in 1999, later becoming the market's third hispanic FM station, but covering more toward northwest Georgia.

=== Adult contemporary (2000–2002) ===
On September 8, 2000, 105.7 broke away from the WGST simulcast, and became rock AC/classic rock "Mix 105.7" (WMXV), but did not stay that way for long due to lagging Arbitron ratings, despite adding a simulcast on 96.7 FM for the South Metro in October 2001 (which was dropped in April 2002).

=== Oldies (2002–2005) ===
On February 3, 2003, at 5 pm, WMXV began stunting with all-Beatles music. At 12:10 pm on February 7, WMXV became WLCL "Cool 105.7" (the first song on "Cool" was "You Keep Me Hanging On" by The Supremes), playing 1960s and 1970s oldies music after Cox Radio dropped its 1950s and 1960s, "Fox 97" format from WFOX, which is now WSRV. At the time, WLCL was the only oldies station in Atlanta; however, the format was not as profitable to companies as it was in Fox 97's prime.

=== Spanish music (2005–2009) ===
On May 2, 2005, the oldies format was ended, and WWVA moved its "Viva" format to the 105.7 frequency. During the flip, "Viva" warned listeners on the old 105.3 frequency to make the change to 105.7 that was played on a format loop. One week later, the station officially became WWVA-FM itself, swapping the WLCL callsign over to 105.3, where "The Buzz" format from 96.7 was put. Strangely, that left the hard modern rock of "The Buzz" with the WLCL call letters instead of its own WBZY-FM, which was unused for about two weeks. ("The Buzz" later merged into "96 Rock", becoming "Project 9-6-1", but remaining as WKLS).

"Viva 105.7" began simulcasting on 96.7 FM (formerly "The Buzz") on May 17, and that station's callsign was changed to WVWA (an anagram of WWVA, with the two middle letters transposed). Because 105.7 is north of Atlanta, 96.7 gave some coverage to the south. Its far-northeastern simulcast on WHEL (105.1 FM) in Helen, Georgia was sold in 2005, and has since changed formats to hot AC. On December 20, 2006, WVWA flipped formats to 94.9's former adult contemporary format as "96.7 Lite FM" and took its WLTM callsign as well. (This station would flip about a year later to country music WWLG FM 96.7 "The Legend", and later returned to simulcast this station).

=== Rhythmic (2009–2012) ===
On October 19, 2009, at 10 am, the station dropped the Spanish format and again began simulcasting WGST AM 640, leading to speculation that it would return to its former news/talk format. At the same time, its website displayed a large question mark. However, the station would shift to a stunt featuring the possible return of AC station "The Peach", which was formerly heard on 94.9 FM, and some Christmas music as "Holiday 105.7". At 4 pm the same day, the format wheel would officially land on rhythmic AC as "Groove 105.7". (The "Viva" format now airs on the HD2 channel of sister station 105.3 "El Patron"). The new station featured a mix of current and gold-based rhythmic hits targeting ages 25 to 54. Its primary competitors were a variety of Atlanta stations because of its unique approach: AC WSB-FM, rhythmic WSBB-FM, top-40 WWWQ and WSTR, urbans WVEE and WHTA, and urban ACs WALR-FM and WUMJ. For its kick-off, WWVA's first songs were "Into the Groove" by Madonna, "Shake Your Groove Thing" by Peaches & Herb, "Groove Is In The Heart" by Deee-Lite and "Let's Groove" by Earth, Wind & Fire. Clear Channel, in turn, merged WWVA's format into WBZY's, giving Atlanta a hybrid regional Mexican and Spanish AC outlet at the latter. On January 11, 2010, the nationally syndicated morning drive-time Elvis Duran and the Morning Show premiered on the station. Duran previously did evenings in Atlanta with sidekick "Hot Henrietta" at Z-93 during the late 1980s.

The station briefly aired "Streetz 102.9" on its HD-2 channel, in order to satisfy a legal fiction so that it could be broadcast on W275BK FM 102.9. A lawsuit regarding the owners of that broadcast translator quickly ensued, and W275BK is now assigned to WAMJ. Since the end of March, the station is now also simulcast on WANN-CD, a low-power digital TV station on physical (RF) TV channel 29 in Atlanta. The main channel was heard on virtual channel 32.106, with Pride Radio (WWVA's HD2 digital subchannel) formerly on 32.105. Clear Channel's other Atlanta stations are also heard via DTV radio on WANN.

In May, WWVA's music and playlist direction shifted to rhythmic Top 40 by adding more current rhythmic pop/R&B/dance tracks. They also added a few mainstream pop songs, but later dropped them from the playlist. It also phased out the heavy amount of rhythmic gold product. This move was expected to benefit WWVA (as evidenced on their Facebook page at their website) as it stood to pick up listeners and carry the rhythmic Top 40 mantle from WBTS, who exited the rhythmic format after 11 years to become a simulcast of WSB on August 16. Despite the sudden shift to rhythmic Top 40 and primary signal coverage into Atlanta, there was some criticism over whether WWVA could actually replace WBTS, or fill the void for that matter, in terms of music, personalities, area promotion, and signal presence.

In efforts to fill in a signal shortcoming in southern portions of the market, the station re-added WWLG FM 96.7 as a simulcast on September 6. It also changed its positioner to "Atlanta's Party Station", which was last used at WWLG's predecessor WLDA when it was "Wild 96.7". Another move came from the hiring of former WBTS and WHTA DJ-mixer Mami Chula to The Groove's lineup. On November 14, the station changed its name to "WiLD 105.7 & 96.7", retaining the "Atlanta's Party Station" slogan. (The first song on "WiLD" was "We R Who We R" by Ke$ha). WWVA saw an increase in terms of listeners and ratings, mostly among the 18-34 audience and managed to carve its own niche by playing dance-pop and rhythmic tracks that their competitors usually avoid.

=== Alternative rock (2012–2020) ===
On August 29, 2012, sister station WKLS FM ("Project 9-6-1") (now WWPW) flipped from its long-time rock format to Top 40, branded as "Power 96-1". Because WiLD was under the same ownership of Power, and with nearly identical formats, it was likely the two formats would merge, with 105.7/96.7 flipping to a new format after Labor Day. A change was also likely due to the station's program director being released days before the change, but on August 30, it was announced that WWVA would retain their rhythmic format, but tweaked its direction towards more hip-hop tracks and less emphasis on dance under its new PD (Rick Vaughn) for both WWVA and WWPW.

However, by March 2013, due to the launch of Power, the move of Elvis Duran and the Morning Show to WWPW, and a lack of promotion, ratings had tumbled from a mid-3 share to a 1.8 share, among the lowest-rated commercial music radio stations in the area. Therefore, on March 28, at 11 am, with little warning, after playing "Rosa Parks" by Atlanta hip hop group OutKast, WWVA/WWLG went into a stunt loop consisting of R.E.M.'s "What's the Frequency, Kenneth?" and "Radio Song". One hour later, WWVA/WWLG launched an alternative rock format, branded as "Radio 105.7", with the first song being "It's the End of the World as We Know It (And I Feel Fine)" by R.E.M. (from nearby Athens, Georgia). This filled the hole left by 99X when it flipped to active rock in September 2012 and adult album alternative WZGC ("92.9 Dave FM") flipping to sports talk the following month.

The two stations' broadcast callsigns were changed to WRDA and WRDG, respectively, on April 11, and the "Wild" format moved to WWPW FM 96.1 HD2, replacing the "Project 9-6-1" format that was eliminated from analog and HD1 by Wild's near-clone "Power 96-1".

On November 11, 2016, WRDG dropped its simulcast of WRDA and flipped to urban; however, WRDA retained the alternative format. On December 5, 2017, WRDA rebranded as "Alt 105-7", to align itself with other iHeartMedia-owned alternative outlets.

=== Spanish music (2020–present) ===
On April 20, 2020, at midnight, after playing "Novocaine" by The Unlikely Candidates, WRDA flipped back to a Spanish-language CHR format as "Z105.7" (the first song played was "Fantasía" by Ozuna), initially as a simulcast of WBZY (105.3 FM), where the format has been heard since October 2018. WBZY serves areas to the south and west of Atlanta, while WRDA covers the more populous northern and eastern portions of the market, as well as where the majority of the market's Hispanic and Latino population resides. The simulcast would last until May 4, when WBZY adopted WRDG's urban format. Both WBZY and WRDA had a 0.9 rating in the March 2020 Nielsen Audio ratings, which had just been released days prior to the flip. The WBZY call letters would move to 105.7 FM on May 11; in turn, the WRDA calls moved to 105.3 FM. On May 18, WBZY began simulcasting on WBZW (96.7 FM) once again, but would then drop the simulcast again on November 5, 2021.

== HD radio and other outlets ==
WBZY's digital subchannel offers one different format:

- HD2: WBZY-HD2 is a Regional Mexican simulcast of sister station WBZW, which is used to cover the areas WBZW cannot reach.
- HD3: WBZY-HD3 airs Pride Radio, which plays dance music targeted towards the LGBT community

WBZY's main channel was also heard on DTV radio via digital low-power TV station WANN-CD 29, on virtual channel 32.23, with the former WiLD format on 32.25.

== Previous logos ==
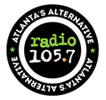
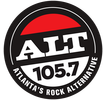
