= WWPW =

Contemporary hit radio station in Bowdon–Atlanta, Georgia, United States

Coordinates: 33.412°N 84.830°W

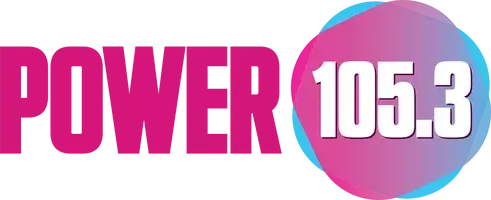
- Bowdon, Georgia; United States
- Broadcast area: Atlanta metropolitan area; Midwest Georgia
- Frequency: 105.3 MHz (HD Radio)
- Branding: Power 105.3 & 96.1 HD2

Programming
- Language: English
- Format: Contemporary hit radio
- Affiliations: Premiere Networks

Ownership
- Owner: iHeartMedia; (iHM Licenses, LLC)
- Sister stations: WBIN; WBZW; WBZY; WUBL; WRDG

History
- First air date: May 1994; 32 years ago
- Former call signs: WYAI (1994–2002); WMAX-FM (2002–2004); WWVA-FM (2004–2005); WLCL (2005); WBZY (2005–2020); WRDA (2020); WRDG (2020–2024)
- Former frequencies: 105.5 MHz (1994–2002)
- Call sign meaning: Power

Technical information
- Licensing authority: FCC
- Facility ID: 63406
- Class: C1
- ERP: 61,000 watts
- HAAT: 367 meters (1,204 ft)
- Repeater: 96.1 WRDG-HD2 (Atlanta)

Links
- Public license information: Public file; LMS
- Webcast: Listen live (via iHeartRadio)
- Website: power1053.iheart.com

WWPW (105.3 FM, "Power 105-3") is an Atlanta contemporary hit radio station. The station's transmitter is located in Newnan, Georgia and targets metro Atlanta, also covering its city of license of Bowdon, Georgia. It is owned by iHeartMedia and operates from studios located in Atlanta's Upper Westside district inside the Works ATL development. It addition to its main signal it is also simulcast on the HD2 subchannel of WRDG.

== History ==
=== Country (1994–2002) ===
The station began in May 1994 as country music "Y 105.5" WYAI-FM, a class-A serving Carrollton to the west-southwest of metro Atlanta. Having co-channel RF interference with station WCHK-FM 105.5 in Canton, Georgia (north-northwest of Atlanta), both stations changed radio frequencies (the other station now being WBZY 105.7) and moved closer to Atlanta.

=== 1980s hits (2002–2004) ===
In late February 2002, the station upgraded to a class C1 as an Atlanta move-in. To create hype, the station stunted with classical music and comedy bits. 105.3 officially debuted as WMAX-FM "105-3 The Max", playing all 1980s music, on February 18, 2002, with "Video Killed the Radio Star" by The Buggles being the first song played.

=== Hot talk (2004) ===
On January 30, 2004, at 6 pm, after playing "It's The End of the World" by R.E.M., WMAX-FM became a hot talk station known as "Real Radio 105.3" that aired talk on weekdays; 1980s music would remain on weekends. The WMAX-FM callsign now resides on another iHeartMedia station in Holland, Michigan, which is currently branded as “96.1 The Game.”

=== Spanish music (2004–2005) ===
On September 15, 2004, at 10 a.m., following "The MJ Morning Show", the station began stunting with a heartbeat sound effect and Spanish-language liners promoting the upcoming launch of a new format. At 11 pm that evening, the station changed to Latin Top 40 as WWVA-FM "Viva 105.3", as part of efforts by owner iHeartMedia (then Clear Channel Communications) to expand into Hispanic radio markets. During the last quarter of 2004, it was the second-top-rated radio station in Atlanta.

=== Alternative rock (2005–2006) ===
On May 5, 2005, WWVA-FM would begin simulcasting on 105.7 FM, displacing oldies-formatted "Cool 105.7", as part of a frequency and format shuffle. After four days of simulcasting and a brief stunt of a loop directing listeners to the new frequency, WBZY's alternative rock format would move from 96.7 to 105.3 as "105.3 the Buzz" ("Viva" would then also begin simulcasting on 96.7 FM on May 17, also after a brief simulcasting period). For two weeks, the calls of 105.3 were changed to WLCL, so the local media would not be able to predict the move. After the switch, the calls were changed to WBZY.

=== Spanish music (2006–2020) ===
On November 17, 2006, at 9 am, WBZY dropped the alternative format and "Buzz" branding. Some of the on-air staff were fired and others moved down the dial to sister station WKLS FM 96.1, which relaunched from "96 Rock" to "Project 9-6-1". For several days, WBZY simulcast WKLS until it began a loop telling listeners to tune into the new station, as well as advertising the new format of the station. The 105.3 frequency debuted a new Regional Mexican format under the name El Patrón at 9 a.m. on November 28.

On October 19, 2009, sister station WWVA-FM (then known as Viva 105.7), who had been broadcasting a Spanish AC format, flipped to rhythmic AC as "Groove 105.7", thus leaving WBZY as Atlanta's only FM Spanish-language station. This move prompted Clear Channel to merge 105.7's Spanish adult contemporary format with 105.3's regional Mexican format. The "Viva" format has moved to El Patrón's HD-2 channel.

At 5 pm on November 8, 2018, WBZY flipped to Spanish CHR, branded as "Z105.3". In July of the following year, the branding changed slightly to "105.3 La Z", though it would revert to the "Z105.3" branding the next year.

=== Urban (2020–2024) ===
On April 20, 2020, sister station WRDA assumed the format of WBZY, with both frequencies simulcasting as a means of transition for the "Z" format. At midnight on May 4, 2020, in the middle of "Limbo" by Daddy Yankee, WBZY dropped the simulcast and assumed the mainstream urban format of WRDG as "105.3 The Beat" (the first song on "The Beat" was "High Fashion" by one-time Atlanta native Roddy Ricch), as the 105.3 frequency had a much larger signal coverage (at 61,000 watts), albeit covering the Atlanta Metropolitan area from the southwestern portion of the market (roughly 80% of Fulton and DeKalb counties, a majority encompasses the city of Atlanta based on its primary signal coverage). Like the WRDA simulcast, this was a temporary simulcast; on May 18, WRDG switched to a simulcast of WBZY as WBZW. The WBZY call letters would move to 105.7 FM on May 11; in turn, the WRDA calls moved to 105.3 FM. A week later, 105.3 would adopt the WRDG call letters from 96.7.

=== Contemporary hit radio (2024–present) ===
On April 16, 2024, WRDG began promoting a "big announcement" to take place at noon that day. At that time, after playing "On Me" by Lil' Baby, WRDG's urban format and "Beat" branding moved to sister station WWPW as "96.1 The Beat". After an hour of simulcasting, WRDG assumed WWPW's contemporary hit radio format and "Power" branding as "Power 105.3." The first song after the move was "Lovin' On Me" by Jack Harlow. The two stations would swap call letters on April 23.

== See also ==
- List of radio stations in Georgia (U.S. state)
- Georgia (U.S. state)
- List of radio stations in North and Central America
