= Mass media in Atlanta =

The following is a list of mass media in Atlanta, Georgia, United States.

== Print ==
=== Daily ===
- The Atlanta Journal-Constitution
- Atlanta Daily World

=== Weekly ===
- Atlanta Business Chronicle
- Atlanta Inquirer
- The Atlanta Jewish Times
- Atlanta Voice
- The Emory Wheel
- Fulton Neighbor
- The Signal
- The Technique

=== Monthly ===
- Atlanta Intown, a Rough Draft Publication
- Barbershop Digest
- The Southerner

=== Suburban ===
- Acción Deportes
- Gwinnett Daily Post
- Marietta Daily Journal
- El Nuevo Georgia

=== Defunct ===
- Atlanta Constitution
- Atlanta Georgian
- Atlanta Journal
- Atlanta Southern Confederacy
- Daily Examiner
- Daily Intelligencer
- Daily Report Online
- The Great Speckled Bird
- Southern Voice
- The Sunny South
- Artsatl
- Creative Loafing

=== Magazines ===
- Art Papers
- Atlanta
- Atlanta History
- Atlanta Review
- Azizah Magazine
- Barbershop Digest
- David Atlanta
- FENUXE
- Jezebel
- Wussy Magazine
- Burnaway

== Broadcast radio ==
The Atlanta metropolitan area is currently the ninth-largest radio market in the United States as ranked by Nielsen Media Research. The following list includes full-power stations licensed to Atlanta proper, in addition to area suburbs.

Currently, radio stations that primarily serve the Atlanta metropolitan area include:

=== AM stations ===
- 590 WDWD Atlanta (Christian)
- 610 WPLO Grayson (Regional Mexican)
- 640 WBIN Atlanta (Black Information Network)
- 680 WCNN Atlanta (Sports)
- 750 WSB Atlanta (News/talk)
- 790 WQXI Atlanta (Korean)
- 860 WAEC Atlanta (Christian)
- 920 WGKA Atlanta (Conservative talk)
- 970 WNIV Atlanta (Christian)
- 1010 WXKG Atlanta (South Asian)
- 1100 WJZA Hapeville (Brokered)
- 1160 WCFO East Point (Catholic/EWTN)
- 1190 WAFS Atlanta (Relevant Radio)
- 1230 WFOM Marietta (Conservative talk)
- 1310 WWWE Decatur (Smooth jazz)
- 1340 WIFN Atlanta (Sports)
- 1380 WAOK Atlanta (Urban talk)
- 1400 WLTA Alpharetta (Christian)
- 1400 WRZX Newnan (Sports)
- 1410 WKKP McDonough (Classic country)
- 1420 WWSZ Decatur (Urban contemporary)
- 1430 WYKG Covington (Gospel)
- 1450 WBHF Cartersville (Adult standards/talk/sports)
- 1460 WXEM Buford (Regional Mexican)
- 1480 WYZE Atlanta (Gospel)
- 1500 WDPC Dallas (Christian)
- 1520 WDCY Douglasville (Christian)
- 1550 WAZX Smyrna (Oldies)
- 1570 WIGO Morrow (Gospel)
- 1600 WAOS Austell (Regional Mexican)
- 1690 WMLB Avondale Estates (Conservative talk)

=== FM stations ===
- 88.5 WRAS Atlanta (College/NPR/GPB)
- 89.1 WBCX Gainesville (College/variety)
- 89.3 WRFG Atlanta (College/freeform)
- 90.1 WABE Atlanta (NPR/classical)
- 90.5 WUWG Carrollton (NPR/GPB)
- 90.7 WUOG Athens (College/freeform)
- 91.1 WREK Atlanta (College/freeform)
- 91.5 WWEV-FM Cumming (Christian)
- 91.7 WUGA Athens (NPR/GPB)
- 91.7 WCCV Cartersville (Christian)
- 91.9 WCLK Atlanta (NPR/jazz)
- 92.9 WZGC Atlanta (Sports)
- 93.3 WVFJ-FM Greenville (Contemporary Christian)
- 94.1 WSTR Smyrna (Rhythmic AC)
- 94.9 WUBL Atlanta (Country)
- 95.5 WSBB-FM Doraville (Talk)
- 96.1 WRDG Atlanta (Urban contemporary)
- 96.7 WBZW Union City (Spanish contemporary)
- 97.1 WSRV Gainesville (Classic hits)
- 97.5 WUMJ Fayetteville (Urban AC)
- 98.5 WSB-FM Atlanta (Adult contemporary)
- 99.3 WCON-FM Cornelia (Classic country)
- 99.7 WWWQ Atlanta (Contemporary hit radio)
- 100.1 WNSY Talking Rock (Regional Mexican)
- 100.5 WNNX College Park (Classic alternative)
- 101.5 WKHX-FM Marietta (Country)
- 102.3 WLKQ-FM Buford (Regional Mexican)
- 102.5 WPZE Mableton (Gospel)
- 103.3 WVEE Atlanta (Urban contemporary)
- 104.1 WALR-FM Palmetto (Urban AC)
- 104.7 WAIA Athens (Air1)
- 105.3 WWPW Bowdon (Top 40 (CHR))
- 105.7 WBZY Canton (Spanish contemporary)
- 106.7 WAKL Gainesville (K-Love)
- 107.1 WTSH-FM Rockmart (Regional Mexican)
- 107.5 WAMJ Roswell (Urban AC)
- 107.9 WHTA Hampton (Mainstream urban)

=== Low-power FM stations and translators ===
- 89.7 W209CD Atlanta (Christian)
- 92.3 W222AF Marietta (K-LOVE)
- 93.3 W227DN Norcross (South Asian/WTZA simulcast)
- 93.5 W228CA Suwanee (Classic alternative/WSRV-HD2 simulcast)
- 93.7 W229AG Atlanta (Sports/WCNN simulcast)
- 94.5 W233BF Atlanta (Urban contemporary/WWSZ simulcast)
- 96.7 W244EI Atlanta (Korean/WQXI simulcast)
- 97.7 W249CK Duluth (Classic alternative/WSRV-HD2 simulcast)
- 99.1 WIEH-LP Marietta (Brazilian Portuguese Christian)
- 101.9 WATB-LP Atlanta (Community)
- 102.9 W275BK Decatur (Urban oldies/WAMJ-HD2 simulcast)
- 103.7 W279CZ Atlanta (Sports/ESPN/WIFN simulcast)
- 103.7 WPCG-LP Canton (Christian)
- 103.7 WRUX-LP Atlanta (Christian)
- 106.3 W292EV Marietta (Conservative talk/WFOM simulcast)
- 106.3 WHLE-LP Atlanta (Black gospel)

=== Defunct ===
- WGHR/Marietta (1981–2004)
- WGM/Atlanta (1922–1923)
- WHIE/Griffin (1954–2020)
- WMLB/Cumming (1961–2003)
- WSB-FM (104.5)/Atlanta (1948–1952)
- WTJH/East Point (1950–2010)

== Television ==
The Atlanta metropolitan area is currently defined by Nielsen Media Research as the seventh-largest television market in the United States, with all of the major U.S. television networks having affiliates serving the region.

Atlanta is a major cable television programming center. Ted Turner began the Turner Broadcasting System in Atlanta in 1970 with his takeover of WJRJ-TV, renamed WTCG in 1970 and WTBS in 1979; WTBS became a pioneer "superstation" distributed to cable operators internationally, eventually yielding TBS. Ted established CNN in 1980, long headquartered at the CNN Center. Most of Turner's other networks—including Cartoon Network/Adult Swim, Boomerang, TNT, Turner Sports, Turner Classic Movies, HLN and CNN International—continue to be based in Atlanta. The Weather Channel has its offices and studios in nearby Cumberland. The first nationwide music video programming on cable television, Video Concert Hall, was created in Atlanta.

Currently, television stations that primarily serve the Atlanta metropolitan area include:

=== Full-power ===
- 2 WSB-TV Atlanta (ABC)
- 5 WAGA-TV Atlanta (Fox)
- 8 WGTV Athens (PBS/GPB)
- 11 WXIA-TV Atlanta (NBC)
- 14 WPXA-TV Rome (Ion Television)
- 17 WPCH-TV Atlanta (The CW)
- 30 WABE-TV Atlanta (PBS)
- 34 WUVG-DT Athens (Univision)
- 36 WATL Atlanta (MyNetworkTV)
- 46 WANF Atlanta (Independent)
- 57 WATC-DT Atlanta (Religious independent)
- 63 WHSG-TV Monroe (TBN)
- 69 WUPA Atlanta (CBS)

=== Low-power ===
- 4 WUVM-LD Atlanta (Estrella TV)
- 6 WTBS-LD Atlanta (Estrella TV)
- 16 WYGA-CD Atlanta (BeIN Sports)
- 22 WSKC-CD Atlanta (KBS World)
- 28 WDWW-LD Cleveland (CBN News)
- 29 WANN-CD Atlanta (Independent)
- 35 WDTA-LD Atlanta (Daystar)
- 40 WIRE-CD Atlanta (Infomercials)
- 42 WTHC-LD Atlanta (Tourism info)
- 45 W13DQ-D Atlanta (HSN)
- 47 WKTB-CD Norcross (Telemundo)

=== Cable ===
- Atlanta Interfaith Broadcasters
- CobbTV
- Cobb edTV

== Internet ==
=== Publishing ===
- Atlanta Daily World
- South7585News (www.south7585news.com)covers Intown South including areas such as Southwest Atlanta, South Atlanta and Downtown
- Decaturish.com (subsidiary of Appen Media Group)

=== Radio ===
- WMRE

== See also ==
- List of Atlanta broadcast stations by location
- Georgia media
  - List of newspapers in Georgia (U.S. state)
  - List of radio stations in Georgia (U.S. state)
  - List of television stations in Georgia (U.S. state)
  - Media of cities in Georgia: Athens, Augusta, Columbus, Macon, Savannah
