= WMLB =

Simulcasts WCPT Willow Springs, Illinois
- Avondale Estates, Georgia; United States
- Broadcast area: Atlanta metropolitan area
- Frequency: 1690 kHz
- Branding: WCPT 820

Programming
- Format: Progressive talk radio
- Affiliations: AP Radio News; NBC News Radio; Pacifica Radio; Westwood One; Alabama Crimson Tide; Pittsburgh Steelers

Ownership
- Owner: John Fredericks; (Disruptor Radio, LLC)
- Operator: Heartland Signal, LLC

History
- First air date: January 9, 1998; 28 years ago (as WAXD)
- Former call signs: WAXD (1998–2000); WSWK (2000–2004); WWAA (2004–2006)
- Call sign meaning: Mountain Lake Broadcasting, from station originally established in Cumming, Georgia (not affiliated with Major League Baseball)

Technical information
- Licensing authority: FCC
- Facility ID: 87118
- Class: B
- Power: 10,000 watts day 1,000 watts night
- Transmitter coordinates: 33.809444°N 84.353889°W

Links
- Public license information: Public file; LMS
- Website: WMLB Online

WMLB (1690 AM) is an expanded band radio station licensed to Avondale Estates, Georgia, and serving the Metro Atlanta radio market. The station broadcasts with 10,000 watts daytime and 1,000 watts at night.

== History ==
WMLB originated as the expanded band "twin" of an existing station on the standard AM band. On March 17, 1997, the Federal Communications Commission (FCC) announced that 88 stations had been given permission to move to newly available "Expanded Band" transmitting frequencies, ranging from 1610 to 1700 kHz, with WBIT in Adel, Georgia, authorized to move from 1470 to 1690 kHz.

A construction permit for the expanded band station was assigned the call WAXD on January 9, 1998. The call letters were changed to WSWK on November 1, 2000, and in 2003, the station originally signed on from Adel in south Georgia with a tourist information format, identifying as "Wild Adventures Radio" and simulcasting WDDQ (92.1 FM) with the same format.

The station moved to the Atlanta radio market in 2004, when the community-of-license changed to Avondale Estates. When the station was moved to the Atlanta area, its transmitter was co-located with station WATB's, and WSWK's signal was diplexed onto one of WATB's antennas. Later in 2004, the station's transmitter was moved to a new dedicated facility off of Cheshire Bridge Road in Atlanta with a new single-tower antenna.

The station debuted in the Atlanta market with a country music format. By September 2004, it had changed formats to become a talk radio station: it joined Air America Radio, a network featuring progressive talk shows. The format change came with a change to the WWAA callsign.

The single broadcast tower in the foreground was used by WMLB from 2006 until 2013.

An FCC policy stated that both an original station and its expanded band counterpart could operate simultaneously for up to five years, after which owners would have to turn in one of the two licenses, depending on whether they preferred the new assignment or elected to remain on the original frequency. It was ultimately decided to transfer full operations to the expanded band station, and on February 18, 2005, the license for original station, WBIT on 1470 kHz in Adel, was cancelled.

In June 2006, JW Broadcasting, owners of station WMLB on 1160 AM, purchased WWAA, and transferred the WMLB call sign and its eclectic format to 1690 kHz. The new format included classical and folk music, jazz, show tunes, comedy bits, classic country music and some rock and roll. Several original programs included "Reflections on Flash Fiction", hosted by Professors Marshall Duke and Walter Reed of Emory University, and Sidewalk Radio, hosted by local entrepreneur and real estate agent Gene Kansas. One Air America program, The Al Franken Show, remained until Franken's last show in February 2007. (The previous WMLB on 1160 AM became talk radio WCFO, "News Talk 1160", which was bought by a Catholic radio organization in 2018.)

In early February 2013, WMLB moved its transmitter location a few hundred feet away across Cheshire Bridge in Atlanta. This transmitter is co-located with WNIV and WAFS, with all three stations sharing the same single vertical broadcast antenna tower. The single broadcasting antenna tower, which WMLB used exclusively from 2006 until 2013, was dismantled.

WMLB went silent in the early morning of May 14, 2018, (sometime between 12:10 a.m. and 1:10 a.m. EDT), after the studio lease ended. However, JW Broadcasting continued to own the broadcast tower, and the online streaming continued to play music, hourly updates from CBS Radio News and station identifications until May 15.

Previous logo

By mid-2020, WMLB resumed broadcasting, playing oldies music and old interviews. On March 1, 2021, the station changed formats from oldies to conservative talk, branded as "Freedom 1690".
