= History of television in Atlanta =

This article is intended to give an overview of the History of television in Atlanta.

== Pre-history of Atlanta TV ==
Atlanta television had its roots in Atlanta Journal (now Atlanta Journal-Constitution)-owned radio station WSB-AM. The Journal had launched the south's first radio station, WSB AM ("Welcome South Brother"), on 740 kHz (now 750) on March 15, 1922. In the late 1920s, the Journal experimented with a mechanical version of television, but eventually abandoned it. The earliest experiments with television involved a spinning disc with multiple holes in it, which provided ‘movement' on a projected surface.

== Early stations ==
=== WSB, channel 8 ===
Television finally came to Atlanta-area and northern- and upper central-Georgia viewers on September 29, 1948 (called "T-Day" by the Journal) with the debut of WSB-TV, broadcasting on VHF channel 8. The newspaper led up to the TV station's launch, with front-page countdowns designed to boost excitement and sell TV sets. The inaugural WSB-TV program, which began with a recording of "The Star-Spangled Banner" and a close-up shot of a tiny American flag waving in the wind powered by an electric fan, featured announcer John Cone ("WSB-TV is on the air!"), newscaster Jimmy Bridges, and a host of local dignitaries.

WSB-TV originally broadcast from the Biltmore Hotel. They moved to a building at 1601 West Peachtree Street, about two miles (3 km) north on Peachtree Street in 1956. The building, designed to look like a southern mansion, was christened "White Columns".

WSB-TV, in its abbreviated 4 p.m. to 10 p.m. broadcast day, aired a mix of kinescopes (film copies) which might arrive three days late from the NBC television network (WSB-AM had been a longtime NBC radio network affiliate, and most of the new television equipment was from NBC's corporate cousin, RCA), Atlanta Crackers baseball remote broadcasts from the club's stadium on Ponce de Leon Avenue, local news, and kids shows (Woody Willow, a marionette show featuring several stringed characters created and performed by Don and Ruth Gilpin, and a show featuring a man who built toys). A great many old movies were shown, and the station employed a unique censorship system in which monitors actually cut bits from film that were deemed "not family material" before broadcast. This was a slow and tedious process, handled by two women with scissors, and they usually removed any hint of unsavory language and even scenes in which a man and a woman (even married couples) might be seen in or on a bed.

An early unique use of television occurred when a system-wide transit strike crippled the city and downtown commerce suffered, in an era before shopping malls had been developed in the suburban areas. WSB-TV broadcast, for a time, a daily four-hour "infomercial" (to use the modern term) for Rich's department store, which was affected economically when shoppers could not travel via bus to its downtown location.

In its earliest days, the station aired a test pattern for many hours each day, ostensibly to let people align their new-fangled television sets. It served, however, as extremely cheap "programming" which allowed an audience to gather as someone showed off his or her new set to his or her envious friends. The test pattern, in black and white, featured multiple shades of grey and a large picture of a Native American (the ubiquitous and now-classic Indian Head test card). Early employee Mike McDougald recounted, "I would drive from WSB-AM to WSB-TV and see people congregated outside the store windows watching the test pattern. They were fascinated by it." Virtually all employees of the new WSB-TV were "imports" from the radio station, leaving the radio side somewhat hampered by the loss of talent. WSB-AM continued to thrive, however, and actually supported the new television venture for several years until television moved into the "black".

=== WAGA-TV, channel 5 ===
Crosstown radio station WAGA-AM (now WYZE, 1480 AM), owned by The Fort Industries (later renamed "Storer Broadcasting"), launched a station on channel 5 in the fall of 1949, taking CBS, DuMont and occasionally, ABC shows. The new television operation was squeezed into a converted residential house on Peachtree Street, with a tall tower built in the backyard of the property. WAGA-TV's mascot, owned by the station's janitor, was a (real) Yorkshire Terrier named "Waga".

In addition to CBS shows, WAGA aired a daily hillbilly music show with local personality Jon Farmer, Atlanta Crackers baseball (taken from WSB and later lost to newcomer WLW-A), interview shows featuring politicians like Senator Herman Talmadge and local newscasts featuring a newsreader sitting at a modest desk with a world map on the wall behind.

=== The proposed WCON-TV ===
WSB-TV and WAGA-TV served Atlanta for two years before a third station arrived. In March 1950, the Cox-owned Atlanta Journal and its crosstown rival, the Atlanta Constitution, merged. The Constitution owned a construction permit for a proposed WCON-TV on the more desirable channel 2 (reaching a larger broadcast range due to lower frequency), which was to have been the city's full-time ABC network station. With the merger, WSB-TV instead moved to channel 2 amid great publicity. WCON-TV thus never opened for business, and its sister radio station, WCON AM 550, was reassigned to nearby Gainesville, Georgia, where it is now WDUN.

=== WLTV, channel 8 ===
WSB-TV's move to channel 2 opened an opportunity for a new station to operate on channel 8. In 1951, a group of Atlanta businessmen, including an executive from the local Davison's department store chain, pooled their capital and launched WLTV as Atlanta's first full-time ABC affiliate. WLTV's studios were installed in a small building directly behind WSB-TV's property, because that allowed the station to utilize WSB's old channel 8 transmitting tower. WLTV operated on a very tight budget and offered a smattering of local programming like cooking and fashion shows, "rip-and-read" local news coverage, and a show featuring the city's famous mayor, William B. Hartsfield, who answered viewer mail on his program. The station also offered the first "all Negro" program in Atlanta, a Saturday evening variety show.

=== WQXI, channel 36 ===
In late 1953, eager entrepreneurs around the country were constructing UHF TV stations to meet the demand of television-hungry viewers. Southeast radio group owner Robert Rounsaville opened a UHF station off Atlanta's Peachtree Street in the same restored house where his "good music" station, WQXI AM 790, operated. An employee remembered that the station owned a huge, lumbering TV camera that had to be transported from room to room within the building to broadcast local talk shows. The AM station promoted the TV station incessantly, but the September 1953 beginning was met with indifference from Atlantans. Without much in the way of programming apart from old movies, an occasional show from the crumbling DuMont network, and a local Saturday night "Barn Dance," there was little incentive for viewers to spend approximately $40 for a UHF converter. As such, WQXI-TV survived about nine months.

=== WETV, channel 47, Macon ===
While not an Atlanta station, Macon's first TV outlet received little attention from viewers or the press. In 1954, competing Macon AM radio stations WBML and WNEX pooled money, along with Macon businessman William Fickling, (later a healthcare tycoon) and launched WETV on channel 47. The NBC affiliate pre-dated the market's dominant CBS affiliate WMAZ, channel 13, by several months. As in Atlanta and other cities, few viewers were willing to pay extra for the special receiver needed to watch the UHF station, and after several shakeups (where channel 47 became WNEX-TV and then WOKA), it ceased operations. WMAZ would then become the central Georgia region's sole commercial television outlet for over a dozen years, until NBC returned in 1968 on another UHF station, WCWB-TV (now WMGT-TV) on channel 41. By that time, television manufacturers had been required by the Federal Communications Commission (under the All-Channel Receiver Act) to enable sets to receive UHF channels, without special external equipment.

=== WLWA, channels 8/11 ===
In 1953, Cincinnati-based Crosley Broadcasting Corporation purchased WLTV (channel 8), providing a much-needed infusion of capital and a new name, "WLW-A", in keeping with the company's WLW group branding for its stations in Indiana and Ohio. Among the personalities from WLW-A's early days: Dick Van Dyke, who hosted a twice-daily lip synch show where he and Phil Erickson (together known as The Merry Mutes), along with a female partner, mouthed the lyrics to hit records. WLW-A continued to operate in the shadow of WSB-TV, both physically and in the minds of 1950s viewers. It wasn't until ABC began to get ratings traction with its late-1950s Warner Bros. Western shows that the station came of age.

=== WROM-TV, channel 9, Rome ===
Two months after Crosley set up shop in Atlanta, up the road, about 50 miles (80 km) to the northwest, the owners of a local AM radio station in Rome decided to get into television.

WROM AM operated WROM-TV, channel 9, from 1953 until 1958, branding it "Dixie's Largest Independent." The station ran a late-afternoon and prime-time schedule of old movies, "hillbilly" music performances (which were common on Southern TV stations in the 1950s and 1960s) and occasionally, ABC-TV network fare such as Omnibus.

WROM's beginning, and its subsequent move to Chattanooga years later, changed Atlanta TV history and caused a fruit-basket turnover of Southeastern U.S. TV frequencies. As soon as channel 9 in Rome and channel 8 in Atlanta began operating simultaneously, viewers in northwestern Atlanta and in northwestern Georgia to the south of Rome began experiencing trouble tuning in either station. Crosley also wanted to increase transmitting power at its new station, which necessitated a change to present-day channel 11 (now WXIA-TV).

By 1958, WROM's owners were making moves to cash in on their investment. The station began carrying a full prime-time slate of ABC network programs, overlapping programming with WLWA.

In 1959, WROM's owners accepted an offer to sell their TV outlet to Martin Theaters, (reportedly for one million dollars) the company that also purchased Columbus, Georgia's WDAK-TV. Chattanooga had only two VHF stations at the time, WRGP (now WRCB)-TV, channel 3, (NBC) and pioneer broadcasting outlet WDEF-TV, channel 12 (CBS). Chattanooga offered channel 9's investors a better economic model than Rome, so the station moved and became Chattanooga ABC affiliate WTVC. That move 60 miles to the north opened opportunities for other television broadcasters within the state of Georgia.

== Frequency changes ==
Atlanta regained channel 8 as an available frequency, though it was reclassified as a non-commercial educational facility, clearing the way for the University of Georgia's Athens-based station, WGTV (which, years later, relocated to its transmitter and tower to Stone Mountain to better serve Atlanta as part of Georgia Public Broadcasting's state network). Columbus, Georgia's NBC affiliate, WDAK-TV, channel 28, was able to move to VHF channel 9 (now WTVM, an ABC affiliate), while Dothan, Alabama's CBS affiliate, WTVY, moved from channel 9 to the more powerful (and thus desirable) channel 4, and Columbus' CBS affiliate, WRBL, moved from channel 4 over to channel 3.

Ironically, Rome partially lost a second television frequency 40 years later, when UHF station channel 14 moved east to Bear Mountain near Waleska and Canton (north of Atlanta) after several years of operation. Though a strong radio market covering most of northwestern Georgia, the Rome metro area simply could not support television capable of competing with Chattanooga and Atlanta, both just 60 miles (100 km) distant north and southeast. Rome still remain's the city of license for the station, however, and it is one of two full-power TV stations having a northwest Georgia city of license, along with GPB's WCLP-TV 18 (now WNGH-TV 18.x, on RF channel 33) in Fort Mountain State Park near Chatsworth.

=== Digital changes ===
Since prior to the 2009 digital-only TV mandate, all local TV stations except WGTV 8 transmit digitally on channels other than their analog ones, with TV channels from 52 to 69 (the 700 MHz band) being taken mostly for 4G LTE mobile phones in a large spectrum auction (FCC auction 73). (WGCL-TV 46 remained on for another month as the designated "nightlight" station, WUVM-LP 4 and WTBS-LP 6 continue in analog as of April 2017.)

Unlike other major media markets, no Atlanta TV stations will be taken off the air due to the 600MHz auction which ended in early 2017, but UHF channels 38 to 51 are being taken away, which will result in a "repack" of at least half of the local stations onto low UHF channels 14 to 36 in late summer 2019, and WGTV from 8 to 7 in 2020. All stations will still retain their historic channel numbers through the use of virtual channels, but re-scanning of TV tuners will be required after the changes.

WUVG will move from 48 to 18, WUPA from 43 to 36, WSB from 39 to 32, WIRE from 40 to 33, WKTB from 47 to 23, WATC from 41 to 34, WHSG from 44 to 22, and WSKC from 22 to 14. Also included in the same fifth nationwide round of channel repacking, WANN, WPCH, WPXA, and WYGA will do a four-way frequency swap, moving from physical channels 29, 20, 31, and 16 to channels 20, 31, 16, and 29, respectively, in order to make room on those channels for stations in adjacent TV markets and avoid co-channel interference with them. No local stations are moving to VHF channels 2 to 13, but WGTV will change from 8 to 7 In the final repacking round in 2020. No Atlanta-market stations are channel sharing or going off-air due to the reverse auction 1000, but two nearby GPB stations won bids to move from UHF to VHF: WNGH-TV and WJSP-TV.
