= WCON =

WCON may refer to:

- WCON (AM) 1450, a radio station licensed to serve Cornelia, Georgia, United States
- WCON-FM 99.3, a radio station also licensed to serve Cornelia, Georgia, United States
- WCON-TV 2, an unbuilt TV station permit owned by the Atlanta Constitution newspaper, which merged in the 1950s with the Atlanta Journal and WSB-TV 8, which then moved to channel 2
