= WTZA =

WTZA may refer to:

- WXKG, a radio station (1010 AM) licensed to serve Atlanta, Georgia, United States, which held the call sign WTZA from 2013 to 2023
- WRNN-TV, a television station (channel 25, virtual 48) licensed to serve New Rochelle, New York, United States, which held the call sign WTZA from 1983 to 1995
