= WGKA =

Talk radio station in Atlanta, Georgia, United States

- Atlanta, Georgia; United States
- Broadcast area: Atlanta metropolitan area
- Frequency: 920 kHz
- Branding: AM 920 The Answer

Programming
- Language: English
- Format: Conservative talk radio
- Affiliations: Salem Radio Network; Townhall; Clemson Tigers football network

Ownership
- Owner: Salem Media Group; (Salem Communications Holding Corporation)
- Sister stations: WDWD; WLTA; WNIV

History
- First air date: January 14, 1924; 102 years ago
- Former call signs: WBBF (1924–1925); WGST (1925–1989); WAFS (1989–2004)
- Former frequencies: 1110 kHz (1924–1928); 890 kHz (1928–1941)
- Call sign meaning: Glenkaren Associates

Technical information
- Licensing authority: FCC
- Facility ID: 65976
- Class: B
- Power: 14,000 watts (day); 490 watts (night)
- Transmitter coordinates: 33.809863°N 84.356117°W

Links
- Public license information: Public file; LMS
- Webcast: Listen live; Listen live (via Audacy); Listen live (via iHeartRadio)
- Website: am920theanswer.com

WGKA (920 AM) branded AM 920 The Answer is a commercial conservative talk radio station licensed to Atlanta, Georgia, serving primarily the Atlanta metropolitan area. Currently owned by Salem Media Group, WGKA serves as the Atlanta affiliate for the Salem Radio Network and the Clemson Tigers football radio network. WGKA's studios are located on Peachtree Street in Atlanta, while its transmitter is located near the Morningside Nature Preserve.

== History ==
=== WBBF ===
The station was first licensed by the U.S. Department of Commerce on 1110 kilocycles, on January 7, 1924; owned by the Georgia Institute of Technology, then known as the "Georgia School of Technology", it was issued the sequentially issued call sign of WBBF. Much of the initial station equipment had been donated by the Atlanta Constitution newspaper, which had closed its station, WGM, the previous July. This donation to the electrical engineering students was made to help familiarize them with the new technology used for radio broadcasting.

WBBF's debut broadcast was made on the evening of January 14, 1924, beginning at 7:30 p.m. with a ten-minute address by President M. L. Brittain. He lauded "the generosity of Editor Clark Howell and The Constitution". The Atlanta Constitution reported that he also "expressed the gratitude of the institution to The Constitution for presenting without cost to Tech the powerful broadcasting equipment." The program finished at 8:30 with fifty band students playing the college's fight song, "Ramblin' Wreck." The station's initial schedule was limited to a single one-hour program on Monday evenings; WBBF suspended operations in early June for summer vacation, before resuming in September.

=== WGST ===
On January 12, 1925, WBBF's call letters were changed to WGST (Georgia School of Technology). In 1928, as part of the implementation of the Federal Radio Commission's General Order 40, the station moved to 890 kHz. In April 1930, the school made an agreement with the Southern Broadcasting Stations, Inc. to operate WGST as a commercial station, while still under the oversight of Georgia Tech. WGST was a CBS Radio Network affiliate, carrying its dramas, comedies, news, sports, game shows, soap operas and big band broadcasts during the "Golden Age of Radio."

In March 1941, under the provisions of the North American Regional Broadcasting Agreement (NARBA), stations transmitting on 890 kHz were moved to 920 kHz, where WGST and its successors have been ever since. During the 1940s, the studios and offices were located in the Forsyth Building in Downtown Atlanta. For many years the antenna was old-fashioned design using multi-strand horizontal wires, strung between two supporting towers on the Forsyth Building, across from Georgia Tech's campus.

In the late 1940s, WGST lost its CBS affiliation to WAGA (590 AM); WGST joined the Mutual Broadcasting System and later became an ABC Radio affiliate in the 1950s.

WGST was the first station to play rock 'n roll in Atlanta in the 1950s. Radio personality Paul Drew made his debut on WGST with a weekend show "The Big Record." Ray Charles' song "I Got a Woman" was recorded at WGST in the early 1950s. In 1956, WGST moved next to the Alexander Memorial Coliseum on the Georgia Tech campus. The station's facilities were built on top of the Coliseum's locker rooms, featuring two large studios for live performances, complete with grand pianos. They remained in use by WGST into the 1970s; starting in 1977, Georgia Tech's FM radio station, WREK, occupied most of the original studios, including one of the two big rooms, until 2004 when WREK moved to the current studios in the Georgia Tech Student Center.

Through most of the 1960s, WGST ran a Top 40 radio format, but by the late 1960s it changed to middle of the road music, in an attempt to cut into WSB's audience. In 1971, WGST switched back to Top 40, and was billed simply as "92". By 1972, the station had changed to a Solid Gold Oldies format. In 1973, it adopted a mix of oldies and adult contemporary music. The station did fairly well in the Arbitron ratings (now Nielsen Audio), but it was stronger at night, particularly in the male 25-49 demographic, boosted in part when WGST became the flagship station for the Atlanta Flames hockey broadcasts. The station continued with its long-running Georgia Tech Football Network and Georgia Tech Basketball broadcasts.

As the city kept growing, it was difficult to hear the station in some of Atlanta's suburbs. That made it hard to achieve numbers comparable to ratings king WSB, which is powered at 50,000 watts around the clock. WGST ran at 5,000 watts by day, but dropped to 1,000 watts at night, to protect other stations on the frequency. In 1968, Georgia Tech put an FM station, WREK, on the air. In 1973, the Georgia Board of Regents decided WGST was "surplus property." In 1974, it was sold for five million dollars to the Meredith Corporation, despite opposition from alumni groups, members of the Georgia General Assembly and even the Governor of Georgia. However, profits from the sale were used to upgrade Georgia Tech's student-run WREK, which in 1978 moved to the Coliseum studios vacated by WGST in 1975.

Under the Meredith Corporation, WGST tried to compete with WSB by becoming a full service Top 40 station and hiring big name DJs such as Chuck Daugherty, Sam Holman from WABC in New York City, Tony Taylor from WNBC, also in New York, and Skinny Bobby Harper, who came from Kansas City. But WGST's ratings languished, despite the high-priced talent Meredith had assembled. By October 1977, WGST switched to an all-news format. But it began adding some talk shows by 1980 and in 1983, hired Neal Boortz who already had experience hosting on Atlanta talk station WRNG (now WCNN). Boortz became the cornerstone for the WGST talk line-up.

In 1985, WGST was acquired by Jacor Communications, which already owned easy listening FM station WPCH (94.9 FM).

=== WAFS ===
In 1988, WPBD (640 AM) began operations, although the owners soon announced that the station was for sale. Jacor made arrangements to purchase WPBD and transfer WGST's call letters and format onto the new station. As part of these moves, Jacor divested WGST to the Moody Bible Institute, a Christian radio organization in Chicago, for $2.3 million. On June 30, 1989, Moody changed WGST's callsign to WAFS and changed format from news/talk to Christian talk and teaching; Jacor concurrently changed WPBD's call letters to WGST.

WAFS became the Atlanta affiliate of Moody Radio, which lasted until 2004.

=== WGKA ===
Previous logo

The Moody Bible Institute sold WAFS on March 24, 2004, to Salem Communications. On August 2, 2004, Salem swapped call letters between its two stations on 920 and 1190 kHz, which resulted in the WGKA call letters moving to 920 kHz, and the WAFS call letters now appearing at 1190 kHz.

On January 5, 2015, WGKA was rebranded as "920 The Answer". It began airing many of the Salem Radio Network conservative talk hosts.

Beginning in the Fall of 2018, WGKA became the Atlanta home for Clemson Tigers football games, taking over from WCFO, which had switched to a Catholic radio format.
