= WDWD =

- Atlanta, Georgia; United States
- Broadcast area: Atlanta metropolitan area
- Frequency: 590 kHz
- Branding: Faith Talk 590

Programming
- Format: Christian radio
- Affiliations: SRN News

Ownership
- Owner: Salem Media Group; (Salem Communications Holding Corporation)
- Sister stations: WGKA; WLTA; WNIV

History
- First air date: August 1, 1937
- Former call signs: WAGA (1937–1959); WPLO (1959–1987); WKHX (1987–1997)
- Former frequencies: 1450 kHz (1937–1941); 1480 kHz (1941–1942)
- Call sign meaning: Walt Disney, co-founder of The Walt Disney Company, former owner

Technical information
- Licensing authority: FCC
- Facility ID: 8623
- Class: B
- Power: 12,000 watts (day); 4,500 watts (night)
- Transmitter coordinates: 33.845692°N 84.64439°W

Links
- Public license information: Public file; LMS
- Webcast: Listen live; Listen live (via Audacy); Listen live (via iHeartRadio)
- Website: www.faithtalk590.com

WDWD (590 AM; "Faith Talk 590") is a commercial radio station in Atlanta, Georgia. It is owned by the Salem Media Group and it airs a Christian radio format. The studios are in Buckhead Center on Peachtree Road NW (U.S. Route 19).

WDWD's radio transmitter site is off Sanders Road in Austell, Georgia, near Noses Creek. The station uses a directional antenna with a four-tower array, aimed towards Atlanta and avoiding interference with WWLX in Loretto, Tennessee. In 2009, the station upgraded its daytime power from 5,000 to 12,000 watts, while the nighttime power remains at 4,500 watts. Also in 2009, the station started broadcasting in the AM HD Radio (hybrid digital) mode (which has been unavailable since 2013).

== History ==
=== WAGA ===
The station signed on the air on August 1, 1937. Its call sign was WAGA, meaning Atlanta, Georgia. It was once the sister station of WAGA-TV, now Atlanta's Fox TV station. WAGA was powered at 1,000 watts by day and 500 watts at night.

The Atlanta Journal newspaper, which owned Atlanta's top station, WSB, had difficulty choosing between the two NBC radio networks, the Red Network and the Blue Network. Thus, the Journal established WAGA to carry the Blue Network while WSB carried programming from the Red Network. WAGA's on-air slogan during the station's early days was "Atlanta's Wave of Welcome". The studios were located in the Western Union Building (current location of Telecom Tower, on the SW corner of Marietta Street and Forsyth Street) in downtown Atlanta. WAGA's transmitter was located at Sugar Creek, three miles from the center of Atlanta. The station moved from 1450 kilocycles to 1480 in 1941, following the enactment of the North American Regional Broadcasting Agreement (NARBA). It then moved to the better dial position of 590 AM in 1942. The 1480 kHz frequency later returned to the air under a new license as WYZE, with no affiliation to WAGA.

Due to FCC rules limiting station ownership, the Journal sold WAGA to Fort Industry Broadcasting of Toledo, Ohio, in the 1940s. In 1948, WAGA acquired an FM sister station when WAGA-FM (now WVEE) began broadcasting. A year later, WAGA-TV signed on as Atlanta's second television station. Fort Industry changed its name to Storer Broadcasting in 1952.

=== Plough ownership ===
In 1959, WAGA began playing Top 40 hits. The call sign changed to WPLO, which stood for Plough. The station was sold to the broadcasting arm of Plough, Inc., a pharmaceutical company. (FCC rules at the time made call sign change compulsory if a sister television or radio station was sold.)

The Top 40 sound ended in 1966, when WPLO switched to a country music format. In 1987, the station changed its call letters to WKHX and adopted the "Kicks 590" slogan still used on WKHX-FM 101.5. The two stations began simulcasting. WKHX 590 once broadcast using the Kahn/Hazeltine AM stereo system. It aired a classic country format beginning in October 1992.

=== Radio Disney ===
The country format ended in 1996. On November 18th at 5 a.m., the station flipped to children's radio. It adopted the Radio Disney format with the call sign changing to WDWD.

In September 2009, the station was forced off the air for a week when nearby Noses Creek flooded. The creek reached double its flood stage during the historic record-breaking 2009 Atlanta floods. The station had been shut down prior to the flood and the equipment was disassembled and thoroughly cleaned. When the flood waters receded, nearly all of the equipment was salvaged since there had been no short circuiting from the water.

On August 13, 2014, The Walt Disney Company put WDWD and 22 other Radio Disney stations up for sale, in order to focus more on digital distribution of the Radio Disney network. Disney originally planned to temporarily shut down the station on September 26, 2014. However, the station remained on the air with Radio Disney programming until it was sold.

=== Salem Communications ===
On February 25, 2015, Radio Disney Atlanta filed to sell WDWD to South Texas Broadcasting, Inc., a subsidiary of the Salem Media Group. Salem bought the station for $2.75 million. The application to assign the station license was granted by the U.S. Federal Communications Commission on April 13, 2015, and the purchase was consummated on May 7, 2015.

On March 10, 2015, Salem Media CEO Ed Atsinger revealed that Salem would move the WNIV/WLTA programming to WDWD after the completion of the sale. On May 2, 2015, WDWD dropped Radio Disney and went silent, ahead of the sale's completion. On May 11, the station returned with a Christian talk format, branded as "Faith Talk 590", with programming from Salem Radio Network. At one time, Salem owned five stations in Metro Atlanta, including WDWD. However, WAFS 1190 AM has been sold to Relevant Radio for its Catholic radio network. And WFSH 104.7 FM was sold to the Educational Media Foundation for its Air1 worship music network.
