= Bear Mountain (Georgia) =

Mountain in Georgia, United States

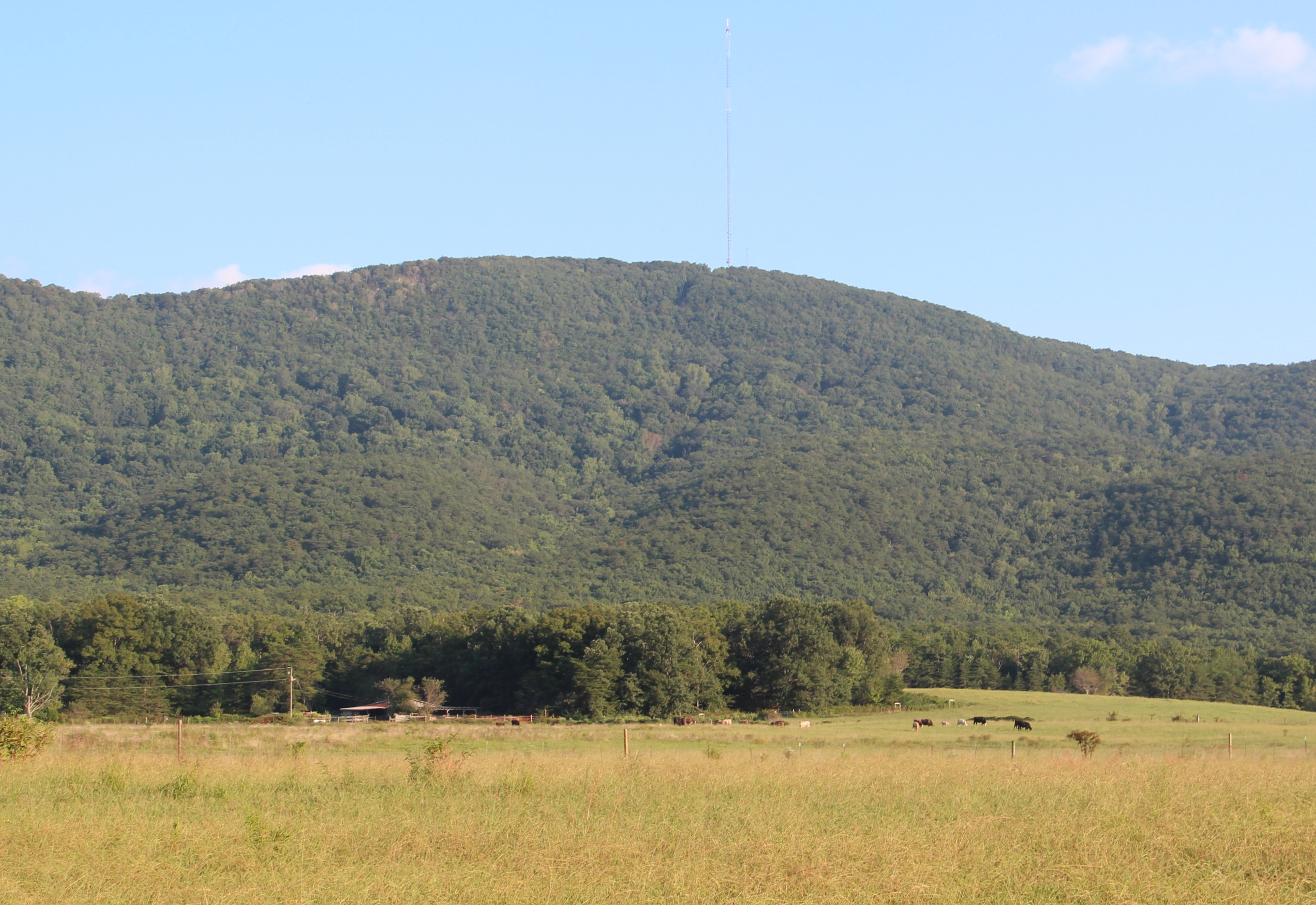
- Bear Mountain

Highest point
- Elevation: 2,307 ft (703 m) NGVD 29
- Prominence: 1287 (392 m)
- Coordinates: 34°18′48″N 84°38′53″W

Geography
- Location within Georgia
- Location: Cherokee County, Georgia, U.S.
- Parent range: Appalachian Mountains
- Topo map: USGS White East

Bear Mountain is a mountain located in the foothills of the Appalachian Mountains, southwest of Waleska, Georgia. Situated between the northwest and west-central part of Cherokee County, Georgia, it is the highest point in the county at 2,307 feet (703 m). Lake Arrowhead lies to the east-southeast at the foot of the mountain 1,287 feet below. Just to the west runs the Bartow/Cherokee county line.

For media in Atlanta, there are two broadcast stations on the mountain. The TV tower is that of 1000-kilowatt WPXA-TV 31 (14.x), also the site of its former analog TV transmission. Its city of license is Rome, Georgia, two counties to the west, but it is considered part of the Atlanta media market for purposes of must-carry regulations. Because it is so far out of town, and in a different direction for most people, reception of the station is often difficult, especially due to the digital TV format mandated by the FCC. The only other major TV station in northwest Georgia is WNGH-TV 33 (18.x), located much further north.

For FM broadcasting, W213BV on 90.5 (W214AS on 90.7) was a 10-watt broadcast translator for Calvary Chapel of Twin Falls, one of hundreds relaying KAWZ, in this case licensed to serve Waleska. The tower was also the first site for WCHK-FM 105.5, originally a simulcast of WCHK AM 1290, both licensed to serve Canton, Georgia (the county seat). That station changed frequency to 105.7, and after having another tower along Interstate 575, is now WBZY to the southeast on Sweat Mountain. However, the table of allotments still lists Bear Mountain for the station's reservation.

== See also ==
- List of mountains in Georgia (U.S. state)
