= The Atlanta Georgian =

Atlantan daily newspaper (1906–1939)

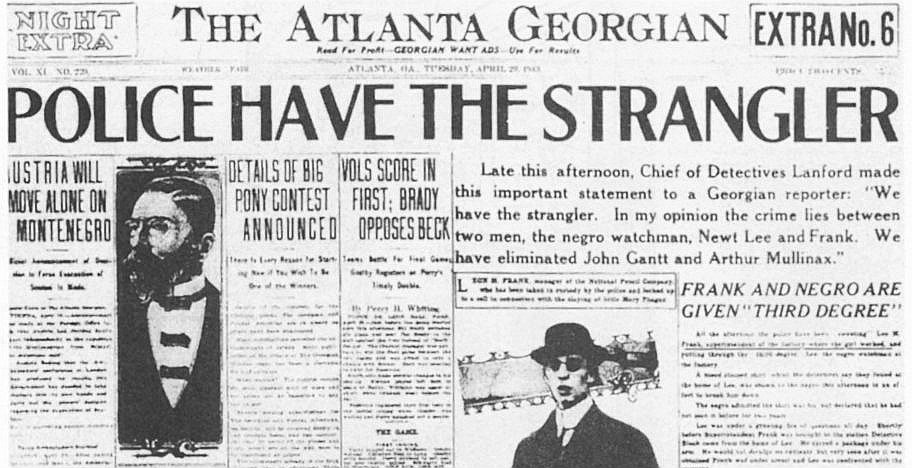
- 1913 front page
- Type: Daily newspaper
- Format: Broadsheet
- Owner(s): Hearst Corporation (1912–1939; James M. Cox (1939; disestablishment)
- Founder: Fred Loring Seely
- Founded: 1906 (120 years ago)
- Ceased publication: 1939 (87 years ago)
- Political alignment: Democratic
- Language: English
- Headquarters: Atlanta, Georgia, United States
- Circulation: 75,178 (peak)

The Atlanta Georgian was an American daily afternoon newspaper in Atlanta, Georgia, United States.

== History ==
Founded by New Jersey native Fred Loring Seely, the first issue was April 25, 1906, with editor John Temple Graves. They mainly criticized saloons and the convict-lease system.

In February 1907, Seely expanded the newspaper by buying out the Atlanta News.

The newspaper was struggling when William Randolph Hearst purchased it in the spring of 1912 (his ninth newspaper property); he transformed it into a yellow press, making it much more successful, if less respected. Journalist James B. Nevin became editor (continuing until his death in 1931) and started the Empty Stocking Fund in 1927. That year the newspaper was awarded the Sutlive Trophy, given by the Georgia Press Association.

By the 1930s, it was the third-largest paper in Atlanta with a circulation of 75,000: far behind the Journal (98,000) and the Constitution (91,000).

In 1939, James M. Cox purchased the newspaper at the same time as The Atlanta Journal (now The Atlanta Journal-Constitution). He closed down the Georgian, with its last issue being December 18, 1939. By this time, the Hearst empire had decreased to fewer than twenty newspapers.

=== Atlanta race riot of 1906 ===
In 1906, The Atlanta Georgian and the Atlanta News, at the behest of gubernatorial candidates Hoke Smith and Clark Howell, began publishing a series of unsubstantiated sensationalized stories claiming that white women were being attacked and raped by black men. This was part of the candidates' attempts to disenfranchise blacks by inciting white fear.

It culminated in the Atlanta race riot on September 22, 1906, when the newspapers reported four alleged attacks on white women by black men. After the newspapers came out, a white mob of over 10,000 gathered and started attacking, beating and stabbing any blacks in the streets, as well as going to places frequented by blacks and assaulting them there. This resulted in the murder of 25–40 African-Americans. None of the culprits were arrested or prosecuted for their crimes.

== See also ==
- List of defunct newspapers of the United States
- List of newspapers in Atlanta
- Media in Atlanta
- List of newspapers in Georgia (U.S. state)
