= Lake Arrowhead, Georgia =

Lake Arrowhead
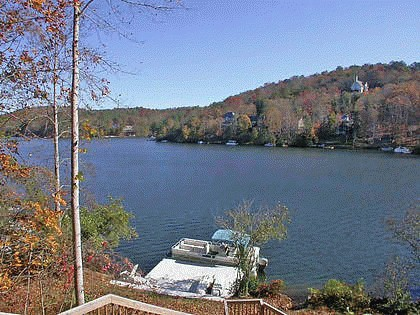

- Location within Georgia Location within the United States
- Location: Cherokee County, Georgia
- Coordinates: 34°17′22″N 84°35′27″W
- Type: reservoir
- Basin countries: United States
- Surface area: 540 acres (2.2 km^{2})
- Average depth: 80 ft (24 m)
- Max. depth: 186 ft (57 m)
- Shore length^{1}: 11 mi (18 km)
- Surface elevation: 1,020 ft (310 m)
- Islands: 1
- ^{1} Shore length is not a well-defined measure.

Lake Arrowhead is located approximately two miles (3 km) west of Waleska, in the mountainous, west-northwestern part of Cherokee County, Georgia, United States. Located just east-southeast of Bear Mountain, it is Georgia's second largest man-made, private lake, covering approximately 540 acres (2.2 km^{2}) and reaching depths of up to 80 feet (24 m).

== Gated community ==
In addition to the actual lake, "Lake Arrowhead" also refers to the lake's surrounding, gated community. The community's property was bought in the 1960s and established in the early 1970s as a remote mountain retreat, but now finds itself at the edge of metro Atlanta's exurban expansion. The small valley Lake Arrowhead sits in and the surrounding community was originally known by local residents as "Lost Town," which was initially settled in the 1840s. Many descendants of the first pioneers still live nearby in the Waleska area.

The private, Lake Arrowhead community consists of two lakes, Lake Arrowhead and Lake Chickasaw, has two security gates, an 18-hole golf course, a clubhouse, boat rentals, a marina, nature trails, a chapel, two community swimming pools, tennis courts and one volunteer fire department; one fulltime fire department. Additionally, the community includes condominium homes, some of which are located on the golf course, and a small, historic cemetery, which consists mostly of graves from the Puckett family, early Lost Town settlers.

== Schools ==
Local, elementary-aged school (kindergarten through fifth grade) children attend R.M. Moore Elementary School STEM Academy in Waleska, while students in sixth grade, seventh grade and eighth grades go to Teasley Middle School in Canton. All high-schoolers (9th to 12th grade) are assigned to Cherokee High School, which is also in Canton. Reinhardt University, a private liberal arts university established in 1883, is located in Waleska.
