= Gwinnett Stripers =

Minor League Baseball team based in Gwinnett County, Georgia

- Founded in 2009; Lawrenceville, Georgia

Team logo	Cap insignia

Minor league affiliations
- Class: Triple-A (2009–present)
- League: International League (2009–present)
- Division: West Division

Major league affiliations
- Team: Atlanta Braves (2009–present)

Minor league titles
- League titles (0): None
- Division titles (2): 2016; 2019
- Wild card berths (1): 2009

Team data
- Name: Gwinnett Stripers (2018–present)
- Previous names: Gwinnett Braves (2009–2017)
- Colors: Navy blue, sea green, red, white
- Mascot: Chopper
- Ballpark: Gwinnett Field (2009–present)
- Owner/ Operator: Diamond Baseball Holdings
- General manager: Erin McCormick
- Manager: Kanekoa Texeira
- Media: MiLB.TV; 99.3 FM
- Website: milb.com/gwinnett

The Gwinnett Stripers are a Minor League Baseball team of the International League (IL) and the Triple-A affiliate of the Atlanta Braves. They play their home games at Gwinnett Field in unincorporated Gwinnett County, Georgia (with a Lawrenceville address) in suburban Atlanta, Georgia. They are named for striped bass in reference to the popularity of fishing in the region.

The team was established in 2009 after the International League's Richmond Braves relocated from Richmond, Virginia. Named the Gwinnett Braves after their major league affiliate, they adopted their current moniker in 2018. The Stripers moved from the IL to the Triple-A East in conjunction with MLB's restructuring of Minor League Baseball in 2021, but this league was renamed the International League in 2022.

== History ==
In January 2008, the Atlanta Braves announced plans to relocate its Triple-A Minor League Baseball affiliate from Richmond, Virginia, to Gwinnett County in suburban Atlanta, Georgia. The move came after years of trying to reach a suitable plan with the city of Richmond to finance the construction of a new stadium to replace The Diamond, which had been home to the Richmond Braves since 1985, or find a new location altogether. The relocated team was to begin play in 2009 at the newly constructed Gwinnett Stadium, renamed Coolray Field in 2010. Known as the Gwinnett Braves, they were members of the Triple-A International League (IL), as were the Richmond Braves who preceded them.

The move to Gwinnett County marked a return home of sorts for the franchise, which traces its roots to the founding of the Atlanta Crackers in 1895. They became the top affiliate of the then-Milwaukee Braves in 1965. When the Braves moved from Milwaukee, Wisconsin, to Atlanta in 1966, they moved the Crackers to Richmond, where the minor league franchise took the name of the parent club.

The Gwinnett Braves played their first game on April 9, 2009, defeating the Charlotte Knights, 9–1, at Knights Stadium in Charlotte, North Carolina. Their first home game was played on April 17. With 10,427 people in attendance, the Braves lost to the visiting Norfolk Tides, 7–4. Their first home win occurred three nights later when Gwinnett defeated the Durham Bulls, 5–2. The Braves ended their inaugural season in second place in the South Division, two games behind Durham, at 81–63. Though failing to win the division title, they did qualify for the International League's wildcard playoff spot under manager Dave Brundage. They were eliminated in the semifinals by the Scranton/Wilkes-Barre Yankees, 3–1.

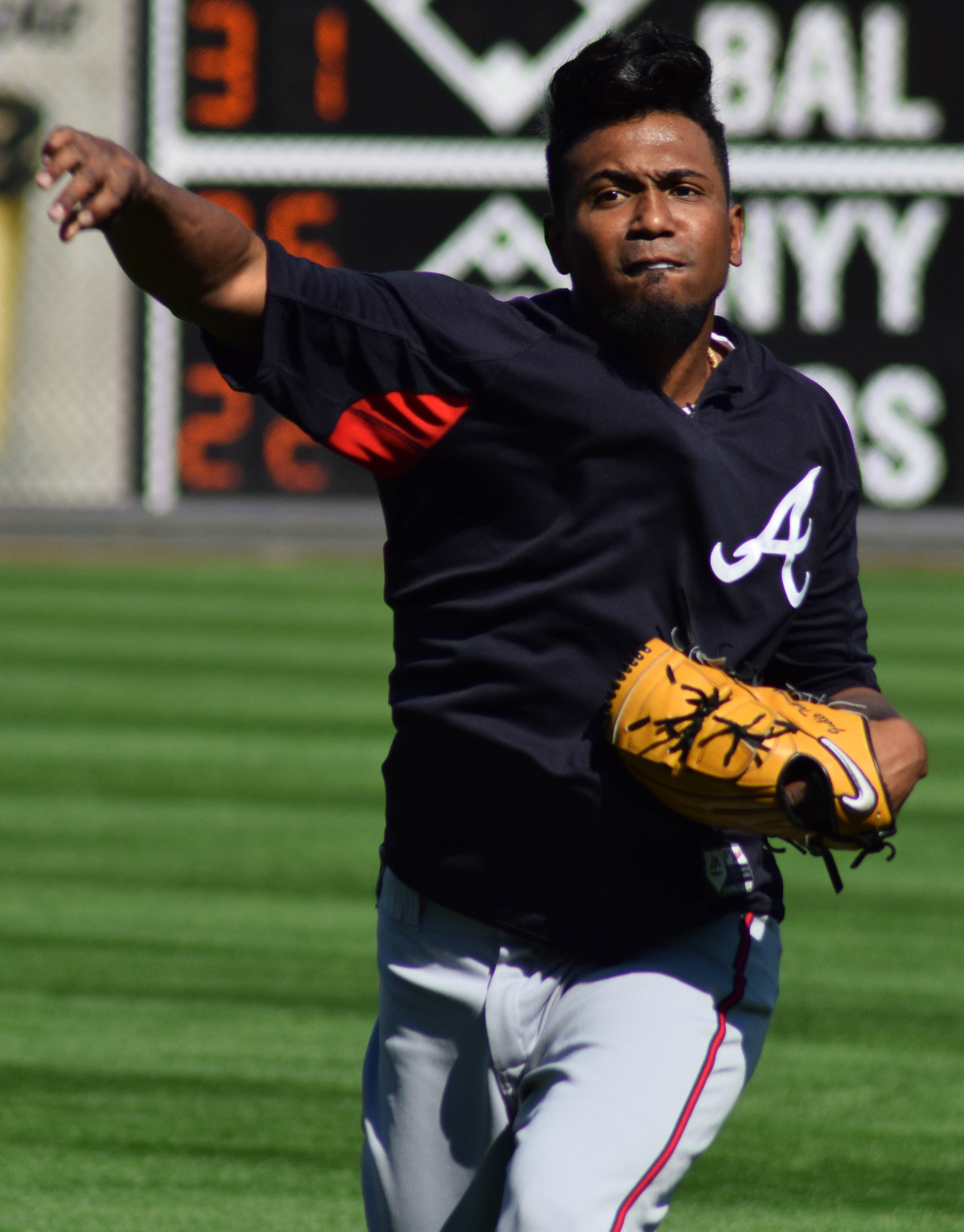
Julio Teherán won the IL's Most Valuable Pitcher and Rookie of the Year Awards in 2011.

From 2010 to 2012, a trio of Gwinnett players won the International League Rookie of the Year Award. First baseman Freddie Freeman won the honor in 2010. At the time of his selection, he led the IL with 147 hits and 240 total bases, was second in batting average (.319), runs batted in (RBI) (87), doubles (35) and extra-base hits (55), and led all first baseman with a .994 fielding percentage. In 2011, Julio Teherán, who also won the Most Valuable Pitcher Award, was the Rookie of the Year after leading the league with 15 wins and a 2.22 ERA in 24 games. First baseman Ernesto Mejía, who led the circuit with 91 RBI, 148 hits, and 253 total bases at the time of his selection, was the 2012 Rookie of the Year.

Despite narrow second-place finishes in 2011 and 2015, the Braves did not return to the postseason until 2016. Manager Brian Snitker led the team until May 17 when he was promoted to manage the major league club in Atlanta. Rick Albert and John Moses, his replacements on an interim basis, led the 2016 Braves to win the South Division title with a 65–78 record. They defeated the Columbus Clippers, 3–1, in the semifinals to advance to the finals of the Governors' Cup playoffs in which they lost the International League championship versus the Scranton/Wilkes-Barre RailRiders, 3–1.

The Braves rebranded as the Gwinnett Stripers prior to the 2018 season. The moniker refers to striped bass, which are fished out of nearby Lake Lanier, and serves as a nod to the popularity of outdoor activities in the region. A name-the-team contest was held to select the nickname. Among the finalists were "Big Mouths", "Buttons", "Gobblers", "Hush Puppies", "Lambchops", and "Sweet Teas". The selection committee initially chose Big Mouths, referring to largemouth bass, but decided Stripers would be a better fit for their vision of the team's identity. The 2019 Stripers won the South Division title with an 80–59 record under Damon Berryhill. They were eliminated from the playoffs in the semifinals by Columbus, 3–1. Berryhill was selected to win the International League Manager of the Year Award.

The start of the 2020 season was postponed due to the COVID-19 pandemic before being cancelled on June 30. Following the 2020 season, Major League Baseball assumed control of Minor League Baseball in a move to increase player salaries, modernize facility standards, and reduce travel. The Braves retained Gwinnett as their Triple-A affiliate. However, the International League disbanded, and the Stripers followed the rest of the IL teams into the Triple-A East. Gwinnett ended the season in third place in the Southeastern Division with a 68–51 record. No playoffs were held to determine a league champion; instead, the team with the best regular-season record was declared the winner. However, 10 games that had been postponed from the start of the season were reinserted into the schedule as a postseason tournament called the Triple-A Final Stretch in which all 30 Triple-A clubs competed for the highest winning percentage. Gwinnett finished the tournament in 25th place with a 3–7 record. In 2022, the Triple-A East became known as the International League, the name historically used by the regional circuit prior to the 2021 reorganization.

The Stripers are located only 35 miles (56 km) from their parent club's home stadium, Truist Park in Cobb County, the third-shortest distance between a Triple-A team and its major-league parent. Only the St. Paul Saints, based 12 miles (19 km) east of Minneapolis, and the Tacoma Rainiers, based 26 miles (42 km) south of Seattle, are closer to their MLB parent clubs. The 2021 season marked the 57th season of affiliation between the Braves and Stripers (and their predecessors), the longest-running affiliation agreement in Triple-A.

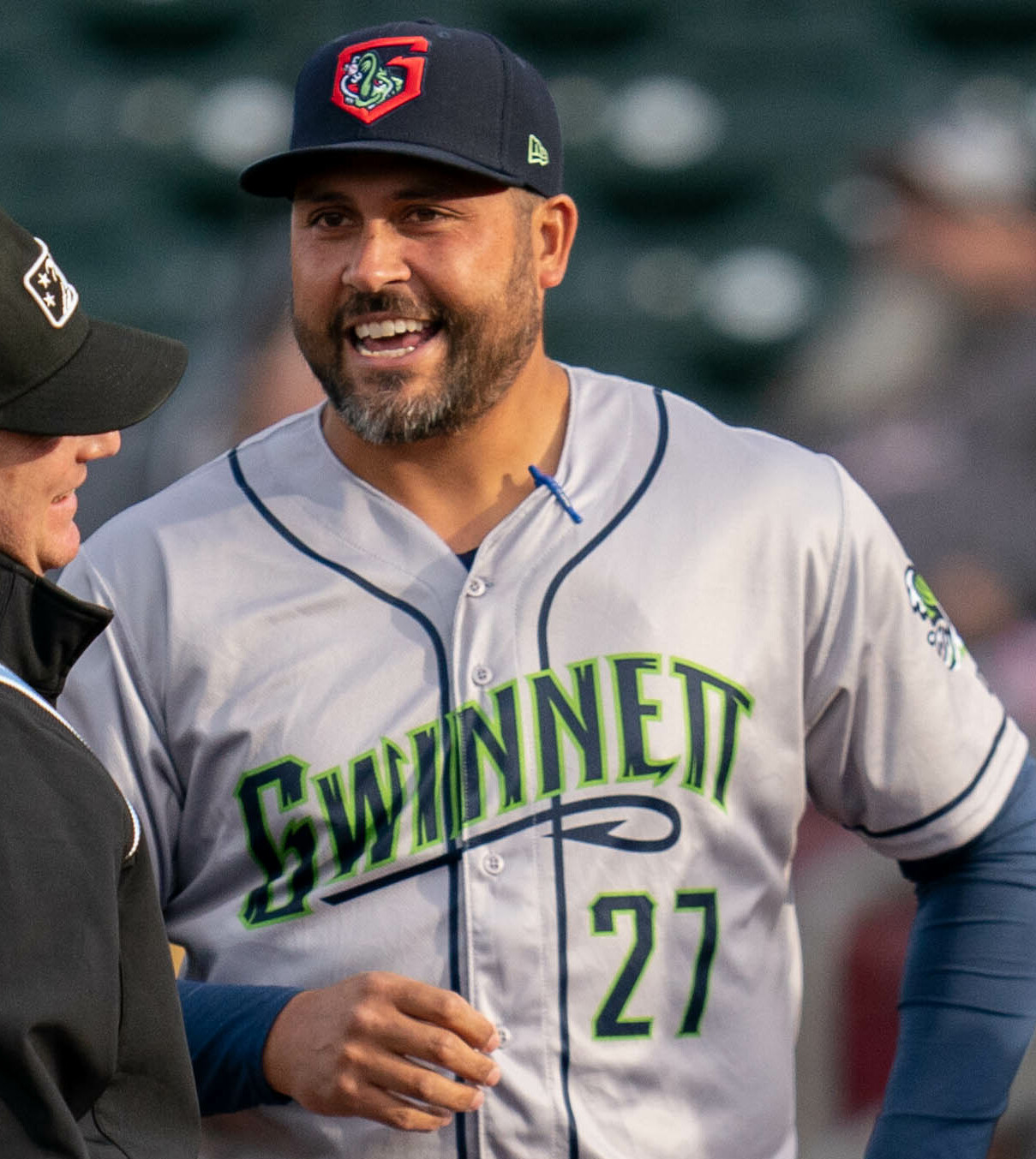
Manager Matt Tuiasosopo with the Stripers in 2023

== Season-by-season records ==
Season-by-season records
Season	League	Regular-season					Postseason			MLB affiliate	Ref.
Season	League	Record	Win %	League	Division	GB	Record	Win %	Result	MLB affiliate	Ref.
2022	IL	69–79	.466	15th	8th	21 1/2	—	—	Result	—	Atlanta Braves
2023	IL	70–78	.473	12th (tie)	6th (tie)	14	—	—	—	Atlanta Braves	
2024	IL	72–78	.480	11th (tie)	6th	18	—	—	—	Atlanta Braves	
2025	IL	63–87	.420	16th	8th	24 1/2	—	—	—	Atlanta Braves	
2026	IL	76–73	.510	10th	5th	6 1/2	—	—	—	Atlanta Braves	
Totals	—	350–395	.470	—	—	—	—	—	—	—	—

== Logos and uniforms ==
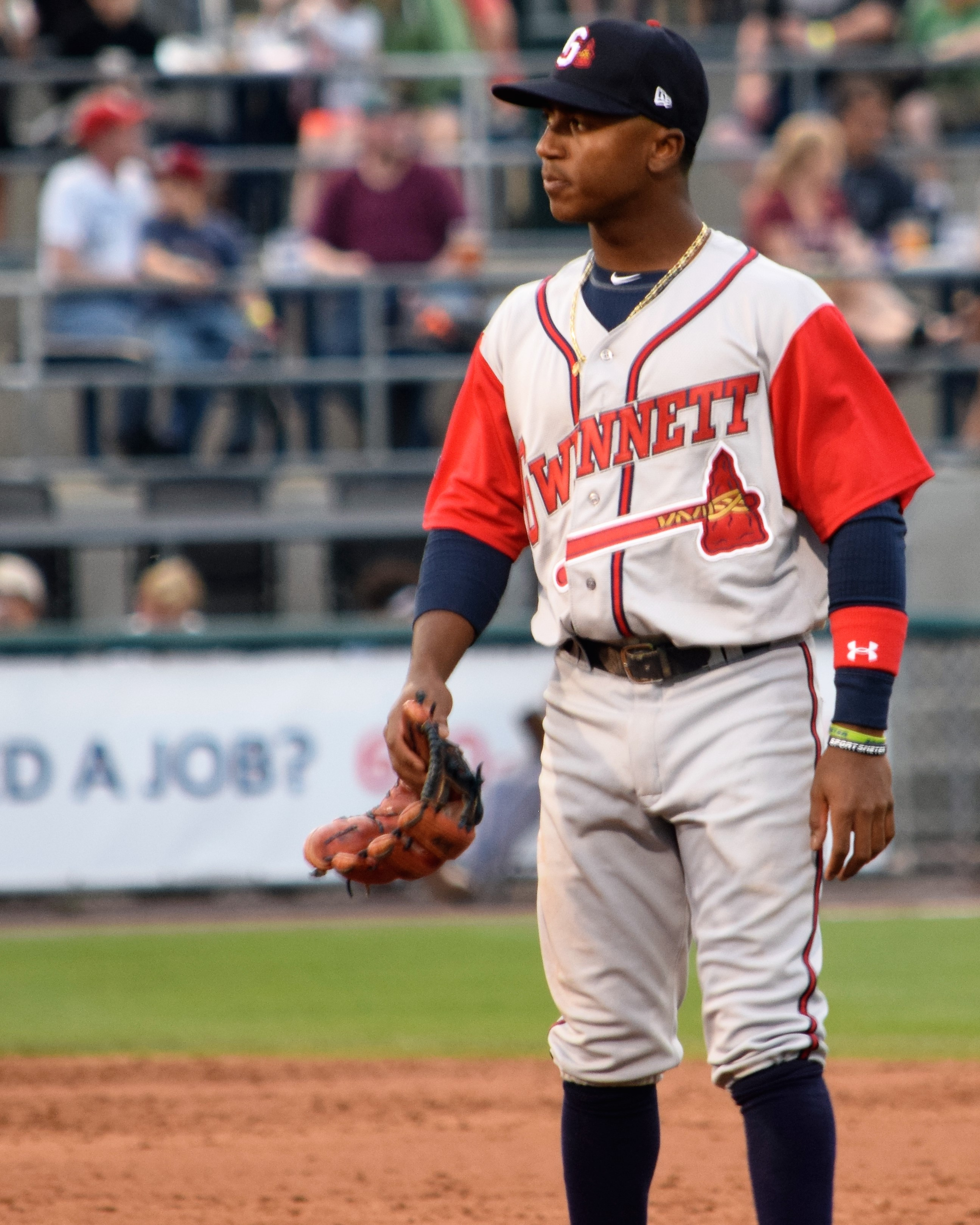
Ozzie Albies in a Gwinnett Braves road uniform in 2016.

From 2009 to 2017, the colors of the Gwinnett Braves were navy blue and red, the same as their Atlanta parent. The primary logo resembled the Atlanta Braves' primary logo, but with a silver outline and "Gwinnett" centered above. The home jersey had the classic Braves' wordmark centered on the front, with the "Gwinnett" underscore underlining it. However, unlike Atlanta's jersey with navy blue and red piping, Gwinnett's jersey featured red sleeves with blue stripes.

Along with the Braves' 2018 rebrand as the Stripers, the team adopted new colors and logos. Their primary colors became dark blue and sea green, with red retained as an accent color. The new logos feature a green striped bass.

== Radio and television ==
From the inaugural 2009 season through 2019, Tony Schiavone, former voice of the Atlanta Braves, Charlotte Knights, World Championship Wrestling, and World Wrestling Entertainment, was the play-by-play announcer. Dave Lezotte has been the lead broadcaster since the beginning of the 2021 season.

All Stripers home and road broadcasts are broadcast on My Country 99.3 WCON-FM. Live audio broadcasts are also available online through the station's website as well as on the team's website and the MiLB First Pitch app. Games can be viewed through the MiLB.TV subscription feature of the official website of Minor League Baseball, with audio provided by a radio simulcast.

== Roster ==
Gwinnett Stripers roster
Players	Coaches/Other
Pitchers: 52 Garrett Baumann; 58 Blake Burkhalter *; 48 Cedric De Grandpre; 60 Bailey Falter *; 26 Michael Grove *; 71 Drue Hackenberg; 63 Ian Hamilton; 57 Elieser Hernandez *; 64 Herick Hernandez; 43 Joe Jimenez * #; 22 James Karinchak *; 40 Reynaldo Lopez * #; 45 Rolddy Muñoz *; 54 Joel Payamps; 34 Anderson Pilar ~; 99 Davis Polo; 64 Brett Sears ~; 46 Tyler Uberstine *; 62 Ricky Vanasco *; 66 Luis Vargas; 33 Danny Young *; Catchers: 27 Jair Camargo; 2 Maverick Handley; 19 Sean Murphy * #; 32 Adam Zebrowski; Infielders: 14 Cal Conley; 8 Lizandro Espinoza; 11 Jordan Groshans; 1 Jim Jarvis *; 24 David McCabe; 52 Rowdy Tellez; 5 Luke Williams; 0 Brett Wisely; Outfielders: 38 Jose Azocar; 61 Patrick Clohisy; 13 Kevin Kilpatrick Jr. ~; Designated hitters: 39 Sandy Leon	Manager: 50 Kanekoa Texeira; Coaches: 52 Craig Bjornson (bullpen); 38 Lance Carter (pitching); 53 Tyler Dalton (pitching); 9 Dan DeMent (hitting); 17 Angel Flores (coach); 30 Ruben Gotay (coach); 60-day injured list: 26 Hurston Waldrep * (full season); 7-day injured list; * On Atlanta Braves 40-man roster; ~ Development list; # Rehab assignment; ∞ Reserve list; ‡ Restricted list; § Suspended list; † Temporarily inactive list; Roster updated September 17, 2026; Transactions; → More rosters: MiLB • International League; → Atlanta Braves minor league players

== Achievements ==
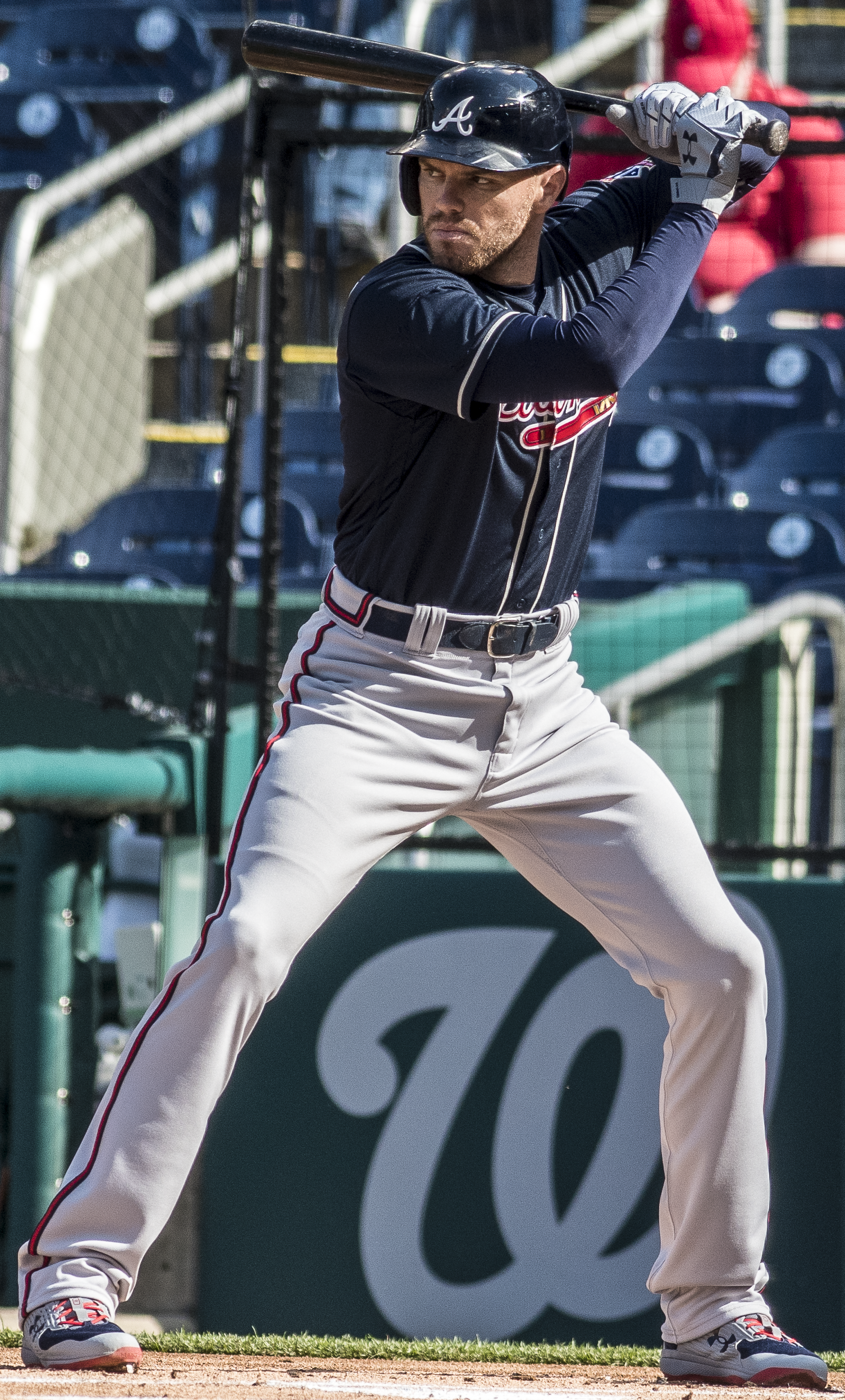
Freddie Freeman won the International League Rookie of the Year Award in 2010.

=== Retired numbers ===
The Stripers have not honored any players from their franchise history in Gwinnett by retiring their uniform numbers. When a number is retired, only the player with the retired number can wear that number if he returns to that team as a player or coach. This ensures that the number will be associated with one player of particular importance to the team. However, they have honored former Richmond Braves player and manager Tommie Aaron, brother of Hank Aaron, by retiring his number 23 on April 12, 2012. Additionally, Jackie Robinson's number 42 was retired throughout professional baseball on April 15, 1997.

=== Awards ===
Three players and one manager won International League awards in recognition for their performance with Gwinnett.

Award	Recipient	Season	Ref.
Most Valuable Pitcher	Julio Teherán	2011	
Rookie of the Year	Freddie Freeman	2010	
Rookie of the Year	Julio Teherán	2011	
Rookie of the Year	Ernesto Mejía	2012	
Manager of the Year	Damon Berryhill	2019	

== Managers ==
Gwinnett has had eight managers since their inaugural 2009 season.

Manager	Season(s)
Dave Brundage	2009–2012
Randy Ready	2013
Brian Snitker	2014–2016
Rick Albert*	2016
John Moses*	2016
Damon Berryhill	2017–2020
Matt Tuiasosopo	2021–2023
Kanekoa Texeira	2024–present
* Interim manager
