= WMSL =

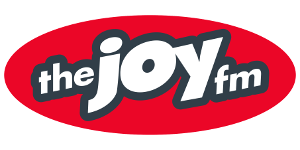
- Bogart, Georgia; United States
- Broadcast area: Athens–Northeast Georgia
- Frequency: 88.9 MHz (HD Radio)

Programming
- Format: Contemporary Christian
- Subchannels: HD2: Christian worship
- Network: The Joy FM

Ownership
- Owner: Radio Training Network; (Radio Training Network, Inc.)

History
- First air date: December 1987
- Former call signs: WPBS (April–September 1987)

Technical information
- Licensing authority: FCC
- Facility ID: 53562
- Class: C3
- ERP: 20,000 watts
- HAAT: 91.0 meters
- Transmitter coordinates: 33°54′25.00″N 83°29′35.00″W

Links
- Public license information: Public file; LMS
- Webcast: Listen Live
- Website: thejoyfm.com

WMSL (88.9 FM) is an American Christian radio station broadcasting a Contemporary Christian music format. Licensed to Bogart, Georgia, the station serves the Athens–Northeast Georgia area. The station, originally owned by Prince Avenue Baptist Church and Christian School in Athens (via "Prince Educational Media"), currently is owned by the Radio Training Network.

== History ==
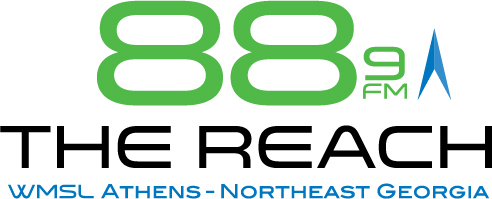
Logo from 2016 until 2019

The station was assigned the call letters WPBS on April 1, 1987, but on September 15, 1987, the call sign was changed to the current WMSL. The station began broadcasting in December 1987.

In 1988, WMSL adopted a music format developed by Jim Hutto, formerly the operations manager at Atlanta easy-listening radio station WPCH. The "Masterful Music" format, modeled on WPCH's long-running Sunday morning "Sounds of Faith" program, featured instrumental recordings of hymns, sacred music, and praise-and-worship songs, as well as traditional and contemporary pieces performed by choral groups and soloists.

The station programmed music more than 22 hours per day, with brief breaks for news and short features.

In January 2014, WMSL adopted a "Contemporary Christian" format with music from syndicator Christian FM. Two years later, the station dropped the "Great 88" identifier and changed to "The Reach."

In 2019, "The Reach" gave way to "The Joy FM" following WMSL's sale to the Radio Training Network.

== See also ==
- WVFJ-FM — 93.3 FM, licensed to Greenville, Georgia
