= WXKG =

Simulcasts WYKG Covington
- Atlanta, Georgia; United States
- Broadcast area: Atlanta metropolitan area
- Frequency: 1010 kHz
- Branding: 105.5 The King

Programming
- Format: Urban and Inspirational

Ownership
- Owner: Danny Wilson; (Light Media Holdings, Inc.)
- Sister stations: WYKG

History
- First air date: July 15, 1947
- Former call signs: WEAS (1947–1959); WGUN (1959–2013); WTZA (2013–2023)
- Call sign meaning: King

Technical information
- Licensing authority: FCC
- Facility ID: 72134
- Class: D
- Power: 50,000 watts (day); 45,000 watts (critical hours); 78 watts (night); 26 watts (PSRA); 24–26 watts (PSSA)
- Transmitter coordinates: 33.698605°N 84.289421°W

Links
- Public license information: Public file; LMS
- Webcast: Listen Live
- Website: 105theking.com

WXKG (1010 AM) is a commercial radio station in Atlanta, Georgia, known as "105.5 The King". It is owned by Danny Wilson, through licensee Light Media Holdings, Inc., and airs an urban and inspirational format.

In the daytime, WXKG has the maximum power for AM stations in the U.S., 50,000 watts. But because AM 1010 is a Canadian clear channel frequency, WXKG must reduce power at night when radio waves travel farther. During critical hours, the power is 45,000 watts and at night, it broadcasts at 78 watts. It uses a non-directional antenna at all times, located off Battle Forrest Drive in Decatur, near Interstate 285. WXKG is classified as a class D AM broadcast station according to the Federal Communications Commission.

== History ==
=== WEAS ===
The station originally signed on July 15, 1947 with the call sign WEAS and was licensed to serve nearby Decatur, Georgia. The station was founded by Eurith Dickenson ("Dee") Rivers Jr., son of former governor of Georgia E.D. "Ed" Rivers. The WEAS call sign stood for Emory University & Agnes Scott College, both of which are located in Decatur. WEAS' format grew into a combination of country and western music, southern gospel music and preaching.

In 1959, the station changed its call sign to WGUN It had a country music format with the station adopting "the big GUN" slogan. The WEAS call sign went to the Dee Rivers station at 900 MHz in Savannah, Georgia.

=== WTZA ===
On January 25, 2013, the station changed its call sign to WTZA. On January 31, 2013, after a brief simulcast with W233BF "Streetz 94.5", it changed its format to urban oldies, branded as "Old School 1010".

Again after a simulcast of 94.5 (legally, WSTR FM 94.1 HD3), broadcast translator station W257DF on 99.3 switched to simulcasting WTZA at the end of summer 2014, upon making its most recent move toward metro Atlanta. However, since W257DF was only recently authorized by the FCC, it is illegal for it to rebroadcast anything other than another FM station's analog signal. The city of license for this station is Dallas, Georgia, although it has never actually had that city within its broadcast range. It transmits at 99 watts instead of 250, to protect WRAS FM 88.5, which overlaps its 10.7 MHz intermediate frequency centered on 88.6.

Originally applied-for during the 2003 window, the first location northwest of Villa Rica was approved in December 2013 at the full 250 watts. Just a few days later, it applied for a construction permit to move east toward Atlanta, to a point along U.S. 78 (Veterans Memorial Parkway) west of Douglasville. Upon submitting the application for the broadcast license to cover that 130-watt permit, it again applied almost immediately to move east again to Mableton, still keeping Dallas as its supposed city of license, despite being even further away from there than the first two locations. Like other translator stations, it is trying to make small "skips" toward the city (and its primary demographic) through a series of "minor modifications". The change of W256BO on 99.1 to W255CJ on 98.9 was also required to allow for this.

In 2014, WTZA split from the simulcast with W257DF and flipped to Spanish Christian Contemporary music as "Vida 1010."

In late 2015, W257DF was forced off the air by the upgrade of co-channel WCON-FM 99.3 northeast of Atlanta. WTZA began simulcasting on translator W227DN on 93.3 MHz.

On February 3, 2020, R.C. Media Partners assumed management of WTZA, with a talk format consisting of Kim "The Kimmer" Peterson, Kara Stockton, Pete Davis, Mike Brooks, Jim Gossett, Will Regan and "Flat Earth" Jamie Chapman. The station went silent on March 27, 2020.

Effective October 14, 2020, station owners K & Z Broadcasting, LLC sold the station to Radio Spice, LLC for $300,000. It returned to the air in the fall of 2020, airing a South Asian format of music and talk. Effective May 4, 2023, Radio Spice sold WTZA to Danny Wilson's Light Media Holdings, Inc. for $75,000. The station filed an application to change its call sign to WXKG, which took effect May 23, 2023.
