= WTJH =

Radio station in East Point, Georgia (1950–2009)

Coordinates: 33°41′47″N 84°28′29″W

East Point, Georgia; United States
- Broadcast area: Atlanta metropolitan area
- Frequency: 1260 kHz

Programming
- Format: Defunct (formerly gospel music)

Ownership
- Owner: Willis Broadcasting Company

History
- First air date: 1950
- Last air date: November 29, 2009
- Call sign meaning: We're The Joy House

Technical information
- Class: D
- Power: 5,000 watts daytime; 39 watts nighttime

WTJH was an AM broadcasting station licensed to the city of East Point, Georgia, United States, broadcasting on the frequency of 1260 kHz with 5,000 watts of power during daytime hours, and 39 watts of power during nighttime hours with a non-directional antenna pattern. The station served the Atlanta radio market. WTJH's programming consisted of gospel music and Christian religious programs.

WTJH was owned by (Bishop) Levi E. Willis Sr. through Willis Broadcasting Company with license holder Christian Broadcasting of East Point, Inc. In 2004, WTJH's owner Levi E. Willis Sr. and Willis Broadcasting had been in violation of a number of technical and public safety rules enforced by the Federal Communications Commission. The dispute was eventually settled in 2004 through sale of property held by the company.

In December 2009 and again in March 2010, the station filed letters and applications to the Federal Communications Commission (FCC) for the station to go silent. The FCC approved the request but the station was required to come back on the air by November 30, 2010, or the broadcast license would be revoked. On July 24, 2014, the FCC notified the owners that the station's license was deemed to be expired as of November 29, 2010, due to the station being remaining silent for well in excess of twelve months.
