= WMLB (Cumming, Georgia) =

Radio station in Cumming, Georgia (1961–2003)

Cumming, Georgia; United States
- Frequency: 1170 kHz

Ownership
- Owner: Corey Broadcast Group, Inc.

History
- First air date: October 13, 1961; 64 years ago
- Last air date: July 2003; 22 years ago
- Former call signs: WSNE (1961–1980); WHNE (1980–1993); WMLB (1993–2002); WMLE (2002–2003)
- Former frequencies: 1410 kHz (1961–1970)
- Call sign meaning: Mountains Lake Broadcasting

Technical information
- Facility ID: 36530
- Power: 5,000 watts day 2,500 watts critical hours
- Transmitter coordinates: 34°10′41.14″N 84°9′21.31″W

WMLB was a radio station broadcasting on 1170 kHz in Cumming, Georgia, United States, from 1961 to 2003. It was last owned by Corey Broadcast Group, Inc.

== History ==
On May 10, 1961, Sawnee Broadcasting Company, a corporation owned by John T. Pittard, received a construction permit from the Federal Communications Commission to build a new radio station in Cumming, to broadcast with 1,000 watts during the day on 1410 kHz. The station began broadcasting as WSNE, or West, South, North n' East per the original owner on October 13, 1961. In 1968, Pittard sold WSNE to Howard Rowe and Associates, Inc. That same year, the station filed to move to 1170 kHz; the change, approved two years later, kept the station daytime-only, but it was able to switch from a directional to a nondirectional antenna pattern on the new frequency.

Howard Rowe, who owned WSNE and WDGL in Douglasville, died in 1978. Two years later, the call letters were changed from WSNE to WHNE to honor Howard and his wife Evelyn ("Howard 'n' Evelyn"). Airing a primarily Southern Gospel format, WHNE was approved to increase its power to 5,000 watts in December 1987.

When I first got it, it was just very unprofessional. They were having screaming preachers on at 8 o'clock in the morning, during morning drive time. It was bizarre.

— Amy Rives McCollum

In 1989, Howard Rowe and Associates sold WHNE to Lanier Broadcasting, Inc., run by Amy Rives McCollum, in a $225,000 transaction. McCollum shifted the station's programming from gospel to country. Two years later, a controversy erupted at WHNE. In October 1991, two employees of the station called a news conference to go public with allegations that they had been pressured to favor the Cumming city council and mayor in their reporting, prompting the resignation of the news director and public service director and leading the mayor to reveal that he had business dealings with owner Rives McCollum as part of a real estate company.

The call letters were changed to WMLB in 1993. By this time, the station was known as "Mountains Lake Radio", airing a primarily news/talk format with an evening block of gospel music, as well as other typical features including a tradio program and Sunday church services.

=== Americana years ===
In 1994, Chris Marino, a man who had never been inside a radio studio until he stopped by to ask to host a talk show on WMLB, became the program director and morning host. Under Marino's stewardship, WMLB changed to an Americana music format, retaining the longstanding local features that had been associated with the station; the new format made the station profitable for the first time since McCollum bought it in 1989. The change in direction was not only earning money but also national prestige: the Gavin Report crowned WMLB Americana station of the year in 1997.

Marino left in late 1997, but that did not slow WMLB down. Led by Station Managers Dave Stone, then Jim Dean and Music Director Nancy Foster Johnson, the station was rated four times as Atlanta's best country radio station by Creative Loafing magazine, an achievement considering that it was going up against the five Atlanta-area stations in the actual country format.

=== "The Twins" ===
On April 2, 2001, the Americana music abruptly stopped—to the surprise of even WMLB's program director—after Corey Broadcast Group, who also owned WKGE (1160 AM), acquired the station and dropped both stations' existing formats, as well as all of the Cumming station's local service features, for a simulcast as oldies stations "The Twins". While the new oldies format had a deep 9,000-song library, the loss of the Americana format brought disappointment from loyal listeners as well as questions of why the simulcast did not adopt WMLB's prior programming. Corey had paid $750,000 for the station, though he did not acquire the transmitter site land.

Corey's acquisition of WMLB also came with another motivating factor. His station at 1160 kHz, licensed to East Point, held a construction permit to increase daytime power from 10,000 to 50,000 watts, but it could not make the move without shutting down or reducing the power of the Cumming transmitter. The WMLB call letters moved from 1170 to 1160 in February 2002 (with 1170 becoming WMLE), and the power increase took effect in July 2003. As a direct result, WMLE signed off the air for good.
