= WGM (radio station) =

Radio station in Atlanta, Georgia, United States (1922–1923)

WGM was an AM radio broadcasting station in Atlanta, Georgia, operated by the Atlanta Constitution newspaper from March 1922 to July 1923. Although the station gained national prominence, it was shut down by its owner after just over a year of operation. The station equipment was then donated to Georgia Tech, where it was used in early 1924 to help set up radio station WBBF.

== History ==
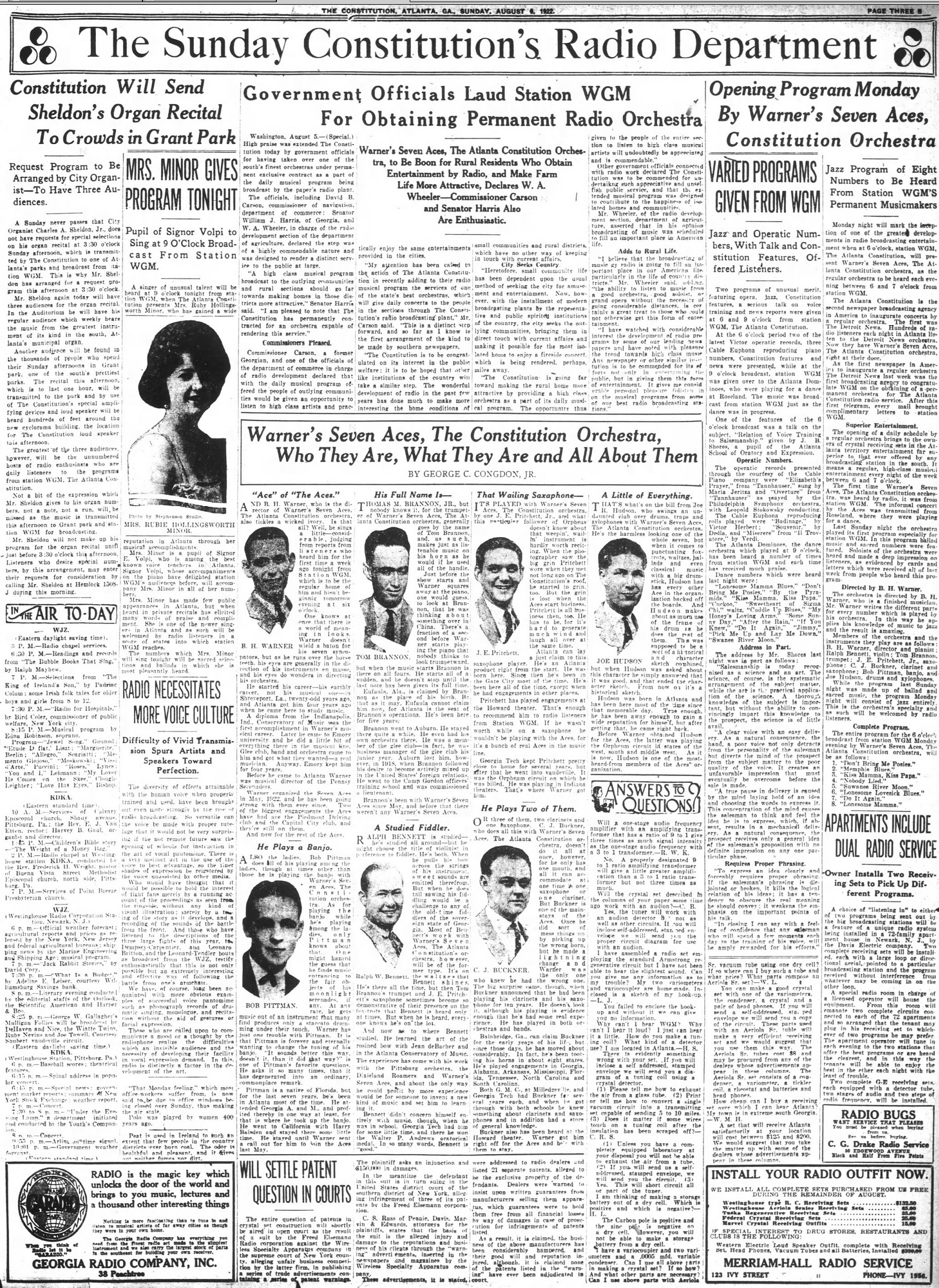
The Constitution's weekly "Radio Department" page provided extensive coverage of WGM activities (August 1922)

In early 1922 there was growing interest by the general public about the introduction of radio broadcasting. On December 1, 1921, the U.S. Department of Commerce, which regulated radio at this time, adopted a regulation formally establishing a broadcasting station category, which set aside the wavelength of 360 meters (833 kHz) for entertainment broadcasts, and 485 meters (619 kHz) for market and weather reports. By the end of the year there were over 500 authorized stations in the United States.

In many communities there was competition to be the first to start a station. In Atlanta both of the two major newspapers, the Journal and the Constitution, began plans to establish stations. (Note: The Journal was an afternoon newspaper, while the Constitution published in the morning. The two papers came under common ownership in 1950, and were merged into the Atlanta Journal-Constitution in 2001.) The Journal would be first to get a station on the air, inaugurating WSB on March 15, 1922. Two days later, on March 17, the Constitution received its own telegraphed authorization for a broadcasting station, with the randomly assigned call letters WGM, valid for transmitting on both wavelengths. The paper's review of the potential benefits of the new service was enthusiastic: "Although radio news service is still in its infancy, there is every evidence that it is only a question of a very few months when it will be considered as an imperatively necessary source of information." and "It is not a fad. It is an industrial revolution."

WGM's debut broadcast began at 7:00 p.m. that evening. Because the newspaper had not yet procured a radio transmitter, the broadcast was made using a transmitter located at the Georgia Railway and Power Company, that it had been using for its own amateur station, 4FT. The newspaper announced that broadcasts from WGM were planned to be conducted nightly, from 7 to 7:30 p.m. and 9 to 9:30 p.m. In addition, the paper predicted that "it is believed that in a very few months there will not be a southern community that will not be hanging on the radio telephone to a man, woman and child during the hours The Constitution is broadcasting".

Because WSB was also transmitting on 360 meters, the two newspapers had to establish a time sharing agreement allocating broadcast hours. Competition was so fierce between the two that WSB's manager, Lambdin "The Little Colonel" Kay, banned any person who had previously appeared on WGM from broadcasting over WSB.

WGM's use of the Georgia Railway and Power transmitter came to an end in late May, when the power company received its own broadcasting station authorization, as WDAW. The newspaper announced that WGM was suspending operations until a new transmitting facility could be constructed. In early July WGM resumed operations from its "radio plant" atop the Constitution building. (During this pause WGM's license was temporarily deleted, then reinstated, with the same call letters and owner.)

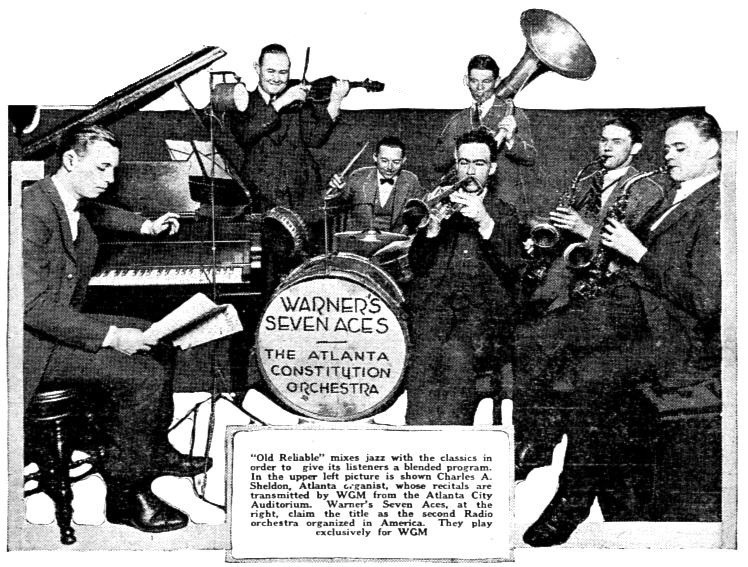
"Warner's Seven Aces" performing at WGM

In September 1922 the Department of Commerce set aside a second entertainment wavelength, 400 meters (750 kHz) for "Class B" stations that had quality equipment and programming. Both WSB and WGM were assigned to this new wavelength, with WGM introducing the use of its new home-built 500-watt transmitter. In May 1923 additional "Class B" frequencies were made available, with Atlanta allocated 700 kHz, (Note: Beginning with these assignments radio stations ended the practice of broadcasting their market reports and weather forecasts on the separate 485 meter wavelength.) and WSB and WGM were reassigned to this new shared frequency. That summer WGM's schedule was reported to be 7 to 8 p.m. and 10:30 to 12:30 p.m. Eastern Time daily except on Wednesdays, which was Atlanta's "silent night" when stations in the area remained off the air in order to aid listeners attempting to pick up weak distant signals.

Although WGM was a high-powered station providing extensive and varied programming, on July 22, 1923, a front page Constitution headline announced that the station would be shutting down at the end of the month, with the station's assets to be contributed to Georgia Tech, so that the college could establish its own station. WGM made its final broadcast on the evening of July 29, 1923. The Commerce Department officially deleted the station's license effective August 28, 1923.

Financed largely through the Constitution's donation, the new Georgia Tech station, WBBF (later WGST, now WGKA) began operating in early January 1924. (Note: Although much of the equipment used by WBBF had been inherited from WGM, the Department of Commerce treated WGM and WBBF as separate stations, and Federal Communications Commission records list January 7, 1924, as WGKA's "first license date".) During the station's debut broadcast on January 14, college president M. L. Brittain's opening speech lauded "the generosity of Editor Clark Howell and The Constitution", with the newspaper reporting that Brittain also had "expressed the gratitude of the institution to The Constitution for presenting without cost to Tech the powerful broadcasting equipment".

== See also ==
- List of initial AM-band station grants in the United States
