= WLTA =

Christian talk radio station in Alpharetta, Georgia

Simulcast of WNIV, Atlanta
- Alpharetta, Georgia; United States
- Broadcast area: Atlanta metropolitan area
- Frequency: 1400 kHz
- Branding: Faith Talk 970

Programming
- Format: Christian radio
- Affiliations: Salem Radio Network

Ownership
- Owner: Salem Media Group; (Salem Communications Holding Corporation)
- Sister stations: WDWD; WGKA; WNIV

History
- First air date: August 25, 1986

Technical information
- Licensing authority: FCC
- Facility ID: 42660
- Class: C
- Power: 1,000 watts (unlimited)
- Transmitter coordinates: 34.064581°N 84.280436°W

Links
- Public license information: Public file; LMS
- Webcast: Listen live; Listen live (via Audacy); Listen live (via iHeartRadio)
- Website: faithtalk970.com

WLTA (1400 AM) is a commercial Christian radio station licensed to Alpharetta, Georgia, United States, and serving the Atlanta metropolitan area. It is owned by Salem Communications along with WNIV in Atlanta; WLTA is a full-time simulcast of WNIV's Christian talk and teaching programming. WLTA's transmitter is located on Northwinds Parkway near U.S. Route 19 in Alpharetta.

The station mainly serves to fill in the gaps in WNIV's nighttime coverage. WNIV must reduce its power to 39 watts at sunset, rendering it all but unlistenable even in Atlanta.

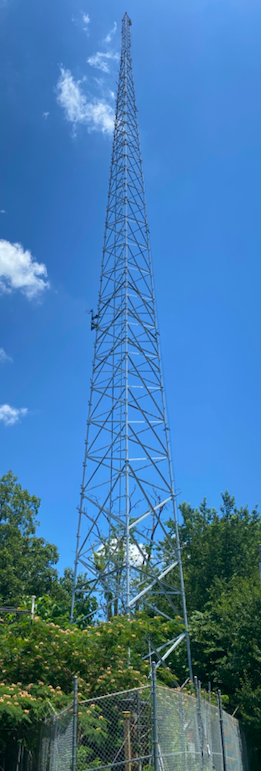
WLTA's broadcast antenna

== History ==
The station first signed on the air on August 25, 1986.
