= WCON (AM) =

- Cornelia, Georgia; United States
- Frequency: 1450 kHz
- Branding: 107.7 The Breeze

Programming
- Format: Soft AC

Ownership
- Owner: Habersham Broadcasting Company
- Sister stations: WCON-FM

History
- First air date: March 28, 1953
- Call sign meaning: Cornelia

Technical information
- Licensing authority: FCC
- Facility ID: 25813
- Class: C
- Power: 1,000 watts unlimited
- Transmitter coordinates: 34°30′57.00″N 83°32′20.00″W
- Translator: 107.7 W299AT (Cornelia)

Links
- Public license information: Public file; LMS
- Webcast: Listen Live
- Website: 1077thebreeze.com

WCON (1450 kHz) is an AM radio station broadcasting a soft adult contemporary format. Licensed to Cornelia, Georgia, United States, the station is currently owned by Habersham Broadcasting Company.
