= WVFJ-FM =

- Greenville, Georgia; United States
- Broadcast area: Mid-Western Georgia
- Frequency: 93.3 MHz (HD Radio)
- Branding: 93.3 & 102.1 The Joy FM

Programming
- Format: Contemporary Christian
- Subchannels: HD2: Contemporary worship music; HD3: Christian hip hop

Ownership
- Owner: Radio Training Network

History
- First air date: 1967
- Former call signs: WFDR-FM (1967–1981); WQCK (1981–1983)
- Call sign meaning: "Victory For Jesus"

Technical information
- Licensing authority: FCC
- Facility ID: 53679
- Class: C0
- ERP: 38,000 watts; 57,000 watts (CP)
- HAAT: 491 meters (1,611 ft)
- Transmitter coordinates: 33°5′10.4″N 84°46′9.7″W
- Translator: See § Translators
- Repeater: See § Repeaters

Links
- Public license information: Public file; LMS
- Webcast: Listen live
- Website: georgia.thejoyfm.com

WVFJ-FM (93.3 FM, "The JOY FM") is a non-commercial radio station licensed to Greenville, Georgia, United States, and serving West-Central Georgia, including portions of Metro Atlanta and the Columbus-Auburn-Opelika area. Owned by the Radio Training Network with studios and offices in Tyrone, WVFJ broadcasts a Contemporary Christian format. Its tower is located in Greenville, off Forest Road. The station broadcasts online and on a network of rebroadcasters and FM translators.

== History ==
=== WFDR-FM and WQCK ===
The station's original call sign was WFDR-FM, signing on the air in 1967. It was the sister station to WFDR AM 1370 in Manchester. The call sign was a reference to former U.S. President Franklin D. Roosevelt, who had his Little White House vacation home in nearby Warm Springs, Georgia.

On October 31, 1981, the station changed its call sign to WQCK. Two years later, it adopted its current call letters of WVFJ-FM on July 7, 1983.

=== Christian radio ===
On February 13, 1981, Atlanta businessman Bill Watkins and his wife Joyce founded Provident Broadcasting Company in order to create a radio ministry for the benefit of Christians and others seeking spiritual inspiration. WVFJ, which began using the moniker "The JOY FM", was their first station. It operated as a commercial radio station, selling advertising to support its operations. In 1998, it moved its radio studios from the small community of Manchester into Atlanta radio market as Metro Atlanta's first Contemporary Christian station. The transmitter was moved closer to Atlanta to Greenville.

Provident Broadcasting Company was a wholly owned subsidiary of Watkins Associated Industries, Incorporated. The group's stated mission was to provide wholesome family programming filled with joy, hope, and encouragement.

In March 2011, WVFJ became officially owned by Radio Training Network. One of the changes under new ownership was that after 30 years, WVFJ became a non-commercial, listener-supported station instead of selling advertising. In May, WVFJ added 11,000 watts to its effective radiated power.

WVFJ-FM is in a three-way competition for the Christian Contemporary audience in the Atlanta market. Tennessee-based Educational Media Foundation owns both of WVFJ's competitors: 106.7 WAKL, part of the non-commercial K-Love network, and 104.7 WAIA, which broadcasts the company's other Christian Contemporary network Air1.

=== Tower collapse ===
On January 12, 2023, WVFJ's transmitter tower was destroyed by a tornado. A series of tornados in Georgia and Alabama resulted in seven fatalities and caused millions of dollars in damage.

Radio Training Network worked to restore the tower and get the station back on the air. While the tower was reconstructed, programming continues to be heard on line and on a series of rebroadcasters and FM translators in Georgia and Alabama.

In May 2024, construction of the new tower was completed at the same location as the previous tower, and the station returned to broadcast at full power.

=== Translator network ===
The station is retransmitted on W270AS 101.9 in Carrollton to the northwest and W231AO 94.1 in Columbus, all located southwest of Atlanta in Western Georgia. It is also listed as the primary station for multiple other translator applications filed by Edgewater Broadcasting in 2003, in what was called the "Great Translator Invasion".

All of its translators are in Western Georgia and Eastern Alabama. Two translators rebroadcast WVFJ's HD Radio digital subchannels, one airing Contemporary worship music and one airing Christian hip hop.

== Repeaters ==
Call sign	Frequency	City of license	FID	ERP (W)	HAAT	Class	Transmitter coordinates	FCC info
WWWD	102.1 FM	Bolingbroke, Georgia	86172	4,500	115 m (377 ft)	A	32°54′30.5″N 83°46′36.7″W	LMS
WLKQ-HD2	(102.3-2) FM	Buford, Georgia	36350	4,200	119 m (390 ft)	A	34°7′16.4″N 83°58′34.7″W	LMS
WCON-HD2	(99.3-2) FM	Cornelia, Georgia	25814	100,000	246 m (807 ft)	C1	34°31′24.4″N 83°40′45.6″W	LMS

== Translators ==
Call sign	Frequency	City of license	FID	ERP (W)	HAAT	Class	FCC info	Notes
W271CF	102.1 FM	Phenix City, Alabama	151095	210	117 m (384 ft)	D	LMS	Relays WVFJ-FM
W262AL	100.3 FM	Gainesville, Georgia	151815	105	128 m (420 ft)	D	LMS	Relays WCON-HD2
W223CQ	92.5 FM	Lawrenceville, Georgia	67214	250	60 m (197 ft)	D	LMS	Relays WLKQ-HD2

Broadcast translator for WVFJ-HD2
Call sign	Frequency	City of license	FID	ERP (W)	HAAT	Class	FCC info
W270AS	101.9 FM	Carrollton, Georgia	150826	10	177.1 m (581 ft)	D	LMS

Broadcast translator for WVFJ-HD3
Call sign	Frequency	City of license	FID	ERP (W)	HAAT	Class	FCC info
W292GF	106.3 FM	Morrow, Georgia	153974	5	133.6 m (438 ft)	D	LMS

== See also ==
- WMSL — 88.9 FM, licensed to Bogart, Georgia

== Notable DJ ==
- Rob Redding
