= Jonathan Phelps =

William Jonathan Phelps (May 4, 1928 - July 21, 2011), known as Jonathan Phelps, was a radio announcer on Atlanta, Georgia's classical music stations WGKA-FM and WABE-FM. Born in Tennessee, he moved to Atlanta in 1937, where he began as an announcer on WGKA-FM in 1956. He stayed with that station until it was sold in 1971 and its programming format changed, whereupon he went to WABE-FM, eventually became program director, and stayed with that station until his retirement in 1991. Known locally for his rich voice, he was also a Shakespearean actor and a part-time ballet dancer, having performed some roles with the Atlanta Ballet. On radio, he spoke without a trace of his native Tennessee accent, or indeed, any kind of Southern accent.

Phelps died at the age of 83 from emphysema, on July 21, 2011.
