= WNIV =

- Atlanta, Georgia; United States
- Broadcast area: Atlanta metropolitan area
- Frequency: 970 kHz
- Branding: Faith Talk 970

Programming
- Format: Christian radio
- Affiliations: Salem Radio Network

Ownership
- Owner: Salem Media Group; (Salem Communications Holding Corporation)
- Sister stations: WDWD; WGKA; WLTA

History
- First air date: 1949
- Former call signs: WGLS; WTAM; WIIN; WKLS

Technical information
- Licensing authority: FCC
- Facility ID: 23607
- Class: D
- Power: 5,000 watts (day); 39 watts (night)
- Transmitter coordinates: 33.809444°N 84.353889°W

Links
- Public license information: Public file; LMS
- Webcast: Listen live; Listen live (via Audacy); Listen live (via iHeartRadio)
- Website: faithtalk970.com

WNIV (970 AM) is a commercial Christian radio station licensed to Atlanta, Georgia, United States. It is one of three Salem Media Group-owned stations in the Atlanta metropolitan area carrying a Christian format: WDWD carries a different schedule of national and local religious leaders, while WLTA in Alpharetta, Georgia, simulcasts WNIV's programming for Atlanta's northern suburbs.

WNIV's transmitting tower is shared by WAFS (previously under common ownership) using an antenna diplexing system. The Federal Communications Commission considers WNIV to be a Class D AM facility.

== Programming ==
WNIV and WLTA air national and local religious leaders, including David Jeremiah, Jim Daly, Alistair Begg, Charles Stanley and Chuck Swindoll. Many of the same shows are also heard on co-owned FaithTalk 590 WDWD, but at different times. Salem sells blocks of brokered programming time to hosts, who in turn, may appeal for donations to the radio ministries. SRN News begins some hours of the day.

== History ==
The station first signed on in Decatur in 1949 with the original call sign WGLS. It was owned by the DeKalb Broadcasting Company and a 1,000-watt daytimer, required to go off the air at night.

It later picked up the call sign WTAM when the Cleveland station that had used those call letters changed to KYW. In the 1960s, it changed to WIIN.

In 1968, WIIN flipped to a Top 40 format. During the early 1970s WIIN changed format to progressive rock under new local owner Blake Hawkins. WIIN was, for a while, Atlanta's only progressive rock station and quickly became known for introducing new rock music to the Atlanta market. Under Program Directors John Parker and Brent Alberts, WIIN featured morning talent Skinny Bobby Harper who was consistently in the top 5 in Atlanta morning ratings. WIIN became an adult standards/easy listening station in the late 1970s.

In the early 1980s, the station changed its call letters to WKLS and format to album rock, as a simulcast of 96.1 WKLS-FM (now WWPW). The simulcast lasted until 1988 when the station was sold. The new owner, Salem Communications, changed the call letters to the current WNIV. The station adopted Christian talk and teaching programming.

Former Georgia Congressman Pat Swindall hosted a daily talk show on WNIV for several years, after serving a federal prison sentence.
