= Barbershop Digest =

- Cover of the July issue Barbershop Digest
- Type: Monthly magazine
- Format: Tabloid
- Owner(s): Rock Point Communications
- Publisher: Rock Point Communications
- Editor: Brian Egeston
- Founded: 2008
- Language: English
- Headquarters: Atlanta, GA 30303; United States
- Circulation: 20,000
- Price: Free
- Website: barbershopdigest.com

Barbershop Digest is a full-color narrowcast niche publication, reaching African-American men across a diverse section of demographics. Revealing, entertaining and thought provoking, Barbershop Digest is a publication on the pulse of African-American men.

Barbershop Digest is the only magazine with a focus on the culture that encompasses African-American men. If the subject is discussed in the culture of the barbershop, the magazine covers it with edgy provocative content and stunning visual images.

Barbershop Digest is slated to have a one-year test run in Atlanta before making a regional launch in the Southeast followed soon after by a national campaign.

== History ==
=== Origins ===
Barbershop Digest is the brainchild of editor-in-chef Brian Egeston. Egeston produces the monthly publication along with his co-worker, neighbor and creative director Travis Hudgons. College friend Angus Wilson is the magazine's business manager and Donna Turner serves as the marketing manager and copy editor Andy Phelan.

"[Martin Luther] King hustled for nonviolence. [Barack] Obama is out there hustling for change," he told readers in a recent issue.

"And here we are at Barbershop Digest hustling for you, to give you a product that is motivation and inspiration for you to hustle. ... It's not about us, it really is about the kat cutting heads all day and the guy who's worked all day and just needs to relax in the barber's chair and get his batteries recharged with a fresh fade. It's about the dude pushing his items so that somebody can eat or go to college. We've all got to find our motivation to hustle."

== Circulation and Distribution ==
Barbershop Digest distributes an average of 20,000 copies throughout the metro Atlanta area and reaching an estimated 85,000 readers.
