= WYZE (AM) =

Radio station in Atlanta, Georgia

- Atlanta, Georgia; United States
- Broadcast area: Atlanta metropolitan area
- Frequency: 1480 kHz
- Branding: WYZE Radio

Programming
- Format: Gospel

Ownership
- Owner: Ray Neal; (New Ground Broadcasting, LLC)

History
- First air date: March 16, 1956

Technical information
- Licensing authority: FCC
- Facility ID: 24145
- Class: D
- Power: 7,000 watts day 45 watts night
- Transmitter coordinates: 33°41′47.4″N 84°28′28.7″W

Links
- Public license information: Public file; LMS
- Webcast: Listen Live
- Website: www.wyzeradio.com

WYZE (1480 kHz) is a gospel AM radio station licensed to Atlanta, Georgia broadcasting with 7,000 watts of power during daytime hours, and 45 watts of power during nighttime hours with a non-directional antenna pattern. The station is owned by Ray Neal, through licensee New Ground Broadcasting, LLC.

== History ==
WYZE signed on March 16, 1956. The 1480 kHz frequency was previously used by WAGA, which moved to 590 kHz in 1942; despite using the same frequency, WYZE has no connection to WAGA, which has since become WDWD. WYZE broadcast during daytime hours with what appeared to be an adult standards radio format popular during the 1950s. Fay Fueller hosted a romantic music show consisting of poetry and music in 1958.

Former logo

In 1968, the station switched from a country music format to country/gospel. The station aired a "Town and Country" radio format by 1970. During the early 1970s the station flipped to an all-news radio format for a time, one of the first in the Atlanta radio market. In 1980, WYZE changed to a gospel format relying mainly on brokered programming.

WYZE went silent in November 2018 due to technical problems that would have required cost-prohibitive repairs. It was reported that then-owner GHB Broadcasting intended to sell WYZE's existing property and relocate, and had also received offers for the station's license and equipment. Effective May 30, 2019, GHB Broadcasting consummated the sale of WYZE to New Ground Broadcasting, LLC.
