= WPXA-TV =

Television station in Rome, Georgia

- Rome–Atlanta, Georgia; United States
- City: Rome, Georgia
- Channels: Digital: 16 (UHF); Virtual: 14

Programming
- Affiliations: 14.1: Ion Television; for others, see § Subchannels

Ownership
- Owner: Ion Media; (Ion Television License, LLC)

History
- First air date: February 29, 1988
- Former call signs: WAWA-TV (1988–1990); WTLK-TV (1990–1998)
- Former channel numbers: Analog: 14 (UHF, 1988–2009); Digital: 51 (UHF, 2002–2015), 31 (UHF, 2015–2019)
- Former affiliations: Independent (1988–1995); inTV (1995–1998)
- Call sign meaning: Pax TV Atlanta

Technical information
- Licensing authority: FCC
- Facility ID: 51969
- ERP: 687 kW
- HAAT: 596 m (1,955 ft)
- Transmitter coordinates: 34°18′48″N 84°38′55″W

Links
- Public license information: Public file; LMS
- Website: iontelevision.com

WPXA-TV (channel 14) is a television station licensed to Rome, Georgia, United States, broadcasting the Ion Television network to the Atlanta area. Owned by the Ion Media subsidiary of the E. W. Scripps Company, the station maintains a transmitter on Bear Mountain, near the Cherokee–Bartow county line.

Channel 14 went on the air February 29, 1988, as WAWA-TV. The station was built by Sudbrink Broadcasting, which had acquired the permit from American Communications & Television prior to launch. After operating for two and a half years as a general-entertainment independent station with local news for the Rome area, Sudbrink moved the station into the Atlanta market with a new transmitter facility, a new WTLK-TV call sign, and a prime time lineup of local and national talk shows. Neal Boortz, Suzette Charles, and Hosea Williams were among WTLK-TV's lineup of hosts. The station suffered from an inability to gain channel space on Atlanta's cable systems and by 1993 was mostly airing reruns and country music videos. It was acquired by Paxson Communications, forerunner to Ion Media, in 1994 and became an infomercial station; these stations formed the core of the Pax network, predecessor to Ion, in 1998.

== History ==
=== WAWA-TV: Construction ===
In March 1984, after an agreement among four applicants seeking the channel, American Communications & Television (AC&T) of Gainesville, Florida, won the construction permit to build channel 14 in Rome. This would be the city's first station since what was then WROM-TV on channel 9 moved to Chattanooga, Tennessee, as WTVC in 1957. AC&T selected the call sign WZGA and proposed a conventional general-entertainment independent station, but it prioritized constructing KOOG-TV in Ogden, Utah, first. It deferred the construction of the Rome station to late 1985 after deciding to change tower sites; originally proposed for Mount Alto, AC&T instead selected a site on Vineyard's Mountain in Bartow County so the station could extend its signal into Cobb County. AC&T sold the construction permit to Sudbrink Broadcasting of West Palm Beach, Florida, in 1986. Sudbrink elected to proceed with the original Mount Alto site; in November 1987, Sudbrink bought a building on Shorter Avenue to house the station's studios.

Channel 14 began telecasting as WAWA-TV on February 29, 1988. The station offered talk shows, movies, sitcoms, and two local newscasts each day.

=== WTLK-TV: Talk TV for Atlanta ===
On February 1, 1990, zoning officials in Cherokee County approved the construction of a new tower on Pine Log (or Bear) Mountain, northwest of Canton; the new facility would provide a signal into the Atlanta and Chattanooga, Tennessee, markets. Sudbrink also committed to build a second studio in Cherokee County, in Woodstock; it was later involved in a lawsuit with the county zoning board over the requirement. The new transmitter facility, constructed at a cost of $2 million, was activated in December 1990. Shortly prior, the station changed its call sign to WTLK-TV ahead of its plan to implement a 24-hour talk-show format.

In March 1991, WTLK-TV signed a lease for studio facilities on Cobb Parkway in Marietta, en route to a planned June 1 launch of new programming, and picked up two NBC game shows not aired by local affiliate WXIA-TV. It also announced that it would discontinue its Rome-area local newscasts while retaining the Shorter Avenue studios and offices. The initial phase was intended to bring talk programming to prime time during the week with planned expansion later.

The new local talk shows debuted on June 17, 1991. Five nights a week, the station presented Talk of the Town with former Miss America Suzette Charles and Michael Young, previously of ESPN, as well as Talk at Nite, hosted by WGST's Brian Wilson. Two other shows alternated: The Mike Roberts Show, hosted by WVEE's morning host, and Boortz!, hosted by Neal Boortz (then also of WGST). The prime time lineup was finished out with two national syndicated shows: Phil Donahue and Sally Jessy Raphael. In debuting its new programming, billed as the first all-talk prime-time lineup, WTLK-TV found itself struggling to reach viewers. Must-carry rules for local stations on cable systems were not then in effect, and Atlanta cable providers—to which 60 percent of metro-area viewers were subscribed—were not adding WTLK to their lineups. After failing to land a slot on any local cable system, Sudbrink conducted a round of layoffs in September 1991, including Young. Suzette Charles departed effective December 1, finding the operation "not up to my professional standards". At one point, Boortz was telling his radio listeners that WTLK would end all of its talk shows on January 17, 1992, with no cable slot in sight. Boortz departed in March 1992, and the next month, Wilson lost his job hosting Talk at Nite when he engaged in an on-air tirade prompted by technical miscues. Hosea Williams came aboard as a weekly show host after their departures. That August, WTLK added CBS This Morning, which local CBS affiliate WAGA-TV was preempting to air a local morning show.

By 1993, WTLK-TV's schedule consisted mostly of CBS This Morning, country music videos, and reruns. That year, Joel Babbit almost bought the station with plans to expand its talk lineup to 24 hours, with a broader topic mix including home improvement and gardening shows and a model of selling a sponsorship for each talk hour. Babbit abandoned the plan when he became an executive at Whittle Communications less than two months later. Even though must-carry laws had been reintroduced, a dispute over the station's location classification for copyright purposes kept it off the two largest Atlanta cable systems, because the systems, GCTV and Wometco, believed they would have to pay royalties.

=== Paxson/Ion ownership ===
In 1994, Sudbrink sold WTLK-TV to Paxson Communications Corporation, which initially proposed a Christian format. It was Paxson's second television station that it owned, after WPBF serving West Palm Beach, and alongside a station it managed in Miami. Shortly after the acquisition, Atlanta's major cable systems finally added WTLK to their lineups; previously, it had only been on some smaller suburban systems. During this time, the station became the new television home of Atlanta Knights minor-league hockey. Paxson announced the creation of its Infomall TV infomercial network in January 1995 and included WTLK-TV among its first stations.

On August 31, 1998, the Paxson-owned stations formed the nucleus for the new Pax TV network. The station's call sign had been changed that January to WPXA-TV. In the early 2000s, WPXA-TV entered into a joint sales agreement with WXIA-TV, under which the latter station sold channel 14's local advertising and WPXA rebroadcast two of WXIA-TV's newscasts. WPXA also aired the Atlanta Falcons coach's show as part of WXIA-TV's partnership with the NFL team. After canceling all of its joint sales agreements and changing its name to i: Independent Television in 2005, the network became known as Ion Television in 2007, following the 2006 name change of Paxson Communications Corporation to Ion Media Networks. The E. W. Scripps Company acquired Ion in a deal announced in 2020 and completed in 2021.

== Subchannels ==
WPXA-TV's transmitter is located on Bear Mountain, near the Cherokee–Bartow county line. The station's signal is multiplexed:

Subchannels of WPXA-TV
| Subchannel | Res. | Short name | Programming |
|---|---|---|---|
| 14.1 | 720p | ION | Ion Television |
| 14.2 | 720p | IONPlus | Ion Plus |
| 14.3 | 480i | Laff | Laff |
| 14.4 | 480i | Mystery | Ion Mystery |
| 14.5 | 480i | DEFY | Defy |
| 14.6 | 480i | Grit | Busted |
| 14.7 | 480i | GameSho | Game Show Central |
| 14.8 | 480i | HSN2 | HSN2 |

WPXA-TV began digital broadcasts on channel 51 on January 5, 2002. The digital signal remained on channel 51 until 2014, when its channel was changed to 31 to eliminate interference with wireless communications services on adjacent frequencies. In September 2019, WPXA-TV moved from channel 31 to 16 as a result of the spectrum incentive auction.
