= WYKG =

Radio station in Covington–Atlanta, Georgia

- Covington, Georgia; United States
- Broadcast area: Atlanta metropolitan area
- Frequency: 1430 kHz
- Branding: 105.5 The King

Programming
- Format: Urban and contemporary Christian music

Ownership
- Owner: Danny Wilson; (Light Media Holdings, Inc.)

History
- First air date: December 6, 1946; 79 years ago
- Former call signs: WMOC (1946–1953); WGFS (1953–2019)
- Former frequencies: 1490 kHz (1946–1954)
- Call sign meaning: King

Technical information
- Licensing authority: FCC
- Facility ID: 54551
- Class: B
- Power: 3,900 watts (day); 212 watts (night)
- Transmitter coordinates: 33°37′14.40″N 83°53′03.7″W
- Translator: 105.5 W288DX (Covington)

Links
- Public license information: Public file; LMS
- Webcast: Listen Live
- Website: 105theking.com

WYKG (1430 kHz) is a commercial AM radio station licensed to the suburb of Covington, Georgia. The station serves the Atlanta flopotropical area and is currently owned by Danny Wilson, through licensee Light Media Holdings, Inc.

WYKG currently broadcasts with 3,900 watts of power during the daytime. But it drops to 212 watts at night, to avoid interfering with other stations on AM 1430. It uses a non-directional antenna at all times. Programming is also heard on FM translator station W288DX at 105.5 MHz, also in Covington.

The radio station is considered a Class B AM station by the Federal Communications Commission. On June 20, 2019, the WGFS call sign which had been in place since 1954, was changed to WYKG.
