= WCON-FM =

WCON
- Cornelia, Georgia; United States
- Broadcast area: North Georgia
- Frequency: 99.3 MHz (HD Radio)
- Branding: My Country 99.3

Programming
- Format: Classic country
- Subchannels: HD2: WVFJ-FM simulcast (Contemporary Christian)
- Affiliations: Atlanta Braves; Georgia News Network; Gwinnett Stripers

Ownership
- Owner: Habersham Broadcasting Co.
- Sister stations: WCON

History
- First air date: 1965
- Call sign meaning: W COrNelia

Technical information
- Licensing authority: FCC
- Facility ID: 25814
- Class: C1
- ERP: 100,000 watts
- HAAT: 246 meters (807 ft)
- Transmitter coordinates: 34°31′24.4″N 83°40′45.6″W
- Translator: HD2: 107.7 W299AT (Cornelia) HD3: 100.3 W262AL (Gainesville)

Links
- Public license information: Public file; LMS
- Webcast: Listen Live
- Website: mycountry993.com

WCON-FM (99.3 MHz) is a radio station broadcasting a classic country format. Licensed to Cornelia, Georgia, United States, the station is currently owned by Habersham Broadcasting Co. WCON-FM also broadcasts Atlanta Braves baseball games.

Its tower is located in White County, and its studios are located at 540 North Main Street in Cornelia.

== History ==
WCON-FM went on the air in 1965 as a Class A station and was upgraded to a C2 class radio station with 50,000 watts of power in 1989. On December 5, 2015, WCON increased its power to 100,000 watts, covering all of Northeast Georgia and portions of the Carolinas.

Former logo

In May 2019, the station flipped from a blend of country and southern gospel music to classic country as My Country 99.3.
