= WCFO =

- East Point, Georgia; United States
- Broadcast area: Atlanta metropolitan area
- Frequency: 1160 kHz
- Branding: Atlanta Catholic Radio, Inc.

Programming
- Format: Catholic talk and teaching
- Affiliations: EWTN Radio Network

Ownership
- Owner: Atlanta Catholic Radio

History
- First air date: October 9, 1994 (as WERD)
- Call sign meaning: Chief Financial Officer (from previous business talk format)

Technical information
- Licensing authority: FCC
- Facility ID: 15521
- Class: D
- Power: 50,000 watts day 160 watts night
- Transmitter coordinates: 33.826111°N 84.605556°W

Links
- Public license information: Public file; LMS
- Webcast: Listen Live
- Website: TheQuestAtlanta.com

WCFO (1160 kHz) is a listener-supported AM radio station, licensed to East Point, Georgia. It airs a Catholic radio format and is owned by Atlanta Catholic Radio. Most of the programming comes from the EWTN Radio Network. It is one of two Catholic stations in the Atlanta metropolitan area. WAFS 1190 AM carries programming from the Relevant Radio Network.

By day, WCFO broadcasts at 50,000 watts, the maximum power for AM radio stations in the U.S. But because AM 1160 is a clear channel frequency reserved for Class A KSL in Salt Lake City, WCFO must reduce power at night to 160 watts to avoid interference with KSL and other pre-existing stations. WCFO uses a directional antenna in the daytime. The four-tower array transmitter site is off Arnold Drive in Austell, Georgia.

== History ==
=== Early years ===
The 1160 frequency in the Atlanta radio market has had a difficult history. Founder Darryl Spann, an Atlanta businessman, originally got a construction permit from the Federal Communications Commission (FCC) in 1987, using the call sign WMLD. But the station did not sign on until October 9, 1994, then as WERD. Even after going on the air, it had several periods where it was dark for a few months.

WERD was playing classic R&B when on July 4, 1995, new program director Mitch Faulkner started playing rap music at night and hired several young DJs. Noted R&B singer James Brown, a part owner of WERD, soon put an end to the rap because he did not like it.

In summer 1996, WERD ended its rhythm and blues format and joined the Prime Sports Network with a sports radio format. The station went off the air in 1997. Atlanta businessman Darrell Spann and Atlanta Area Broadcasting returned the station to the air in July 1998 as WKGE with a classic country format.

On April 2, 2001, Billy Corey bought WMLB (1170 AM) in Cumming, Georgia and changed its format, along with adjacent 1180 WKGE, to oldies, specifically oldies that had not been heard on other stations.

=== Americana, oldies and standards ===
The change at WMLB did not make listeners happy. In 1995, WMLB changed from country music to Americana, and, although it did not reach all of Atlanta with its 5,000-watt signal, it was the only station of its type in the area. The format included familiar names such as Willie Nelson, Waylon Jennings, Dolly Parton, Johnny Cash, Linda Ronstadt, Mary Chapin Carpenter, Bob Dylan, and Tom Petty, as well as less mainstream artists such as John Prine, Guy Clark, Emmylou Harris, Rodney Crowell, Townes Van Zandt, Jerry Jeff Walker, Son Volt, Wilco, Steve Earle, Jerry Garcia, and the Atlanta band The Vidalias. WMLB program director Chris Marino won Americana program director of the year from The Gavin Report in 1997.

WKGE and WMLB became "The Twins: Classic 1160 and Classic 1170." WKGE planned to increase its 10,000-watt signal to 50,000 watts. The playlist included "Palisades Park" by Freddy Cannon, "Galveston" by Glen Campbell, "Chantilly Lace" by The Big Bopper, "Hawaii Five-O" by The Ventures, "Suspicion" by Terry Stafford, "Little GTO" by Ronny & the Daytonas, and "Yes I'm Ready" by Barbara Mason. The music collection included 9000 songs, including some by The Tams with their original lineup. General manager Ron McCarter, described as "a voracious record collector," said Americana was "not commercially viable" but also said it was "a great format." WMLB fans wished the pairing of the two stations had resulted in Americana covering the entire area.

The power boost by 1160 AM (not including the limited nighttime signal), which became WMLB, involved moving the tower from East Point to Austell. By 2003, when the change took effect, the stations' format was adult standards from local DJs in the morning and afternoon and the Music of Your Life network at other times, with such artists as Frank Sinatra, Nat King Cole, Tony Bennett, Ella Fitzgerald, Norah Jones, and Diana Krall. The 1170 frequency left the air in 2003.

By 2005, WMLB had what was described as an "eclectic" format.

=== Switch to talk ===
WCFO's logo from its talk radio format.

In 2006, the station was acquired by JW Broadcasting, owned by Joe Weber, which already owned AM 1690, licensed to nearby Avondale Estates, Georgia. Weber decided to move the WMLB call sign and format from 1160 kHz to the 1690 kHz frequency in order to increase WMLB's coverage area. The facility at 1160 kHz switched to the call letters WCFO and adopted a business talk radio format in June 2006. The call letters were chosen to spell out the title Chief Financial Officer. Programming on WCFO included both nationally syndicated business and money shows and locally produced local and state news updates. Westwood One News was carried at the beginning of most hours for world and national news.

On April 1, 2008, WCFO switched to a general talk format, known as "The Talk of The Town." Some of the syndicated shows heard on WCFO included Mancow, Dr. Laura, Phil Hendrie, Laura Ingraham, Michael Savage and Lou Dobbs. On April 6, 2009, it was announced that Don Imus's syndicated radio program, Imus in the Morning, would move from WYAY to WCFO.

On April 16, 2010, Georgia State University reached an agreement for WCFO to serve as the official flagship radio station airing Georgia State Panthers football and men's basketball. Earlier, WCFO had carried Clemson University Tigers football from the Clemson Tigers Sports Network.

=== Catholic programming ===
In April 2018, JW Broadcasting sold WCFO to Atlanta Catholic Radio, to air religious talk programs. About 15 full and part time workers were laid off in the sale. The price tag was $750,000, and the sale was consummated on October 12, 2018. JW Broadcasting, owned by Joe Weber, continues to own 1690 WMLB.
