= WAFS (AM) =

Radio station in Atlanta, Georgia, United States

- Atlanta, Georgia; United States
- Broadcast area: Atlanta metropolitan area
- Frequency: 1190 kHz
- Branding: Relevant Radio

Programming
- Format: Catholic talk and teaching
- Network: Relevant Radio

Ownership
- Owner: Relevant Radio, Inc.

History
- First air date: September 1, 1955
- Former call signs: WGKA (1955–2004)
- Former frequencies: 1600 kHz (1955–1967)

Technical information
- Licensing authority: FCC
- Facility ID: 72111
- Class: D
- Power: 25,000 watts (day); 350 watts (PSRA); 54 to 150 watts (PSSA)
- Transmitter coordinates: 33.809444°N 84.353889°W

Links
- Public license information: Public file; LMS
- Webcast: Listen live
- Website: relevantradio.com

WAFS (1190 AM) is a noncommercial radio station licensed to Atlanta, Georgia, United States, serving Metro Atlanta. It broadcasts Catholic talk and teaching programs as an the Relevant Radio Network.

The station's transmitter tower is located off Lenox Road NE at the Morningside Nature Preserve.

== History ==
=== WGKA ===
The station signed on the air on September 1, 1955. The call sign was WGKA, originally transmitting on 1600 AM. WGKA was owned by Glenkaren Associates, headed by Locke E. Glenn, hence the acronym. Glenkaren Associates also owned a hi-fi audio store adjoining the radio station. WGKA aired a classical music format.

In 1967, the station moved to 1190 kHz under the supervision of Chief Engineer Lewis Edge. Shortly afterward, Edge installed a new FM stereo transmitter and a 150 foot (46 m) tower erected on the roof of the Peachtree Center Building. The studios were also moved from the building housing the hi-fi store to Peachtree Center.

WGKA-AM-FM simulcast their classical music format until 1971. The stations occasionally carried syndicated classical programs from the BBC and major orchestras. Several of the hosts who once worked at the station, such as Jonathan Phelps and David Jacobs, switched to working at public radio station 90.1 WABE FM when WGKA-FM was sold. Lee Nance and Arthur Borgeson were also hosts. The FM station's call letters changed to WZGC, now airing a sports radio format.

WGKA was later sold to Salem Communications, the nation's largest owner of Christian radio stations.

=== WAFS ===
Logo as "Biz 1190"

On March 24, 2004, the Moody Bible Institute sold its Atlanta AM station, WAFS on 920 kHz, to Salem Communications. Salem next swapped the call letters between WGKA and WAFS, effective August 2, 2004, resulting in the WAFS call sign moving to 1190 kHz, and the WGKA call letters transferring to 920 kHz.

In July 2006, Salem entered a Local marketing agreement (LMA) that changed the station's format to Spanish-language Tropical music under the brand of "Mega 1190". However, the arrangement was abruptly pulled by Salem in February 2007 due to a dispute with the LMA. WAFS then switched to a Spanish language Christian format using the "Radio Luz" branding.

On April 6, 2010, the format was changed again to a business news and talk radio format with "Biz 1190" branding. Biz 1190 carried programming from the Bloomberg Radio network and aired brokered programming on money and investing.

=== Catholic radio ===
On August 15, 2019, Salem Communications announced the sale of WAFS and eight other stations to Immaculate Heart Media for $8.7 million. The sale was consummated in November 2019.

WAFS became a network affiliate of Relevant Radio. The network airs Catholic programs, including discussion, prayer and religious services. It is based in Wisconsin.
