= H. Johnson =

American radio personality

- Born: 1937 (age 88–89); Asbury Park, New Jersey
- Occupations: Radio personality, musician
- Years active: 1978–present
- Employer: WABE-FM

Herman "H." Johnson (born 1937) is an American radio personality in Atlanta, Georgia. He is known for his weekly program "Jazz Classics" which he has hosted since 1978 on WABE, North Georgia's local NPR affiliate.

== Biography ==
Johnson grew up in Asbury Park, New Jersey and is African-American. Count Basie was a family friend who would visit periodically and play his mother's piano. When his parents amicably divorced, Johnson moved to Atlanta with his stepfather.

He graduated from Atlanta's L. J. Price High School in 1957. He also attended Morehouse College and Atlanta Area Tech. While in the U.S. Army he received NCO training.

Since his teenage years, he has worked at various Atlanta radio stations including WAOK, WIGO, WRFG, WCLK, and WXAP.

His program "Jazz Classics" airs each Saturday night on WABE from 8 pm to 2 am; the program began in 1978. The program always begins with the Father Tom Vaughn version of "The Battle Hymn of the Republic" and usually ends with a version of "I'll Be Seeing You." At midnight, Johnson plays a weekly selection of "just the right version" of "'Round Midnight."

In the fall of 2013, the station introduced a second program hosted by him, "Blues Classics," on Friday evenings. This program airs from 11 pm to 2 am.

In his off-air life, in past years, he operated a gift shop in southwestern Atlanta. He lives with his wife Marilyn in Mableton, Georgia; she accompanies him to the studio in Atlanta when he does his program each Saturday.

== Honors ==
In 2001, Johnson was one of the first six recipients of the Paul Mitchell Community Jazz Awards, presented by local station WRFG.

On June 21, 2010, a tribute to Johnson was held at Atlanta jazz club Café 290 in honor of his 30 years on the air at WABE. The Atlanta City Council declared the day "H. Johnson Day" in his honor. Coverage of the event aired on local PBS affiliate WABE-TV in the fall of 2010.
