= WRAS (FM) =

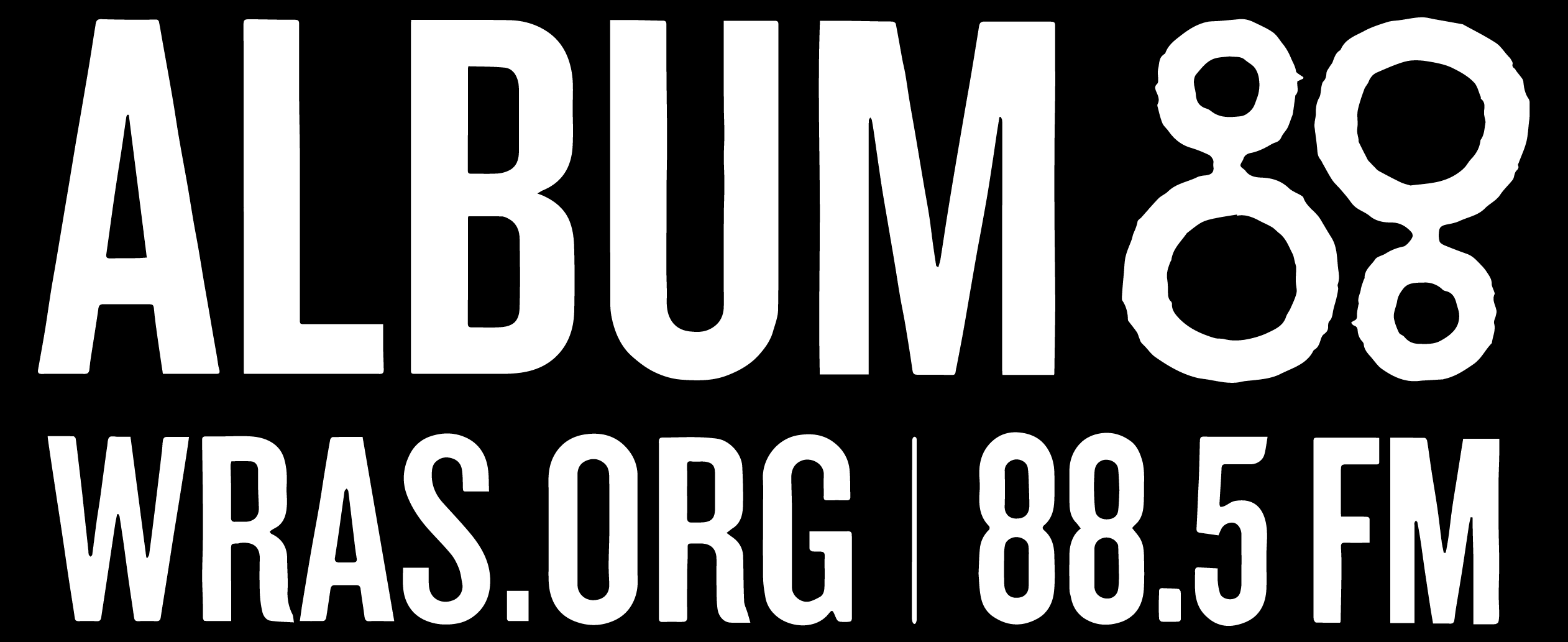

- Atlanta, Georgia; United States
- Broadcast area: Atlanta metropolitan area
- Frequency: 88.5 MHz (HD Radio)
- Branding: Days: 88.5 GPB Atlanta; Nights: Album 88

Programming
- Format: Days: Public radio and talk; Nights: College radio
- Subchannels: HD2: College radio; HD3: Oldies
- Affiliations: Days: NPR

Ownership
- Owner: Georgia State University
- Operator: Georgia State University

History
- First air date: January 18, 1971
- Call sign meaning: Radio at State

Technical information
- Licensing authority: FCC
- Facility ID: 23959
- Class: C1
- ERP: 50,000 watts
- HAAT: 318 m (1,043 ft)
- Transmitter coordinates: 33°44′41.4″N 84°21′35.7″W

Links
- Public license information: Public file; LMS
- Webcast: Album 88: Listen live (via TuneIn); GPB Atlanta: Listen live
- Website: www.wrasfm.org www.gpb.org/atlanta

WRAS (88.5 FM) is a non-commercial radio station licensed to Atlanta, Georgia, United States, serving the Atlanta metro. Owned by Georgia State University, its schedule is split between a college radio format (Album 88) airing from 7 p.m. to 5 a.m. and public radio programming from Georgia Public Broadcasting (88.5 GPB Atlanta) airing from 5 a.m. to 7 p.m. daily. Student programming is funded by GSU's Student Activity Fee, while station maintenance is partially funded by GPB. The Album 88 and 88.5 GPB Atlanta formats are both programmed for 24 hours a day, with each available on separate internet streams, and Album 88 is also available full-time on WRAS's HD2 subchannel.

The transmitter is located off Interstate 20 on Old Flat Shoals Road Southeast in eastern Atlanta. The Album 88 student studios and offices are located inside room number 271 of the West Student Center on the campus of Georgia State University on Courtland Street in downtown Atlanta, while the GPB studios are located in its headquarters off 14th Street NW in Midtown Atlanta.

Students at Georgia State host and produce all of the programs on Album 88, with the exception of Georgia State Panthers sporting events. While GPB public radio is heard around the clock on several simulcast radio stations in Georgia, listeners in the Atlanta area only hear the daytime schedule on WRAS. GPB is one of two Atlanta-based National Public Radio affiliate stations; the other is the full-time WABE, with its own news department and programming. The two stations carry overlapping NPR programming, such as All Things Considered, Fresh Air, and Morning Edition.

== Programming ==
=== Album 88 ===
In addition to a student management team, Album 88 has over 50 student volunteers who host many of the programs, all of which air on their HD-1 hours (7p-5a). As of 2024, their specialty programming changes as students enroll and graduate each semester and consists of 2-hour blocks. Long-running shows include: Melodically Challenged (poetry and alternative music, nationally syndicated), The Georgia Music Show (dedicated exclusively to artists from Georgia), Mighty Aphrodite (female vocalists), Rhythm & Vibes (Atlanta's longest-running hip hop show) along with newer shows created by current students.

On hours not occupied by specialty programming, and all hours between 5am-7pm, Album 88 features a rotation of curated local and underground music, with emphasis on what's been released in the most recent six months. The playlist on rotation includes multiple songs from each included album.

The staff of the radio station has also organized the annual music show called WRASFest, usually spotlighting local and underground talent. It's been historically hosted by small or medium-sized venues in Atlanta, like the Masquerade.

=== GPB ===
On May 6, 2014, Georgia State University announced that WRAS would turn over its daytime hours to a new Atlanta-only service from the radio division of Georgia Public Broadcasting (branded "GPB Atlanta"), with news/talk programming between the hours of 5 a.m. to 7 p.m., leaving the remaining ten hours of the day for student airtime. Daytime programs would continue on Album 88, but accessible only via a new digital subchannel and streaming live on the station's website.

GPB paid $150,000 to GSU for the rights to broadcast on WRAS, in addition to a commitment to have GSU communications-major students obtain internships with GPB. GSU was also promised a weekly "Georgia music" program on the GPB state network. The contract was drawn for a two-year period, but it automatically renews, and contains a clause that could theoretically allow for the sharing or transfer of the license to GPB in the future. The student government (SGA) had allocated over $300,000 for the transmitter before finding out that most of its usage would be for GPB instead of for GSU students.

== History ==
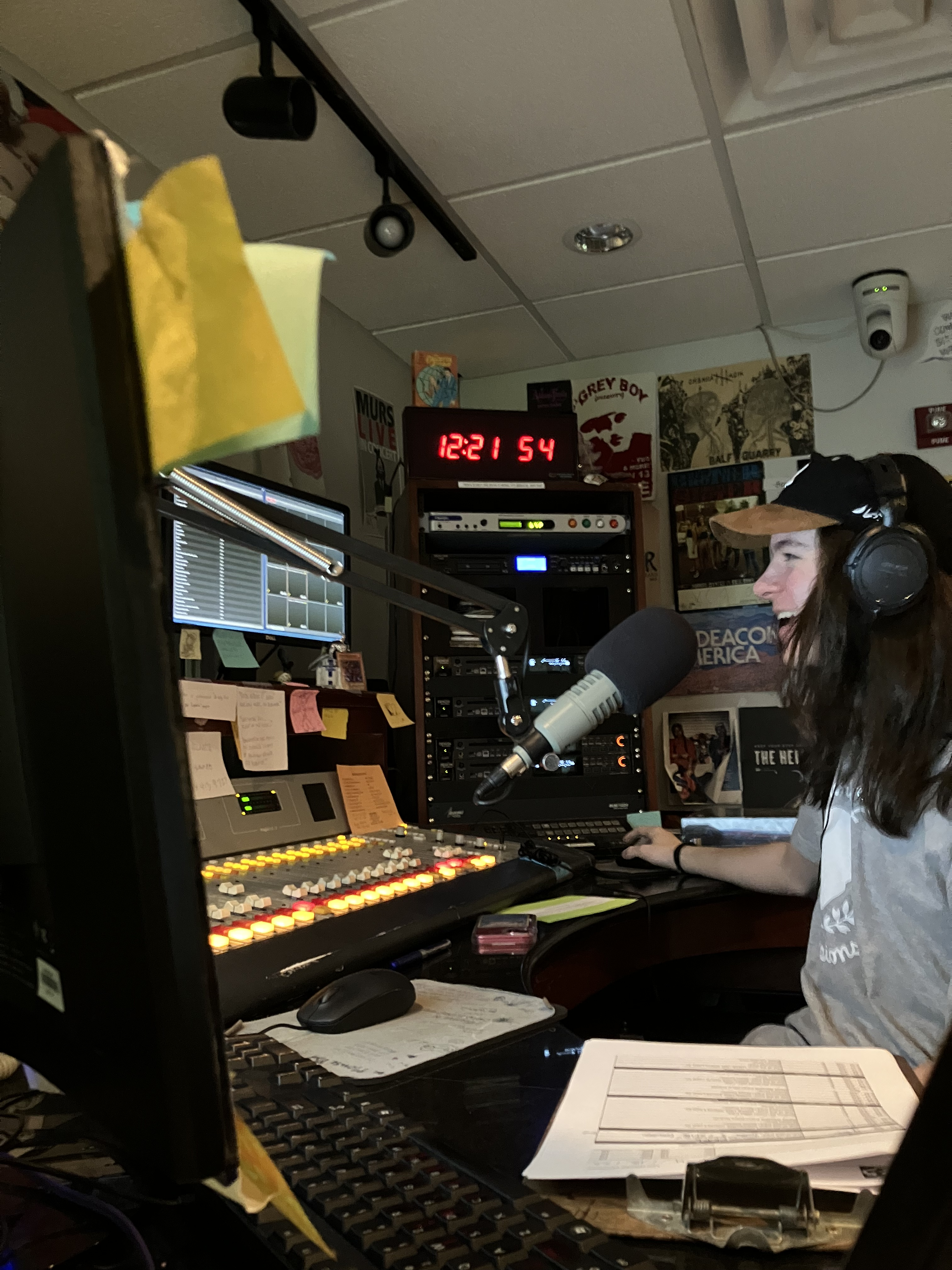

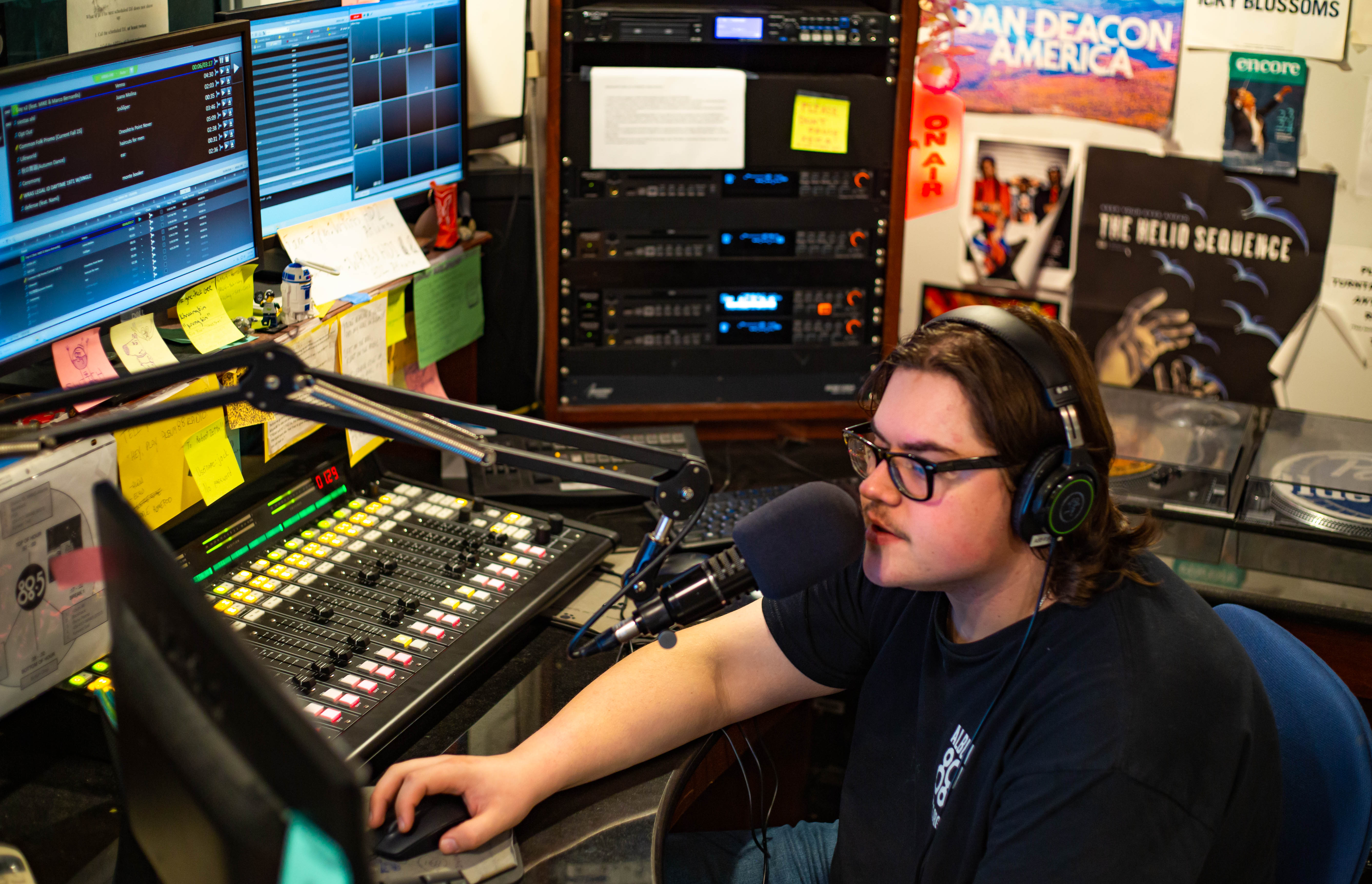
Student DJs perform radio shifts in the Album 88 broadcast booth.

On January 18, 1971, WRAS first began broadcasting, originally with an effective radiated power of 19,500 watts.

The callsign WRAS was not first on the list of preferred callsigns for the station. The callsign WGSU and a few others were already taken, so WRAS was accepted, standing for "Radio At State." The first image lines for WRAS were "The Stereo Alternative" and the "Stereo Odyssey," although most listeners simply referred to the station as "rass." In 1982 the student general manager at the time changed the image line to "Album 88" and lessened the use of the callsign after seeing Arbitron radio ratings diaries in which listeners regularly confused FM stations WRAS, WRFG and WREK, which were all nearby each other on the radio dial. Album 88 refers to the album-based rotation the format employs: stressing several cuts from each album rather than a single.

Album 88's first general manager was Richard Belcher, well known in later years to Atlanta television viewers for his investigative reporting, first on WAGA-TV and later WSB-TV. Alumni of the station span the range of media, from executive positions at the major recording labels and cable networks to air talent at radio and TV stations across the country.

Album 88 has won numerous awards, frequently beating out commercial radio stations, from the former Atlanta weekly Creative Loafing, the monthly Atlanta magazine, and the former College Music Journal. And for a student station with no budget for promotion, the station was also unusually successful, according to the Birch, Arbitron and, more recently, Nielsen ratings. While most student stations in the pre-internet era self-consciously eschewed popularity, WRAS sought to play a wide variety of music while gaining the largest audience possible. The station's impact on record sales in Atlanta led to the inclusion of Album 88 as a reporting station to Billboard magazine for a time in the 1980s. With the increasing number of stations on the FM dial in Atlanta since the 1990s, some commercial stations have increasingly targeted segments of the traditional WRAS audience. Keeping true to its roots, Album 88 today airs a wider variety of music to reflect the much wider range of music genres and sub-genres which have developed in the post-internet era.

Album 88 has played a crucial role in "breaking" a wide range of artists including R.E.M., Deerhunter and Outkast. Several platinum and gold records hang in Album 88's studios and offices. According to Bob Geldof, he penned the Boomtown Rats hit song, "I Don't Like Mondays" in the Album 88 office after reading a telex report of the schoolyard shooting on which the song is based.

On March 14, 2008, an F-2 tornado struck Atlanta's downtown core and led to the evacuation of students and employees from parts of the Georgia State campus. Album 88 was forced to suspend broadcasting for nearly two days. (See 2008 Atlanta tornado)

=== GPB transfer ===
Despite being in the works for years, the signal transfer arrangement with GPB was kept secret until the day after final exams ended, as students were leaving campus for the summer or preparing for graduation, and the station's management was making its annual change. GSU and GPB officials claimed that the deal had only been finalized the day before. This made Album 88 staff and GSU students upset at the manner in which it was handled, with some claiming that the transaction may have been illegal. Student anger manifested itself at a protest during GSU's spring commencement ceremony, and a social media campaign with the tag #savewras, A petition on change.org drew over 10,000 signatories.

Claims were made that the new daytime programming had the benefit of bringing more NPR news and talk programming to radio listeners in Atlanta. Until the fall of 2015, Atlanta's main NPR affiliate, WABE, had long aired classical music during the day between the morning and afternoon "drive time" periods. A number of NPR programs popular elsewhere in the U.S. were not heard in the Atlanta market until WABE launched an all-news stream on its third HD subcarrier; still others were heard on Clark Atlanta University's WCLK, an otherwise jazz-formatted station with a weaker signal than WABE. But with WABE's move to replace daytime music with informational programs (made in response to the new WRAS programming as perceived competition), much of GPB's shows on WRAS began, inadvertently or not, duplicating programming already airing on WABE.

This is the second time that GPB has made use of a student station from a state university. In 2004, WUWG in Carrollton was acquired from the University of West Georgia, its entire broadcast license transferred from UWG to GPB. During the 2000s, the Radio Communications Board of Georgia Tech declined similar overtures made by GPB to its long-running WREK.

Album 88 supporters also raised concerns about the appearance of a conflict of interest by Douglass Covey, Vice President for Student Affairs at GSU. Until April 2014, he served on the board of Public Broadcasting Atlanta, the arm of the Atlanta Public Schools that operates WABE and WABE-TV, during the same time GSU was negotiating the deal to bring GPB into competition for listener donations and corporate underwritings that would otherwise go to support WABE.

=== Reactions ===
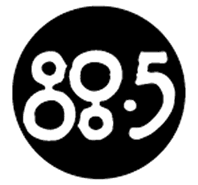
Alternate logo, featuring the station's frequency.

As one of the most influential college radio stations in the nation, support for keeping the Album 88 format on WRAS full-time, with no outside programming, came in from across the country. Efforts to save full-time programming on Album 88 were organized. Some called for a boycott of Georgia Public Broadcasting and its underwriters. In late June, 55 stations in 25 states broadcast a live program in support of Album 88. These efforts, however, were unsuccessful in persuading either GSU or GPB to annul the arrangement.

Album 88 alumni proposed the use of a low-power FM translator for GPB programming in the Atlanta area. Another solution would have been the purchase of a different, presumably commercial, FM station in the Atlanta radio market. But those ideas were rejected. Ultimately, the plan was allowed to go forward, and student programming was relegated to off-time hours on the analog waves.

== See also ==
- Campus radio
- List of college radio stations in the United States
