= Herman Johnson =

Herman Johnson may refer to:

- Herman Johnson (American football) (born 1985), American football guard
- Herman A. Johnson (1916–2004), businessman, politician, philanthropist and civic leader in Missouri
- Herman E. Johnson (1909–1975), American country blues guitarist
- Herm Johnson (1953–2016), American racing driver
- H. Johnson (born 1937/38), American radio personality
