= The Knot Garden =

1970 opera by composer Michael Tippett

- Opera by Michael Tippett
- Librettist: Michael Tippett
- Language: English
- Premiere: 2 December 1970; Royal Opera House, London

The Knot Garden is the third opera by composer Michael Tippett for which he wrote the original English libretto. The work had its first performance at the Royal Opera House, Covent Garden, on 2 December 1970 conducted by Sir Colin Davis and produced by Sir Peter Hall. There is a recording with the original cast.

== Performance history ==
The first American performance was in 1974 at Northwestern University, and the first German performance in 1987 at the Musiktheater im Revier in Gelsenkirchen. In 1984 Tippett authorised Meirion Bowen to create a reduced orchestration for a revival with the London Sinfonietta at the Wilde Theatre, conducted by Howard Williams. The reduced version has been revived six times, with productions in Britain, America, Australia, and Austria. There was a revival at the Royal Opera House in 1988, directed by Nicholas Hytner and, in 2005, Scottish Opera produced the opera for the Tippett centenary.

== Roles ==
Roles, voice types, premiere cast
| Role | Voice type | Premiere cast, 2 December 1970 Conductor: Sir Colin Davis |
|---|---|---|
| Faber, a civil engineer | robust baritone | Raimund Herincx |
| Thea, his wife, a gardener | dramatic mezzo-soprano | Yvonne Minton |
| Flora, their ward, an adolescent girl | light high soprano | Jill Gomez |
| Denise, Thea's sister, a freedom fighter | dramatic soprano | Josephine Barstow |
| Mel, a black writer | lyric bass-baritone | Thomas Carey |
| Dov, his white lover, a musician | lyric tenor | Robert Tear |
| Mangus, a psychoanalyst | high tenor baritone | Thomas Hemsley |

== Synopsis ==
=== Act 1 ===
The psychiatrist Mangus introduces the action. Thea enters, soon followed by the hysterical girl Flora, who rushes screaming into Thea's arms. Faber enters, and Thea sends Flora off with Mangus, then scolds Faber for (as she imagines) playing the lecher with Flora. Faber protests "I do not flirt with Flora; Flora screams before I...impossible!"

Mel and Dov enter dressed up as Ariel and Caliban from The Tempest. They are lovers, but Mel flirts with Thea, and out of jealousy Dov makes a play for Faber. This tense foursome is disrupted when Flora again rushes in screaming: Thea's sister Denise has arrived for a visit, and she is disfigured by torture. Denise introduces herself in a dramatic aria about her struggle for universal justice. This becomes an ensemble, and the act closes on Mel's soft rejoinder, "Sure, baby."

=== Act 2 ===
The second act is a dreamlike series of dialogues. In the score, the composer described his vision of the staging: "It appears as if the centre of the stage had the power to 'suck in' a character at the back of the stage, say, and 'eject' him at the front. During their passage through the maze, characters meet and play out their scenes. But always one of the characters in these scenes is about to be ejected while a fresh character has been sucked in and is whirled to the meeting point."

The first pair to appear are Thea and Denise, who speak in parallel, unable to meet. Thea is replaced by Faber, who does make some contact with the touchy Denise, but she is then replaced by Flora, who again reacts to Faber with screams. She is whirled offstage and Denise reappears with a horsewhip, followed by Dov, who continues his earlier flirtation. Faber is responsive, but is spun offstage and replaced by Mel, and the lovers share a duet acknowledging that their affair is ending. Dov now disappears to be replaced by Denise, who sees Mel as representing the oppressed of the earth (the tune to "We Shall Overcome" appears in the orchestra). Characters appear and disappear in quick succession until the sequence ends with Flora alone with Dov.

Dov comforts Flora by encouraging her to sing, and she performs "Die liebe Farbe" from Schubert's Die schöne Müllerin. Dov responds with the song that would later form the first part of the Songs for Dov cycle. The act ends on Mel's re-entry.

=== Act 3 ===
Mangus declares that his production of The Tempest has begun: "This garden is now an island," and the characters obligingly play out the roles Mangus assigns them. In addition to Mel and Dov as Caliban and Ariel, Faber becomes Ferdinand, Flora becomes Miranda, and Mangus is Prospero. Thea and Denise remain themselves and comment on the action, critical of Mangus's controlling and voyeuristic role as impresario of the drama. At the conclusion of the charade Mel and Denise leave together, followed by Dov, who is not yet able to let go. Flora goes off alone. Thea and Faber are reconciled.

== Recordings ==
- Philips 412 707 1: Raimund Herincx, Yvonne Minton, Jill Gomez, Josephine Barstow, Thomas Carey, Robert Tear, Thomas Hemsley; Orchestra of the Royal Opera House, Covent Garden; Sir Colin Davis, conductor

== See also ==
- Knot garden
