= Lois Reitzes =

Atlanta NPR radio host

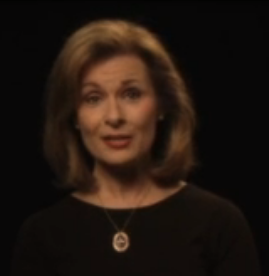
- Occupation: Radio show host
- Organization: WABE

Lois Reitzes is an Atlanta NPR radio show host, best known for her work on WABE FM 90.1's "City Lights with Lois Reitzes" and "Second Cup Concert". She has been a host with WABE since 1979, making her the longest-running voice in Atlanta radio.

== Early life and education ==
Lois Reitzes grew up in Chicago, listening to classical radio stations and playing piano. She and her mother attended classical concerts together, and Reitzes discovered she has perfect pitch.

Reitzes was educated at the Chicago Music Conservatory, graduating with a degree in music history in 1975. She pursued graduate study in at Indiana University School of Music in Bloomington.

== Career and impact ==
Reitzes began her work at WABE FM 90.1, Atlanta's affiliate of NPR, in 1979. She hosted the long-running weekday morning program "Second Cup Concert" from 1982 to 2015. Reitzes hosted "City Lights with Lois Reitzes" from January 2015 until June 2025. "City Lights" is a weekday arts and culture show that covers theater, dance, pop culture, visual arts, and more, with a focus on the Atlanta cultural scene.

Reitzes also produced and hosted WABE's Atlanta Symphony Orchestra broadcasts as well as the "Spivey Soiree" series. She was the program director at WABE from 1992 to 2007, and has served as Director of Arts and Cultural Programming since 2007.

Reitzes retired from WABE on June 25, 2025.
