= Buried Truths =

Investigative journalism podcast

Buried Truths is a history podcast hosted by Hank Klibanoff and produced by WABE, a radio station in Atlanta, Georgia.

== Background ==
Buried Truths and Political Breakfast were the first two podcasts started by WABE. Buried Truths is a history podcast. The first season debuted on March 26, 2018, and was six episodes long. The first season discussed Dover V. Carter and Isaiah Nixon. Klibanoff had previously written about the Nixon case in his Pulitzer Prize winning book entitled The Race Beat. The podcast was renewed for a second season in 2019. The third season of the podcast discusses the murder of Ahmaud Arbery. Klibanoff was nominated by Joe Biden to be a member of the Civil Rights Cold Case Records Review Board. Klibanoff is the director of the Georgia Civil Rights Cold Cases Project at Emory University The podcast is created by Klibanoff and his students. The podcast won a Peabody award in 2018. The podcast won the 2021 Silver Gavel Award. The podcast won an Edward R. Murrow Award in 2020. The podcast won a 2019 Robert F. Kennedy Award.
