= Thomas Carey (baritone) =

American opera singer

Thomas Devore Carey (December 29, 1931 – January 23, 2002) was an African-American operatic baritone. Born in Bennettsville, South Carolina, Carey was educated at universities in New York City and in Germany. He had a major operatic career in Europe during the 1960s; singing leading roles in theaters throughout the continent. While he did not completely stop performing, his singing career was largely put aside after be accepted a position on the voice faculty of the University of Oklahoma (OU) in 1969. He and his wife, contralto Carol Brice, were among the first black people appointed to OU's faculty. In 1975 Carey and his wife co-founded the Cimarron Circuit Opera Company in Norman, Oklahoma. He continued to teach at OU until his death in 2002.

== Life and career ==
Thomas Devore Carey was born in Bennettsville, South Carolina on December 29, 1931. From 1951-1953 he served in the United States Army during the time of the Korean War. After the war he went to New York City where he simultaneously studied music at the City College of New York (1954-1958) and the Henry Street Settlement (1954-1960). At the latter school he starred in a production of Ermanno Wolf-Ferrari's I quatro rusteghi (sung in English as School for Fathers). His teachers in New York included Lola Urbach, Rose Bampton, Felix Popper, Harvey Wedeen, Adelaide Bishop, and Ilse Sass. He made his concert debut at The Town Hall in 1957, and was a winner of the Marian Anderson Award in 1959. He was a member of the Eva Jessye Choir during the late 1950s.

Carey pursued graduate studies in Germany at the State University of Music and Performing Arts Stuttgart (1960-1962) and the University of Music and Theatre Munich (1962-1965). He also studied voice privately in Germany with Hans Hotter and Rupert Gundlach. In 1961 he was a prize winner at both the ARD International Music Competition in Munich and the International Vocal Competition 's-Hertogenbosch. He won another international singing competition held in Brussels the following year.

Carey made his professional opera debut in 1962 as Giorgio Germont in Giuseppe Verdi's La traviata at the Dutch National Opera after which he had a rapid rise in Europe's major opera houses. He had a major success early on at the Paris Opera in the title role of Verdi's Rigoletto. In 1963 he made his debut at the Stuttgart Opera as Absalom Kumalo in the German premiere of Kurt Weil's Lost in the Stars. Other engagements soon followed at the Royal Danish Theatre, Opéra de Nice, Royal Swedish Opera, Teatro Nacional de São Carlos, Theater Basel, National Theatre in Belgrade, Croatian National Theatre, Zagreb, La Fenice, the Salzburg Festival and the Festival dei Due Mondi. He also performed in many German opera houses where he was very popular in the 1960s; starring in productions at the Bavarian State Opera, the Berlin State Opera, the Essen Opera, the Hamburg State Opera, the Opernhaus Dortmund, and the Staatsoper Hannover.

In 1969 Carey married contralto Carol Brice whom he had met earlier in France when they performed together in a production of Porgy and Bess with Carey as Porgy. That same year he joined the voice faculty of the University of Oklahoma (OU) in Norman, Oklahoma; where he had previously served as an artist in residence in 1968. He and his wife were among OU's first black faculty members. While he did not completely stop performing, he abandoned what was a major singing career for a life concentrated primarily on teaching. In 1970, he performed the role of Mel in the world premiere of Michael Tippett's The Knot Garden at the Royal Opera House in London. He appeared in the second London West End revival of Show Boat in the role of Joe, which premiered in 1971.

In Norman Carey co-founded the Cimarron Circuit Opera Company with his wife in 1975. The couple staged and toured in operas with this company in the state of Oklahoma. Carey and his wife also starred in a production of Porgy and Bess staged at the Civic Center Music Hall in 1981 with Cab Calloway. He had previously performed the role of Porgy with the Los Angeles Civic Light Opera, the Atlanta Opera, and in many European theaters.

Carey continued to teach at OU for the remainder of his life, and was still on the faculty of the school when he died of pancreatic cancer at Norman Regional Hospital on January 23, 2002 at the age of 70. His wife Carol predeceased him in 1985. One of his voice students at OU was actor Ed Harris. The Thomas Carey Papers are held in the archive of the Amistad Research Center.
