= Carol Brice =

American opera singer

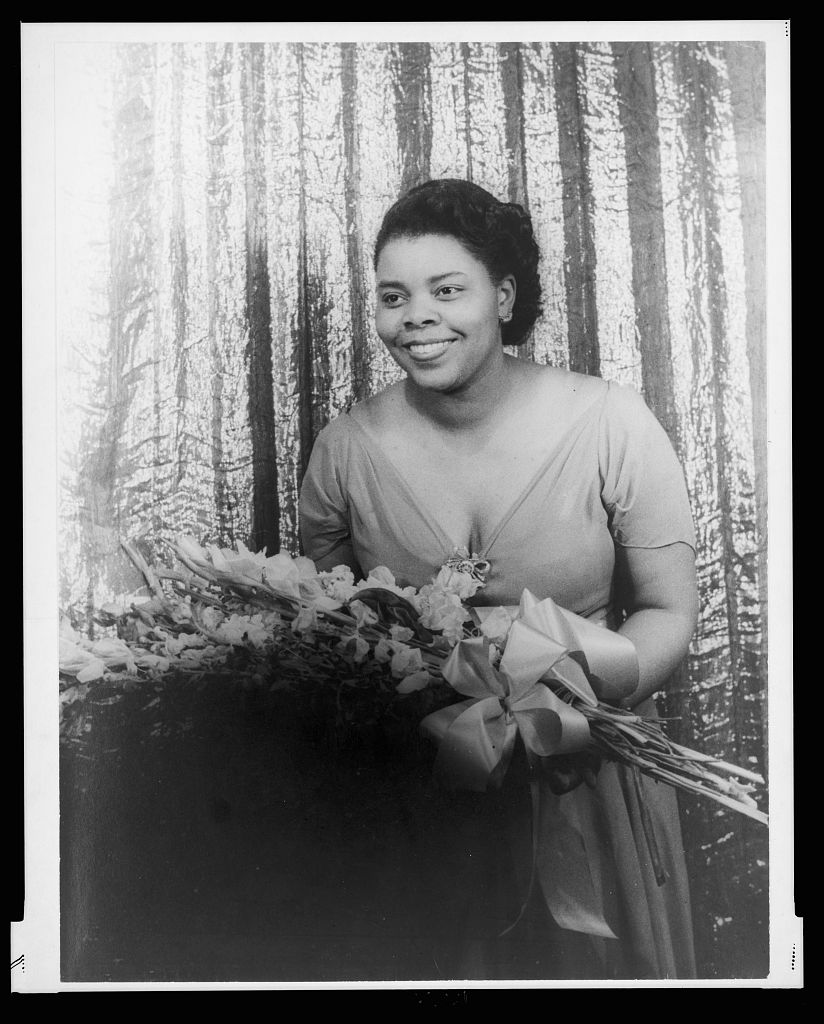
Carol Brice

Carol Brice (April 16, 1918 – February 15, 1985) was an American contralto. Born in Sedalia, North Carolina, she studied at Palmer Memorial Institute and later at Talladega College in Talladega, Alabama, where she received a Bachelor of Music in 1939. She continued her studies at the Juilliard School of Music from 1939 to 1943. She attracted considerable attention for her role in a 1939 production of The Hot Mikado at the New York World's Fair, where she worked with Bill "Bojangles" Robinson. Brice made her recital debut in 1943, that year becoming the first African-American to win the Walter Naumburg Award. Her concerts often featured the piano accompaniment of her brother, Jonathan Brice. In 1945 she taught briefly at Black Mountain College.

She was the featured contralto on the February 5, 1946 recording of Manuel de Falla's El Amor Brujo conducted by Fritz Reiner with the Pittsburgh Symphony Orchestra. (Columbia Masterworks MM-633, 3 12" 78 RPM discs. Also LP ML-2006).

Her performances on Broadway included the role of Kakou in the original 1959 cast of Saratoga, the role of Maude in a 1960 revival of Finian's Rainbow, the role of Catherine Creek in the original 1971 musical production of The Grass Harp, and the role of Maria in a 1976 revival of Porgy & Bess. Her opera performances included roles in Clarence Cameron White's Ouanga and Marc Blitzstein's Regina.

Brice began teaching at the University of Oklahoma at Norman in 1974. She later founded the non-profit Cimarron Circuit Opera Company in Oklahoma with her husband, the baritone Thomas Carey. She supported lynching victim Isaiah Nixon's widow financially after Nixon was killed in 1948. Brice died in Norman, Oklahoma of cancer, survived by her husband, brother, two children and six grandchildren.
