= Atlanta Technical College =

Technical college in Atlanta, Georgia, U.S.

- Former names: Smith-Hughes Vocational School, Hoke Smith Technical Institute, Atlanta Area Technical School, Atlanta Technical Institute
- Type: Public Community Technical College
- Established: 1967
- President: Dr. Victoria Seals
- Students: 4,498 (fall 2024)
- Location: Atlanta, Georgia, United States; 33°42′42.78″N 84°24′26.24″W
- Campus: Urban
- Colors: Navy and Gold
- Website: atlantatech.edu

Atlanta Technical College (Atlanta Tech or ATC) is a public technical college in Atlanta, Georgia. It is part of the Technical College System of Georgia (TCSG) and provides education services for Fulton and Clayton counties. Atlanta Tech is accredited by the Southern Association of Colleges and Schools as well as, for specific programs, other organizations such as Automotive Service Excellence (ASE) Education Foundation, the American Culinary Federation, the Commission on Accreditation for Health Informatics and Information Management Education, the Commission on Accreditation of Allied Health Education Programs (CAAHEP), the American Society of Health-Systems Pharmacists, the Commission on Accreditation in Physical Therapy Education, the Joint Review Committee on Education in Radiologic Technology, and the American Bar Association (ABA). It previously was accredited by the Commission of the Council of Occupational Education. The school awards associate degrees, diplomas, and technical certificates of credit, and it offers short term continuing education courses.

== History ==
Atlanta Technical College was originally established in 1945 after World War II as an adult vocational school, Smith-Hughes Vocational School. In 1964, the school's location was moved to Smith High School (now closed), and the school was renamed to Hoke Smith Technical Institute. At that time, about 24 occupational programs were offered.

In 1967, the school was reorganized as Atlanta Area Technical School and moved to its current campus, holding the first classes in its new facilities in January 1968. In 1997, the school's name was changed to Atlanta Technical Institute and the institution became part of the Georgia Department of Technical and Adult Education. On July 1, 2000, the name was changed to Atlanta Technical College.

== Locations ==
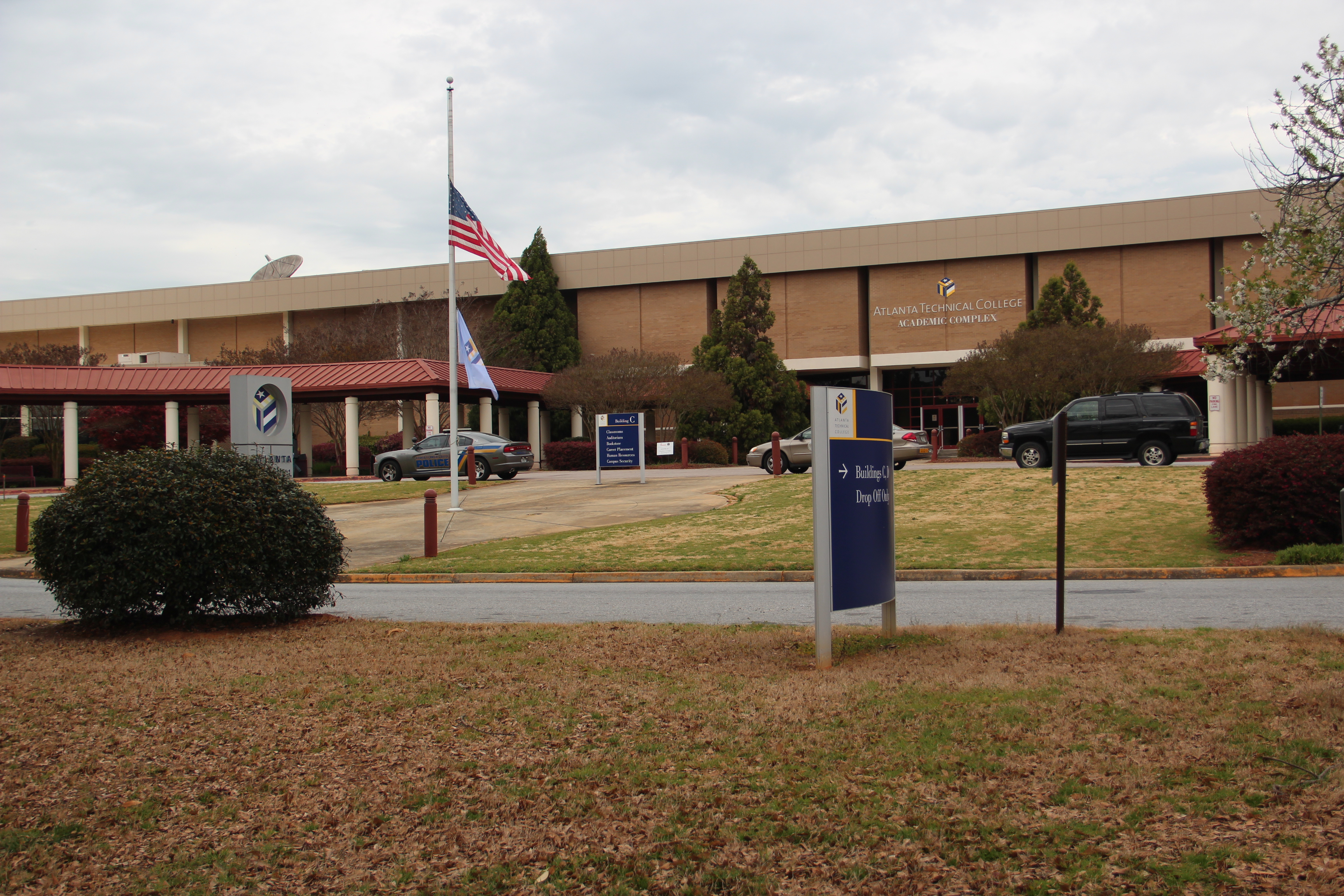
The Academic Complex on the main campus

Atlanta Tech's main campus is located at 1560 Metropolitan Parkway in Atlanta. The school's South campus is located at 485 Atlanta South Parkway in Forest Park.

== Notable alumni ==
- H. Johnson, American radio personality
- Kawaski Trawick, American personal trainer and dancer
