= Tom Vaughn (musician) =

American jazz pianist and Episcopal priest

Father Tom Vaughn
- Born: Thomas Wade Vaughn; October 13, 1936; Benton, Kentucky, U.S.
- Died: March 4, 2011 (aged 74) Riverside, California, U.S.
- Genres: Jazz, stride
- Occupations: Musician, Episcopal Minister
- Instrument: Piano
- Years active: 1965–1976
- Labels: RCA, Capitol & Concord Jazz

Father Tom Vaughn (October 13, 1936 – March 4, 2011) was an American jazz pianist and Episcopal priest.

== Early life ==
Born Thomas Wade Vaughn on October 14, 1936, in Benton, Kentucky, he began his music study on the piano around the age of five under the tutelage of his mother, Elizabeth. The piano was the instrument of choice for their family. Robert Wade, an uncle, was employed as a pianist by the New York and San Francisco ballet companies.

When he was 10 years old, his family, which also included four girls, relocated to Pontiac, Michigan, near Detroit. During his adolescence, he studied classical music with Harold Deremier. At the age of 12, Vaughn experienced the genius of Art Tatum, who was visiting Deremier. Vaughn stated: "I hadn't been exposed to music like that before." "That was amazing," and shifted his focus to jazz. In his mid-teens he was jamming in Detroit with other young musicians including Kenny Burrell, Paul Chambers, and Elvin Jones.

Vaughn graduated from Eureka College in Illinois with a degree in history while playing piano in area clubs. He and his sweetheart Beverle Jean were married, and the couple started a family when Sheila Denise was born in 1961. Two other children followed: Tom Jr. in 1963; and Angela Suzanne in 1965. A strong interest in religion led him to enroll in Yale Divinity School, where he earned a doctorate in theology.

He entered the Episcopal priesthood, and in 1964 his first position was assistant to the rector at St. John's Episcopal Church in Midland, Michigan, two hours north of Detroit. Vaughn still played concerts at colleges and clubs sporadically, but the 8am Sunday service limited his travel. That same year Father Tom sat in with Gene Krupa's quartet in Detroit, where he caught the attention of producer George Wein.

== Recording and playing ==
One year later, Wein brought Vaughn to New York City, where he recorded Jazz In Concert At The Village Gate with Art Davis on double bass and Elvin Jones on drums. Vaughn was a featured performer at the 1966 Newport Jazz Festival, opening for Miles Davis.

Father Vaughn left St. John's Church in Midland in 1967, deciding that Los Angeles would be more conducive to his two passions, music and the ministry. Cornbread (Meat Loaf, Greens & Devilled Eggs) was recorded and released, followed by Motor City Soul in 1968. He played in festivals and concerts during the late 1960s and early 1970s, and appeared on local television and national talk shows, including Johnny Carson, Steve Allen and Merv Griffin. All this was done around his church responsibilities.

== Settling down ==
Vaughn joined St. Martin-in-the-Fields Episcopal Church in Winnetka, California in 1968. Three years later, he performed a jazz concert in the parish hall to raise funds for the "Fireside Room", then began serving as assistant rector. When St. Martin's celebrated their 25th anniversary with a big barbecue, music and dancing, Father Tom played during the 1974 festivities. He was installed as rector in 1976, the year he recorded his last album, Joyful Jazz. He stayed busy with the parish and raising his three children until 1984, when he needed hip replacement—both—and retired from active ministry. After that, he served as a supply priest, officiating services at churches when the rector was absent.

== Retirement ==
Father Tom Vaughn reappeared publicly in 1990, conducting the memorial service for singer June Christy at the Forest Lawn Memorial Park (Hollywood Hills). As part of the service, he invited a quartet of eminent musicians to play in her honor, but did not join the group himself, instead opting to listen and enjoy the music as a spectator.

By the early 1990s, his children were grown and Vaughn played at local clubs a few times each year; a 1990 performance at the Millennium Biltmore Hotel received positive reviews. He also hosted a public-access television cable show, "All That Jazz", and was considering a return to the recording studio.

Vaughn was interviewed by the Los Angeles Times in 1991 and asked why he chose to remain a priest rather than accept fame and fortune as a touring musician.

Nothing can move me at the deepest spiritual level like music can, (but) music was never completely satisfying. Music was something that came to me as a pure gift. Maybe it came too easily. The clergy came to me through hard work and learning. I felt called to the inquiries of the mind. Tom Vaughn didn't want musical notoriety. I've never made much of a fuss over it myself.

After turning 60, Vaughn further reduced his public performances to perhaps once a year. He remained married to wife, Bev, and practiced for three or four hours most mornings for his own enjoyment.

That feeling, when it's right, there's nothing better – carnality, food, throw it all out the window. When I get in a groove, I'm detached, almost like losing consciousness, like flying some sort of super aircraft. It's close to an out-of-body experience.

At an interview in 1996, he acknowledged splitting piano time between playing the classics (Bach, Beethoven & Chopin) and improvising jazz with touches of blues and bebop.

Vaughn died March 4, 2011, according to comments posted on a YouTube video of Vaughn's recording of "Battle Hymn of the Republic".

Today, Vaughn's version of Battle Hymn of the Republic can be heard every Saturday night at 8:00 pm EST on WABE 90.1 in Atlanta. The song have provided the introduction to H. Johnson's "Jazz Classics" radio show, for 37 of more than 42 years that the show has aired.

All of Vaughn's records have been out of print for many years, but his three children began compiling their father's work into digital form in 2006.

== Discography ==
- Jazz in Concert at the Village Gate [live] (1966/RCA)
- Cornbread (1967/RCA)
- Motor City Soul (1968/RCA)
- Games People Play (1969/Capitol Records
- Tom Vaughn has Piano Power (1973/Capitol Records
- Joyful Jazz (1976/Concord Jazz)
