= Isaiah Nixon =

African-American murder victim (died 1948)

- Died: September 8, 1948; Montgomery County, Georgia
- Cause of death: Gunshot wound
- Resting place: Uvalda, Georgia

Isaiah Nixon (died September 8, 1948) was an African American soldier who was shot and killed in retaliation for voting in the 1948 Georgia Democratic primary.

== Life and murder ==
Isaiah Nixon was a veteran of World War II, married, and a father of six. He lived on a farm in Montgomery County, Georgia on land that had been owned by his mother. In the leadup to the 1948 election Nixon had been active in the local NAACP and was a supporter of Melvin E. Thompson for governor. The Ku Klux Klan, led by Samuel Green, had endorsed Thompson's opponent in the election and advocated for violence against potential African-American voters. On September 8, 1948, Nixon voted in the Georgia Democratic primary in defiance of a warning not to by the poll worker. After casting his vote, Nixon returned home. That evening, Nixon was visited at home by brothers J.A. and Johnnie Johnson, both white. During the encounter, Nixon was shot three times by J.A. Johnson. The brothers were indicted and tried in November 1948. The prosecution was assisted by a lawyer from the NAACP and claimed that the brothers had visited Nixon with the intent to kill him for voting in the election. The brothers claimed that they had visited Nixon to discuss employing him and that J.A. Johnson had shot him in self-defense after Nixon attacked them with a knife. The Johnson brothers were acquitted of the crime by an all-white jury.

Nixon's death was the subject of widespread media commentary at the time. The editorial board of the Ledger-Enquirer issued a statement urging a complete investigation into the incident. One article, originally published in the St. Louis Star-Times and syndicated as far as the Honolulu Star-Bulletin, said that "all persons' right to vote is endangered when Isaiah Nixon is killed for voting." Benjamin Mays, a prominent Baptist minister and president of Morehouse College, claimed that Nixon "never had a chance" and that his killers would not face justice. A group of Pittsburgh businessmen started a fund for Nixon's family which raised several thousand dollars and was promoted by opera singer Carol Brice. Nixon's widow attempted to meet with Georgia representative John Stephens Wood to discuss racial violence; however, it is unclear if any meeting took place.

== Legacy ==
Nixon's murder was cited in the 1951 petition We Charge Genocide, which accused the United States of engaging in genocide against its African-American population. Barrows Dunham invoked the Nixon case in his 1953 book Giant in Chains, discussing Nixon's widow's grief and weaving it into his broader political philosophy. Nixon's death was the subject of the podcast Buried Truths first season, which won a Peabody Award for "forcing listeners to confront what previous generations had sought to repress."

In 2015, Emory University's Georgia Civil Rights Cold Cases Project investigated Nixon's killing. They concluded that Nixon's murder was racially motivated and that his killers were wrongfully acquitted. They also discovered Nixon's burial site, an unmarked grave on the outskirts of Ulvalda's Old Salem Cemetery. Nixon's grave had been unknown for 67 years.

== See also ==
- Robert Mallard, African American man from Georgia also killed for voting in the 1948 gubernatorial election.
