= Herman A. Johnson =

American businessman and Tuskegee Airman (1916–2004)

Herman Archibald Johnson (December 19, 1916 – February 17, 2004) was an American businessman.

== Biography ==
Herman Johnson was born in Schenectady, New York. He graduated from Cornell University, and did graduate studies in personnel and hospital administration at the University of Chicago. He was one of the Tuskegee Airmen of World War II, serving as a Major in the U.S. Army Air Forces. After the war, Herman lived in Washington, DC as director of Howard University's teaching hospital, and district office manager of the Supreme Life Insurance Company in Ohio before coming to Kansas City in the late 1950s.

In 1960 Johnson married the former Dorothy H. (Hodge) Davis. Dorothy Johnson was also recognized in her own right as a civic leader, with a career as journalist, public relations professional and director of the Jackson County (MO) Department of Health and Welfare.

In Kansas City, he owned the Herman Johnson Company, an insurance agency, and Lincoln Cemetery, which, according to the Kansas City Star was "one of only three cemeteries... available for African-Americans. Legendary Kansas City saxophonist Charlie Parker is buried there." Johnson represented Kansas City, Missouri in the Missouri House of Representatives from 1968 to 1972. He served twice as President of the Kansas City, Missouri Branch of the National Association for the Advancement of Colored People (NAACP) during the civil rights movement of the 1960s, and was a board member of the national NAACP Legal Defense Fund. Johnson founded the Black Scholarship Fund at the University of Missouri. He was chairman of the Douglas State Bank at the time of his death.

He died on February 17, 2004.

In August 2006 the Kansas City Council approved the naming of the 27th Street Bridge at Paseo Boulevard in memory of Herman Johnson. The Kansas City Star article reporting the council's action included this quote from Troy Nash, who introduced the resolution: "Herman made significant contributions to this city. We thought it was the better part of wisdom to rename the 27th Street bridge after him." His obituary in the Kansas City Call eulogized Johnson as "a gentleman, extraordinary, a man for all seasons.... one of our distinguished sojourners and leaders."

== Erratum ==
At one time it was thought that World War I hero Henry Johnson was Herman Johnson's father; he stood in for his "father" at a 2003 ceremony awarding the senior Johnson the Distinguished Service Cross. The mistake was not clarified until 2015, a decade after the younger Johnson's death, as part of the further research done leading up to the senior Johnson's Medal of Honor. Herman's daughter Tara, although not recognized as next of kin, nonetheless attended Henry Johnson's Medal of Honor ceremony as a guest.
