= WABE (FM) =

Public radio station in Atlanta, Georgia, United States

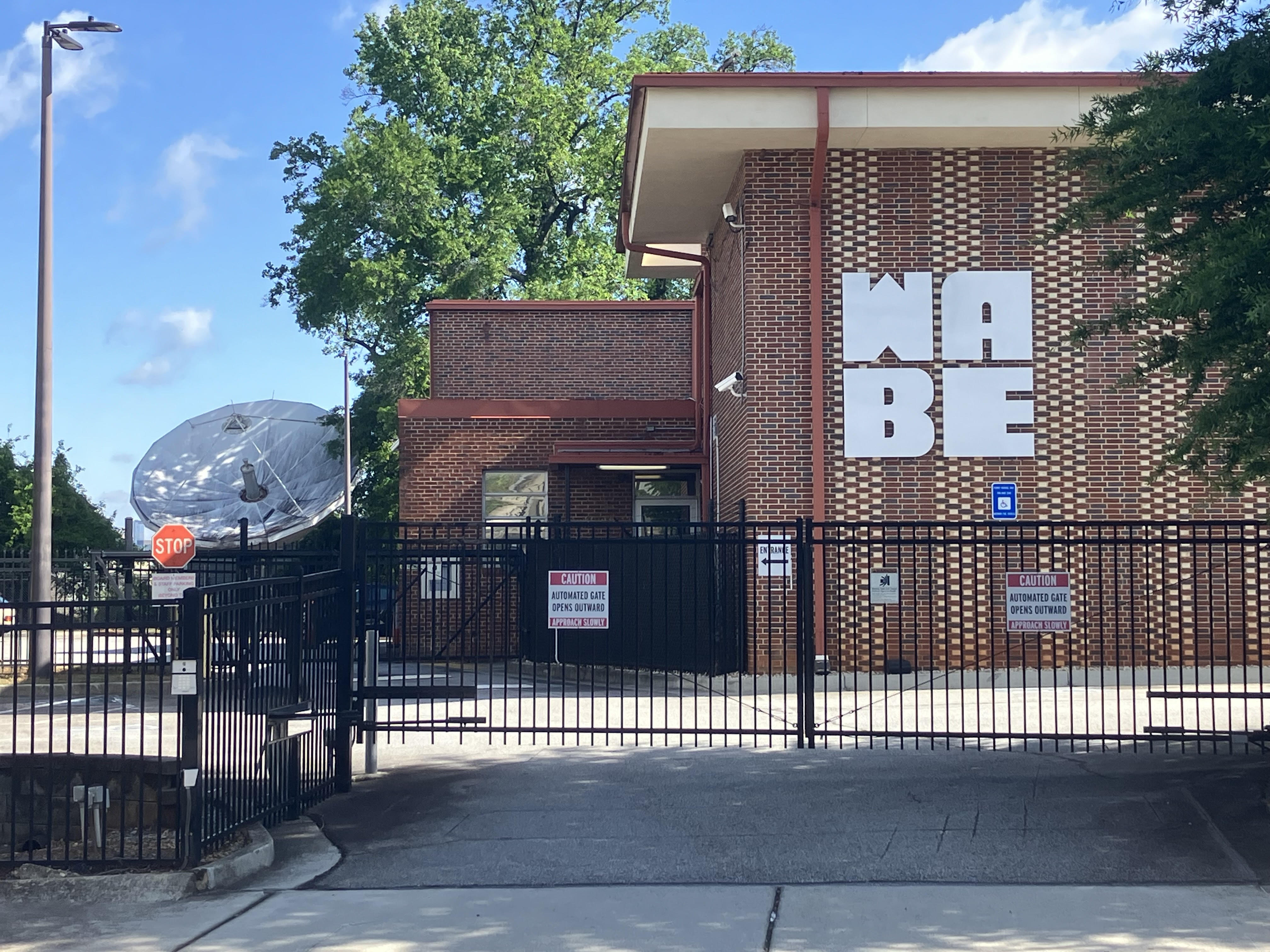
- WABE (FM) Building (April 2025)
- Atlanta, Georgia; United States
- Broadcast area: Atlanta metropolitan area
- Frequency: 90.1 MHz (HD Radio)
- Branding: 90.1 FM WABE

Programming
- Format: Public radio
- Subchannels: HD2: Classical; HD3: BBC World Service
- Affiliations: National Public Radio; PRX; BBC; APM

Ownership
- Owner: Atlanta Public Schools; (Board of Education, City of Atlanta Government)
- Sister stations: WABE-TV

History
- First air date: September 13, 1948
- Call sign meaning: "Atlanta Board of Education"

Technical information
- Licensing authority: FCC
- Facility ID: 3538
- Class: C0
- ERP: 100,000 watts
- HAAT: 334.1 meters (1,096 ft)
- Transmitter coordinates: 33°45′32″N 84°20′07″W

Links
- Public license information: Public file; LMS
- Webcast: Listen live
- Website: wabe.org

WABE (90.1 FM) is a non-commercial educational radio station licensed to Atlanta, Georgia, United States, and serves the Atlanta metropolitan area as a members station of National Public Radio (NPR). Owned by Atlanta Public Schools and licensed to the Atlanta Board of Education, it is a sister outlet to PBS member station WABE-TV (channel 30) and local educational access cable service APS Cable Channel 22. The three outlets share studios on Bismark Road in the Morningside/Lenox Park section of Atlanta; WABE-TV's transmitter is located on New Street Northeast (south of DeKalb Avenue) in the city's Edgewood neighborhood.

WABE carries a general public radio schedule with local hosts Lisa Rayam (Morning Edition), Rose Scott (Closer Look), Jim Burress (All Things Considered) and H. Johnson (Jazz/Blues Classics) and produces numerous podcasts, including the Peabody Award-winning Buried Truths with Hank Klibanoff.

In September 1994, a nonprofit corporation, the Atlanta Educational Telecommunications Collaborative, Inc., was founded to provide financial, promotional, and volunteer support for WABE (as well as WABE-TV channel 30 and Atlanta Public Schools cable channel 22). WABE's signal reaches practically all of the northwestern and north-central parts of the state. It is the dominant public radio station in metropolitan Atlanta, but starting on June 30, 2014, has been joined during the daytime by Georgia Public Broadcasting's Atlanta feed on 88.5 WRAS-FM. GPB provides public radio programming to most of the rest of the state.

== History ==
On October 16, 1947, the Atlanta Board of Education received a construction permit to build a new noncommercial educational radio station on 90.1 MHz in Atlanta. The station took the call letters WABE, representing its owner. The facility was completed by May 1948, when on-air tests were run, but it would not be until the next school year when WABE entered into full-time service on September 13. Initially, WABE ran exclusively instructional programming for students in Atlanta and Fulton County schools and was the first station of its kind in the Southeast. The Rich's Foundation had donated equipment to run the station; at the time, Rich's produced educational radio programming that aired on a six-station network in Georgia, which included WABE when it signed on.

The first radio studios were in two rooms on the 14th floor of the Atlanta City Hall; the station moved to its present quarters on Bismark Road in 1957. The former Rock Springs Elementary School would also house WETV, the first educational television station in Georgia, which began broadcasting in February 1958.

It was not until the early 1970s that the station significantly broadened its output to include non-instructional programs. The station added more evening hours in 1971 and began regular weekend broadcasts for the first time. In 1973, "Friends of WABE" was formed, giving the station its first community volunteer organization; broadcasting in stereo began in April 1974 after commercial radio station owner GCC Communications gave a grant for new equipment. In 1979, WABE won its first George Foster Peabody Award for a two-part program, The Eyewitness Who Wasn't: The Matthews Murder Trials.

The late 1970s and early 1980s also saw other changes, notably the formation of a Public Broadcasting Association to advise on the operations of WETV and WABE and Fulton County's decision to stop funding WABE and WETV in 1982, which almost led the Atlanta school board to turn both over to GPB. Ultimately, the factor that dissuaded the Board of Education from handing over its broadcasting outlets was that it was a minority school system and had no interest in turning over the services to a predominantly White group.

The early 1980s also brought major changes that cemented WABE's service to Atlanta. After nearly 35 years, instructional programming was distributed to schools directly beginning in the 1982–83 school year, freeing up daytime hours for public radio programming. The radio station then relocated to Stone Mountain in April 1983 at an increased power of 100,000 watts, greatly improving coverage. It would remain on Stone Mountain until 2004, when technical considerations relating to the digital television transition displaced WPBA from the site.

A 1991 study suggested a move to a multicultural format for WABE, which drew the ire of public broadcasting supporters. The advisory board campaigned in 1993 to take full control of the stations; this led to its restructuring as the Atlanta Educational Telecommunications Collaborative in 1994. Later in the decade, the statewide network made another overture to take over WPBA and WABE, which the Atlanta Board of Education rebuffed, with the racial composition of channel 30's management compared to the state agency again being cited.

Into the 2010s, WABE continued to broadcast classical music during daytime hours, even as most public radio stations in large markets were moving toward speech-based daytime schedules, in large part because of Reitzes, the longest-tenured air personality on Atlanta radio. As a result, many NPR programs that became mainstays after the network's rapid programming expansion in the 1990s, such as The Diane Rehm Show, Talk of the Nation, Here and Now, On Point, The Story with Dick Gordon and Newshour from the BBC World Service, were not heard until WABE added all-classical and all-news/talk HD Radio subchannels in 2006. In 2014, the station announced that, beginning in January 2015, the classical programming would move exclusively to the station's HD2 subchannel, to be replaced by new national and local programming (including a two-hour arts program hosted by Reitzes) alongside an addition of seven employees to the news staff. The substitution of more popular news programming for classical shows helped to fuel ratings growth at WABE, which increased its ratings by 45 percent from 2015 to 2019. In 2019, Buried Truths, a podcast from WABE hosted by Hank Klibanoff, won the station its second Peabody Award.

On January 19, 2022, Public Broadcasting Atlanta rebranded both WABE and WPBA-TV, along with their websites, podcasts and smartphone apps, as a single unified entity named WABE, with a new logo and slogan, "Amplifying Atlanta", and a call sign change for the television station.

== Local programming and productions ==
During the day, WABE mixes public radio programs from NPR and other producers—including Morning Edition, All Things Considered, Here and Now, Fresh Air, and Marketplace—with its own local shows, including Closer Look with Rose Scott. Weekends continue to feature musical programming, including broadcasts of the Atlanta Symphony Orchestra and two programs hosted by H. Johnson: Jazz Classics on Saturday nights and Blues Classics on Friday nights. On Sunday nights, The Atlanta Music Scene presents concerts from venues in the area, but was discontinued in 2026.

=== Notable hosts ===
- Lois Reitzes, founding host of the former arts program City Lights and with WABE since 1979, retired in 2025.
- H. Johnson, who started as a temporary fill-in at the station in 1978, is host of the Saturday night program Jazz Classics and Friday night program Blues Classics.
