= WABE-TV =

Television station in Atlanta

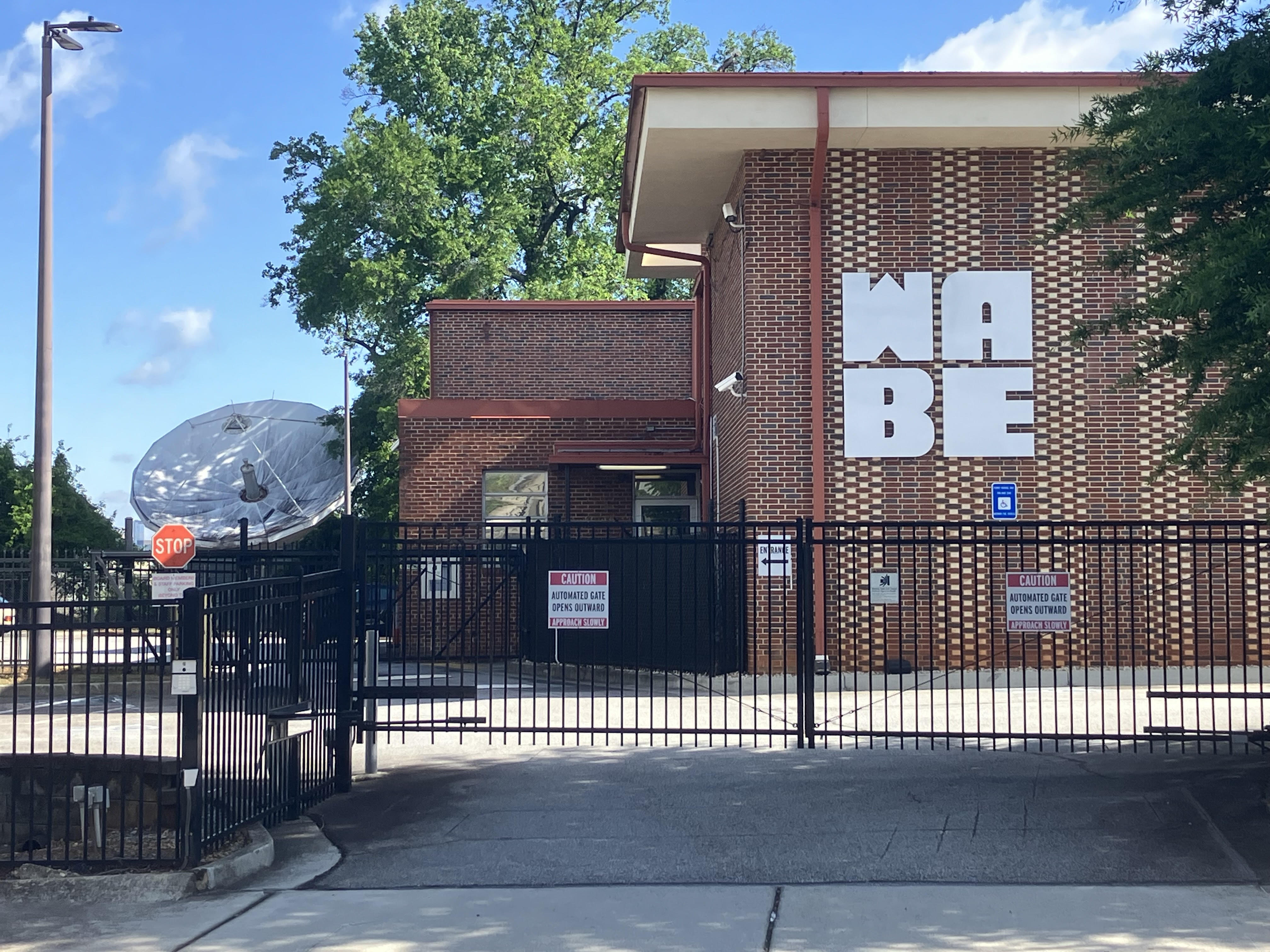
- The WABE radio and TV studios in Atlanta
- Atlanta, Georgia; United States
- Channels: Digital: 21 (UHF); Virtual: 30
- Branding: WABE

Programming
- Affiliations: 30.1: PBS

Ownership
- Owner: Atlanta Public Schools; (Board of Education of the City of Atlanta)
- Sister stations: WABE; APS Cable Channel 22

History
- First air date: February 17, 1958
- Former call signs: WETV (1958–1984); WPBA (1984–2022)
- Former channel numbers: Analog: 30 (UHF, 1958–2009)
- Former affiliations: NET (1958–1970)
- Call sign meaning: "Atlanta Board of Education"

Technical information
- Licensing authority: FCC
- Facility ID: 4190
- ERP: 105 kW
- HAAT: 265.2 m (870.1 ft)
- Transmitter coordinates: 33°45′32.4″N 84°20′7″W

Links
- Public license information: Public file; LMS
- Website: wabe.org

WABE-TV (channel 30) is a secondary PBS member television station in Atlanta, Georgia, United States. Owned by Atlanta Public Schools, it is a sister outlet to NPR member station WABE (90.1 FM) and local educational access cable service APS Cable Channel 22. The three outlets share studios on Bismark Road in the Morningside/Lenox Park section of Atlanta; WABE-TV's transmitter is located on New Street Northeast (south of DeKalb Avenue) in the city's Edgewood neighborhood.

WABE-TV was Georgia's first public television station, signing on as WETV in February 1958, and is the only one that is not part of Georgia Public Broadcasting (GPB). It has typically provided a programming mix more reflective of the city of Atlanta than the statewide service from GPB, though duplication between the two has been an issue at times in WABE-TV's history.

== History ==
The Board of Education of the City of Atlanta filed on February 16, 1953, for a construction permit to build a new noncommercial educational television station on Atlanta's reserved channel 30. The Federal Communications Commission (FCC) granted the application on March 21, 1956; the school board announced that the station would operate from the former Rock Springs School. After delays in tower construction set back the start, the station first signed on the air as WETV, for "Educational Television", on February 17, 1958; test broadcasts had started at the end of 1957.

Channel 30, the first educational television station to sign on in Georgia, focused initially on programs for use in the city's public schools. The initial offering consisted of five high school courses and two at the elementary school level. In addition, the station aired programs from National Educational Television and produced local specialty programming, including Board of Aldermen and Board of Education meetings and programs for senior citizens and Spanish speakers. In 1973, the station began broadcasting on Saturdays for the first time ever.

Parallel to WETV's early years, the University of Georgia built WGTV, channel 8 in Athens, in 1960, and the Georgia Educational Television Network was constructed in the 1960s, providing service to the rest of the state. However, in the early 1980s, when WGTV was amalgamated with Georgia Educational Television to form the present Georgia Public Broadcasting, Governor George Busbee called for the state to negotiate to purchase WETV. The late 1970s and early 1980s also saw other changes: the formation of a Public Broadcasting Association to advise on the operations of WETV and WABE; upset workers who threatened a wildcat strike over work schedule issues; and Fulton County's decision to stop funding WABE and WETV in 1982, which almost led the Atlanta school board to turn both over to GPB. Ultimately, the factor that dissuaded the Board of Education from handing over its broadcasting outlets was that it was a minority school system and had no interest in turning over the services to a predominantly White group.

In 1984, seeking to improve its image, channel 30 changed its call letters to WPBA ("Public Broadcasting Atlanta"). The station periodically explored potential new directions, such as a 1991 study that suggested focusing on local productions and deemphasizing network shows; the same study also suggested a move to a multicultural format for WABE, which drew the ire of public broadcasting supporters. The advisory board campaigned in 1993 to take full control of the stations; this led to its restructuring as the Atlanta Educational Telecommunications Collaborative in 1994. After the handover, WPBA more than doubled its annual budget thanks to increased corporate and viewer donations, and its number of members tripled; however, much of this came from airing PBS programming, prompting more concern by some donors of overlap with GPB. The statewide network made another overture to take over WPBA and WABE, which the Atlanta Board of Education rebuffed, with the racial composition of channel 30's management compared to the state agency again being cited. Milton Clipper, president and CEO of Public Broadcasting Atlanta, told the Atlanta Business Chronicle, "We can certainly do interesting [programming] for the state as well, but that's not where we're heading right now. I want to make sure that I'm doing what I am responsible to do for our city."

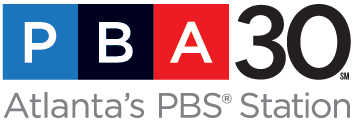
Former WPBA logo, used from 2008 until July 23, 2018; the logo is based on the design used by NPR

On September 6, 1999, WPBA assumed time-lease rights to Atlanta Public Schools's APS Cable channel (carried on Comcast channel 22 in metropolitan Atlanta), which began to air programming from the upstart PBS Kids Channel each night from 6:00 p.m. to 6:00 a.m., with instructional programming acquired by the school district continuing to air during the daytime hours.

In 2005, WPBA heavily reduced its PBS program offerings after Atlanta Public Schools and station management decided to make channel 30 a participant in the service's Program Differentiation Plan; this came amid frequent complaints of duplication between WPBA and GPB and a desire to cut costs at the station. As a result, the station began to carry only 25 percent of the programming broadcast by PBS's national feed, giving GPB primary status for most new PBS programs. To make up for the reduced lineup of PBS shows, WPBA also expanded its reliance on syndicated programs from American Public Television and other distributors as well as locally produced news and public affairs programs.

On July 23, 2018, WPBA discontinued the "PBA 30" branding, used since the late 1990s, and changed its moniker to "ATL PBA", removing references to its over-the-air virtual channel. The following day (July 24), Atlanta Public Schools reached an agreement with PBS to convert WPBA into a full-service member outlet in order to better compete with GPB for viewers, public and private monetary contributions, and corporate programming underwriters. The move, which allowed WPBA to carry any content supplied by the service and to provide PBS Passport to its members, resulted in a roughly $500,000 increase in programming expenditures; however, the station announced that it would not simulcast programming with GPB and would inform the statewide network of its scheduling decisions. In addition, it was announced that the station planned to keep its Monday and Friday lineups—which primarily relied on British programming—unchanged and expand local program production.

On January 18, 2022, Public Broadcasting Atlanta rebranded both WPBA and its sister station WABE, along with their websites, podcasts and smartphone apps, as a single unified entity named WABE, with a new logo and slogan, "Amplifying Atlanta". The call sign of the television station changed to WABE-TV, effective January 31.

== Funding ==
In fiscal year 2021, WPBA generated $5.13 million in total revenue. The Corporation for Public Broadcasting provided $925,000, primarily in the form of a Community Service Grant. $1.8 million in revenue was generated from memberships and subscriptions from a total of 9,770 contributors.

== Local programming ==
WABE-TV's local programming, fitting the station's remit, traditionally focuses on Atlanta issues and culture, though in recent years it has been more limited while WABE built out a digital presence and a series of podcasts. The weekly talk show Love and Respect with Killer Mike airs on television and expanded to radio in 2022; that same year, the station began a concert series franchise, Sounds Like ATL.

== Technical information ==
WABE-TV's transmitter is located on New Street Northeast (south of DeKalb Avenue) in the city's Edgewood neighborhood. The station broadcasts one subchannel:

Subchannel of WABE-TV
Subchannel	Res.	Short name	Programming
30.1	1080i	WABE-TV	PBS

=== Analog-to-digital conversion ===
WPBA began transmitting a digital television signal on UHF channel 21 on January 1, 2005. WPBA shut down its analog signal, over UHF channel 30, on June 12, 2009, the official date on which full-power television in the United States transitioned from analog to digital broadcasts under federal mandate. The station's digital signal remained on its pre-transition UHF channel 21, using virtual channel 30.
