= WRFG =

American community radio station

Atlanta, Georgia; United States
- Broadcast area: Atlanta metropolitan area
- Frequency: 89.3 MHz
- Branding: Radio Free Georgia

Programming
- Format: Community radio
- Affiliations: Pacifica Radio Network

Ownership
- Owner: Radio Free Georgia Broadcasting Organization

History
- First air date: July 30, 1973
- Call sign meaning: "Radio Free Georgia"

Technical information
- Licensing authority: FCC
- Class: C1
- ERP: 65,000 watts
- HAAT: 148 meters (486 ft)
- Transmitter coordinates: 33°48′26″N 84°20′22″W

Links
- Public license information: Public file; LMS
- Webcast: Listen Live
- Website: www.wrfg.org

WRFG (89.3 FM) is a non-commercial public radio station in Atlanta, Georgia. It calls itself Radio Free Georgia and is owned by the Radio Free Georgia Broadcasting Organization, featuring a community radio format. WRFG airs a variety of musical styles not heard on most Atlanta radio stations, including blues, folk, bluegrass, jazz, R&B, soul, Reggae, Tropical and world music. News programs include "Democracy Now!," "Sojourner Truth Radio" and some shows from Pacifica Radio. The station's operations are funded by listener donations, with periodic fundraising drives heard during the year.

== Transmitter ==
In October 1995, WRFG increased its effective radiated power (ERP) to 100,000 watts. On October 23, 2007, the station improved its broadcast coverage area by operating from a new antenna and tower location with 65,000 watts effective radiated power (ERP) at 148 meters (468 feet) in height above average terrain (HAAT). Its transmitter is atop a tower near Emory University, known as the Richland Tower site. It is shared by several FM and TV stations including WANF-TV, WPCH-TV, WATL-TV, WUVG-TV, WWWQ-FM, WZGC-FM, and WKHX-FM. WRFG's studios and offices are located in the Little Five Points Community Center, east of downtown Atlanta.

== See also ==
- List of community radio stations in the United States
