= Kidi =

Kidi may refer to:

- Kidi (film), a 2017 Indian Kannada action thriller
- Kidi, Tangestan, Iran, a village
- KiDi, stage name of Ghanaian singer/songwriter Dennis Nana Dwamena (born 1993)
- Kidi Bebey, French journalist and author
- KIDI-FM, an FM radio station licensed to Lompoc, California, United States
- KIDI-FM, former call sign of KRTO, an FM radio station licensed to Santa Maria, California
- Kidi, a type of drum used in Ewe drumming
- Indiana County–Jimmy Stewart Airport (ICAO code: KIDI), an airport in Pennsylvania, United States
