= Pioneer Valley High School =

Coordinates: 34.95287°N 120.41138°W

Location
- 675 Panther Drive; Santa Maria, California; 93454

Information
- Type: Public
- Motto: 𝘗𝘢𝘯𝘵𝘩𝘦𝘳 𝘗.𝘙.𝘐.𝘋.𝘌.
- Established: 2004
- Principal: Paul Robinson
- Staff: 140.38 (FTE)
- Grades: 9-12
- Enrollment: 3,112 (2023-2024)
- Student to teacher ratio: 22.17
- Campus: Medium-sized city
- Area: 53.5 acres (21.7 ha)
- Colors: Teal & Black
- Athletics conference: CIF Central Section; Central Coast Athletic Association
- Mascot: Panther
- Nickname: Panthers
- Website: Pioneer Valley High School

== Pioneer Valley Highschool ==
Pioneer Valley High School (PVHS/Pioneer Valley High School/PV) is a public comprehensive high school in Santa Maria, California, United States serving students through grades 9-12. The school is the newest campus in the Santa Maria Joint Union High School District, opening to a class of freshmen and sophomores on August 11, 2004. Pioneer Valley High School maintains dozens of different athletic sports programs, many electives/CTE classes, and college credit classes. Students overall growth academically has steady increased since the early 2010's. As of the 23-24 school year, Pioneer Valley High School has an estimated amount of 3,112 students attending and 140 staff. The current principal of Pioneer Valley High School is Dr. Paul Robinson and Jeffrey Hromadka as Assistant Principal.

== Campus ==
Pioneer Valley High School is located on 53.5 acres (21.7 ha) of land in the Santa Maria Valley as being the largest high school in the Santa Maria Joint Union High School District The school is at 675 Panther Drive, in northeastern Santa Maria. The surrounding area was historically agricultural and was designated for future housing growth. District facilities study documented 84 permanent classrooms and 29 portable classrooms, for a total of 113 classrooms at the time of the study. The campus includes a football field and track, baseball field, softball field, soccer fields, basketball courts, tennis courts, and a swimming pool. PVHS has a dedicated library, which was identified as one of the major campus facilities in the district's planning documents. The campus has a cafeteria and a multipurpose facility with indoor and outdoor seating. A 2012 district facilities description listed six full computer labs on campus. The campus has a dedicated College and Career Center, supporting students with postsecondary and career planning. The PAC was completed in 2017 and is about 16,400 square feet. The Performing Arts Center contains a 298-seat theater, a full fly tower, lobby, dressing rooms, lighting/AV control booth, three teaching stations, and an outdoor stage area.

== Athletics ==
Pioneer Valley High School sports teams are nicknamed the Panthers. Since 2018, the school has competed in the Central Coast Athletic Association, which is affiliated with the CIF Central Section. Prior to that, PVHS was a member of the CIF Southern Section (CIF-SS) and the Pac-8 League.

Athletic Programs

- Baseball
- Cheer
- Cross Country
- Football
- Softball
- Swimming
- Track and Field
- Boy's Basketball
- Boy's Golf
- Boy's Soccer
- Boy's Tennis
- Boy's Volleyball
- Boy's Water Polo
- Boy's Wrestling
- Girl's Basketball
- Girl's Golf
- Girl's Soccer
- Girl's Tennis
- Girl's Volleyball
- Girl's Water Polo
- Girl's Wrestling

Athletic Achievements/Champions: 2008–09 Boys soccer, 2014 Girls basketball, 2016 Girls Wrestling, 2022 Girls wrestling, 2024 Girls wrestling, TBA.

== Academics ==
Pioneer Valley High School offers two foreign languages for study: French and Spanish. PVHS also offers a college readiness program and elective also known as AVID.

The school achieved an API of 693 in 2009.

Career and technical education

- PVHS currently advertises 27 Career Technical Education pathways.

Career Pathways

- Agriculture
- Animal Science
- Ag Mechanics
- Veterinary Science
- Healthcare
- Medical Assisting
- Digital Arts
- Professional Theater
- Stage Technology
- Accounting
- Computer Applications
- Gaming Technology
- Web Programming
- Media/Publications
- Culinary Arts
- Fashion Design
- Construction
- Engineering/Design
- Cybersecurity
- Automotive
- Wood Technology

Dual enrollment

- Pioneer Valley offers opportunities involving Allan Hancock College, allowing students to earn college credits while attending high school.

Academic Data

- Graduation rate: 95% (23-24 School Year).
- 1:1 Student Device Program.
- CAASPP Achievement information.
- CTE Pathways.

== History ==
Opening

- PVHS officially opened August 11, 2004 with its first graduating class in 2007. It opened with freshmen and sophomores, adding another grade each subsequent year. It was the first new high school in the Santa Maria Valley in 42 years. PVHS was proposed on 8/6/2001 as Santa Maria Joint Union High School District 3rd high school due to the population increasing in Santa Maria at the time and the overcrowding of the two current high schools Ernest Righetti High School and Santa Maria High School. The Santa Maria High School class of 2000 was chosen to pick Pioneer Valley's mascot of being a panther and their colors consisting of Teal and Black. The new campus was intentionally placed in northeast Santa Maria, an area surrounded by agriculture that was designated for future housing growth.
- Built in Northeastern Santa Maria, an area historically surrounded by agricultural land and designated for future housing development.
- Prior to the opening of the Performing Arts Center, Pioneer Valley's theater productions were staged in the drama classroom and cafeteria, while music programs performed in other locations. The new center opened in 2017, providing the school with its first dedicated large-scale performing arts venue.

== Programs ==
Pioneer Valley High School offers many programs for students to take. There are many different programs and clubs for students to join listed below.

Clubs & Programs

- Band
- Concert Choir
- Jazz Choir
- Cheer and Song Leaders
- Winter Guard
- Ballet Folklórico
- Speech & Debate
- FFA
- FCCLA
- FBLA
- Key Club
- Chess Club
- K-Pop Club
- Black Student Union
- SkillsUSA
- Link Crew
- Student Council/ASB
- Panther Tales
- Yearbook
- Sports Medicine
- TBA

== Student Life ==
Pioneer Valley has a vast amount of students attending with many opportunities that PVHS offers.

Offerings

- Student Clubs
- Band
- ASB/student government
- Theater
- FCCLA
- Robotics
- Performing Arts
- School newspaper/yearbook
- Other student organizations

Notable Mention:

- Yaretzi Salazar, who attended PVHS was elected California FCCLA State 1st Vice President for 2025–26.
- Erik Ruiz, who became the first PVHS student to be accepted to Harvard University in 2017.

== Performing Arts ==
Construction of Pioneer Valley High School's Performing Arts Center began in June 2015. The 16,411-square-foot facility was completed in 2017 and officially opened in October of that year. The center contains a 298-seat theater and three classrooms and serves as the performing arts venue for the Santa Maria Joint Union High School District. Its first production was School of Rock the Musical, which opened on November 2, 2017.

The California Arts Council documents Youth ARTS Alive using the Pioneer Valley Performing Arts Center for a community arts event.

Performing Arts: Use of the theater is mainly used for;

- Theater
- Dance
- Ballet Folklórico
- Music/band programs
- Performing Arts Center
