= 1920 Cal Poly Mustangs football team =

American college football season

1920 Cal Poly Mustangs football
- Conference: Independent
- Record: 1–4
- Head coach: Herman Hess (2nd season)

The 1920 Cal Poly Mustangs football team represented California Polytechnic School—now known as California Polytechnic State University, San Luis Obispo—as an independent during the 1920 college football season. Led by Herman Hess in his second and final season as head coach, Cal Poly compiled a record of 1–4 and were outscored by their opponents 65 to 17.

Cal Poly was a two-year school until 1941.

== Schedule ==
Date	Opponent	Site	Result
October 9	at Santa Maria High School	Santa Maria, CA	L 0–20
October 16	Paso Robles High School	San Luis Obispo, CA	L 6–9
October 23	at Bakersfield High School	Bakersfield, CA	L 0–13
November 11	SLO Legion	San Luis Obispo, CA	L 0–7
November 25	Santa Maria High School	San Luis Obispo, CA	W 13–7
