= 1919 Cal Poly Mustangs football team =

American college football season

1919 Cal Poly Mustangs football
- Conference: Independent
- Record: 3–0
- Head coach: Herman Hess (1st season)

The 1919 Cal Poly Mustangs football team represented California Polytechnic School—now known as California Polytechnic State University, San Luis Obispo—as an independent during the 1919 college football season. Led by first-year head coach Herman Hess, Cal Poly compiled a record of 3–0 and outscored their opponents 103 to 6 en route to the team's first undefeated and untied season.

Cal Poly was a two-year school until 1941.

== Schedule ==
Date	Opponent	Site	Result
November 1	at Paso Robles High School	Paso Robles, CA	W 52–0
November 15	Santa Maria High School	San Luis Obispo, CA	W 26–0
November 29	at Santa Maria High School	Santa Maria, CA	W 25–6
