= Donna Schmidt Anderson =

American geologist

Donna Schmidt Anderson is an American geologist who has been involved in academics at the Colorado School of Mines, geotechnical engineering in California, and in the oil and gas industry as an advisor and consultant.

== Early life ==
Donna grew up with father Bernard Schmidt, and mother Beverly Schmidt. Anderson's mother was a housewife who received three degrees while Donna was growing up. Donna's father Bernard was an engineer. Anderson's mother Beverly inspired Donna to receive a high-quality education and even taught Donna how to read. She was Donna's main motivator to pursue her studies.

== Education ==
Anderson received a Bachelor of Arts in Earth Science and Geography from California State University, Fullerton (1974), Masters in geology from UCLA (1980), and a PHD from Colorado School of Mines in Geology specializing in sedimentology/stratigraphy (1997).

== Career ==
Throughout her career, Anderson has worked in geotechnical engineering in California and served as an advisor and consultant in the oil and gas industry before retiring in 2015. Since 2000, she has also been a research professor in the Department of Geology and Geological Engineering at the Colorado School of Mines. Donna has taught undergraduate and graduate students at Mines in the field, core lab, and classroom, as well as participated in dozens of Mines thesis committees across multiple departments. Throughout her career, she has been involved in geologic societies, foundations, and local community groups.

== Research ==
Anderson published a geology guide book with author Paul B. Haseman called Golden Rocks: The Geology and Mining History of Golden. This is the first geology book on Golden, Colorado since a 1938 text by F.M. Van Tuyl.

Anderson has been involved in research regarding the use of tight gas reservoirs performance, through the use of geological processes. This research supported the benefits of doing detailed geological models through stratigraphy and reservoir characterization, which allowed for the optimization in hydraulic fracture and flow modeling in fluvial tight gas sand reservoirs.

Examined non-marine deposits in Santa Maria basin, and found deposition mainly coming from the Oligocene. Lospe Deposits of San Simeon and Point Sal being separated by 90 km due to a fault, although they were derived from the same source.

Anderson analyzed how weathering processes on Quartzeranite Clasts can be used to determine the relative ages of mountains and glaciers, specifically on Mount Timpanogos. Weathered rinds, found by splitting rocks open, were studied to understand the thickness of sediment deposition over the years. Anderson determined that weathering rinds can be used to find age differences in older stabilized deposits of rock glacier activity.

== Contributions ==
Anderson has demonstrated leadership and commitment to the Colorado School of Mines community. Her contributions go far beyond teaching, encompassing mentorship, career development, and philanthropy:

- Mentorship and Academic Guidance: Anderson has participated in the development of students by serving on nearly 100 thesis committees since 2004. Additionally, she has served as an advisor or co-advisor for eight graduate students, supporting their academic and professional growth.
- Support of Student Organizations: As a faculty advisor for the Mines chapter of the American Association of Petroleum Geologists (AAPG) in the early 2000s, Anderson played a role in organizing workshops and leading field trips.
- Workshops for Women in Geoscience: Anderson has been an advocate for advancing opportunities for women in the field. In March 2018, she organized a career workshop that brought together students, alumni, and professionals from the Front Range geoscience community. The event aimed to help women in the discipline and strengthen their professional networks.
- Educational Contribution: Even though this is not considered an formal award, she has co-ownership of Golden Rocks: The Geology and Mining History of Golden, Colorado and her public outreach achievements have been acknowledged as a large portion of her contributions to geoscience education and community involvement.
