= KTAP =

- Santa Maria, California; United States
- Broadcast area: Santa Maria—Lompoc, California
- Frequency: 1600 kHz
- Branding: Radio Ranchito

Programming
- Format: Regional Mexican

Ownership
- Owner: Emerald Wave Media
- Sister stations: KIDI-FM, KRTO

History
- First air date: June 10, 1962
- Former call signs: KWHL (1962); KHER (1962–1967); KZON (1967–1986)

Technical information
- Licensing authority: FCC
- Facility ID: 6142
- Class: D
- Power: 470 watts (day); 26 watts (night)
- Transmitter coordinates: 34°58′48″N 120°27′12″W
- Translator: 92.9 K225CG (Santa Maria)

Links
- Public license information: Public file; LMS

KTAP (1600 AM, "Radio Ranchito") is a commercial radio station licensed to Santa Maria, California, United States, and serves the Santa Maria—Lompoc area. The station is owned by Emerald Wave Media and broadcasts a regional Mexican format. KTAP is rebroadcast on FM translator K225CG at 92.9 FM in Santa Maria.

== History ==
The station originally was assigned the call sign KWHL by the Federal Communications Commission, but it first signed on June 10, 1962 as KHER. The station adopted the KZON call letters in 1967.

In August 1986, KZON changed its call letters to KTAP.

In May 1989, Leo Kesselman sold KTAP to Buenos Diaz Broadcasting Inc., owned by Eduardo Diaz, for $425,000. However, the station would return to Kesselman's possession only two years later.

In March 1996, Kesselman's Boardwalk Broadcasting Company announced a sale of KTAP and sister station KIDI-FM to Hispanic Radio Partners L.P. for $550,000; however, just eight months later in November, Boardwalk sold the combo to Emerald Wave Media for $475,000. In February 2002, Emerald Wave president George Ruiz bought out his partner's shares, taking sole ownership of the station pair for $260,000. KIDI-FM aired a regional Mexican format at the time.

In April 2016, Emerald Wave Media purchased an FM translator in Visalia, California from Living Proof, Inc. for $28,000. The translator was relocated to Santa Maria and began rebroadcasting KTAP as K225CG at 92.9 FM.

On January 18, 2010, high winds in the Point Sal area caused a power outage that knocked 11 of 14 local radio stations (including KTAP) off the air. Using generators, KTAP quickly resumed broadcasting.
