= Ubaldi =

Ubaldi is a surname. Notable people with the name include:

- Benedetto Ubaldi (1588–1644), Italian Roman Catholic cardinal
- Giacomo "Jack" Ubaldi (1910–2001), Italian-American butcher and chef
- Martín Félix Ubaldi (born 1969), Argentine former football striker
- Marzia Ubaldi (1938–2023), Italian actress and voice actress
- Pietro Ubaldi (1886–1972), Italian author, teacher and philosopher

== See also ==
- Baldo degli Ubaldi, is a station on Line A of the Rome Metro
- Baldus de Ubaldis (1327–1400), Italian jurist
