= Trevor Hutton (American football) =

American football player (born 1980)

No. 61
- Position: Offensive guard

Personal information
- Born: February 28, 1980 (age 46); Hilo, Hawaii, U.S.
- Listed height: 6 ft 2 in (1.88 m)
- Listed weight: 308 lb (140 kg)

Career information
- High school: Righetti (Santa Maria, California)
- College: Allan Hancock; Utah State
- NFL draft: 2004: undrafted

Career history
- Indianapolis Colts (2004–2005); Amsterdam Admirals (2005); Los Angeles Avengers (2006); Atlanta Falcons (2006)*; Indianapolis Colts (2006)*
- * Offseason or practice squad member only

Awards and highlights
- Second-team All-Sun Belt (2003)

Career NFL statistics
- Games played: 4
- Stats at Pro Football Reference

Trevor Hutton (born February 28, 1980) is an American former professional football player who was an offensive guard for the Indianapolis Colts of the National football League (NFL) in 2004. He also played with the Amsterdam Admirals and Los Angeles Avengers. He played college football for the Utah State Aggies.

== Early life ==
Hutton graduated from Righetti High School in Santa Maria, California.

== College career ==
Hutton began his collegiate career playing at Allan Hancock College, and was picked to All-Western State Conference First Team lists in 1999 and 2001 (after redshirting in 2000). As a sophomore, he earned two-year All-America Second Team selection. While a Bulldog, Hutton was ranked as the 32nd-best junior college recruit nationally by JC Football, including a ranking of fifth among offensive linemen.

He signed a National Letter of Intent to play at Utah State University. With the Aggies, Hutton was selected to the All-Sun Belt Conference Team in 2003.

== Professional football ==
Hutton played in four regular-season games in 2004 as the Colts advanced to the NFL postseason. He later played with the Amsterdam Admirals in 2005 and the Los Angeles Avengers in 2006.
