= United States Coast Guard Beach Patrol =

WWII-era U.S. Coast Guard ground unit

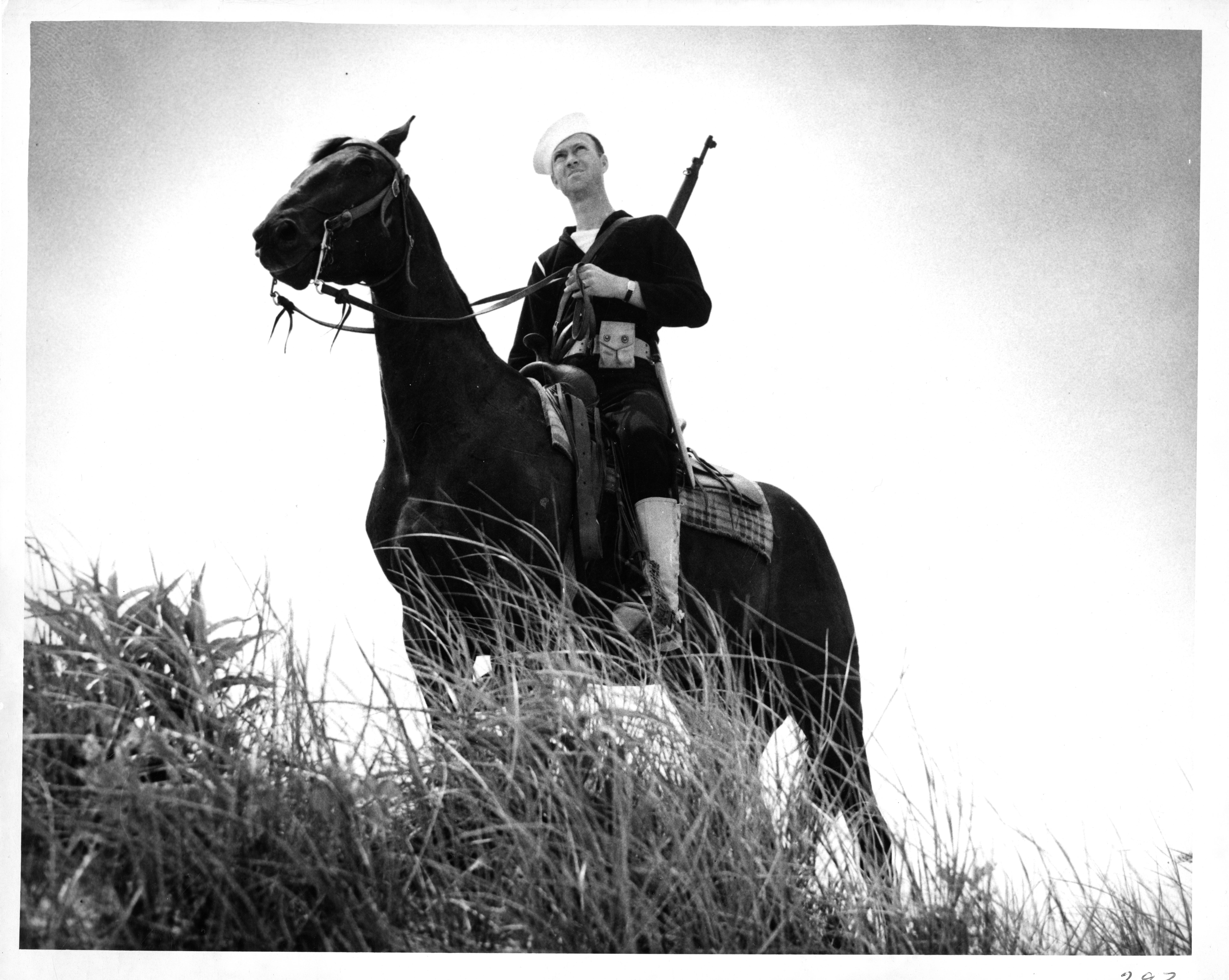
Beach Patrol Coast Guardsman on horseback, 1943

The United States Coast Guard Beach Patrol, nicknamed the "Sand Pounders", was a unit that served within the United States Coast Guard (USCG) during World War II. The group was tasked with patrolling the beaches of the coastline of the United States. Structured patrols officially began 25 July 1942 and were conducted until the end of the war.

== Formation ==
The Attack on Pearl Harbor, along with the threat of potential assaults on the coastline of the United States from the Axis powers, led to the USCG organizing a patrol unit that would help protect the nation. Seaboard locations were developed into strategic defensive positions, referred to as Sea Frontiers, on 3 February 1941. These commands were where the Beach Patrol was to operate. The USGC, subject to the Department of the Navy as of the November 1941 Executive Order 8929 (vice the peacetime control of the USCG by the Department of the Treasury), was tasked with monitoring the coastline in order to keep the nation protected from enemy threats and attacks.

=== Districts ===
In order to simplify command, coastal locations were divided into districts, with each district hosting numerous stations. They were referred to as Naval Districts yet were mainly overseen by the USGC. The districts that operated were:

- First Naval District
  - Headquartered in Boston, Massachusetts. Patrol area ranged from the northern Canadian border to Narragansett Bay, Rhode Island.
  - The district was separated into six varying divisions. The sections were the Boston Section, the Chatham Section (also known as Cape Cod), the Gloucester Section, the Newport Section, the Portland Section, and the Rockland Section.
- Third Naval District
  - Headquartered in New York City, New York. Patrol area included the Port of New York and some of the beach in Long Island and New Jersey.
  - The district was separated into three divisions. The sections were the Connecticut Section, the Long Island Section, and the New Jersey Section.
    - The Long Island Section was further divided into seven groups. The groups were the Amagansett Group, the Bellport Group, the Eaton's Neck Group, the Fire Island Group, the Jones Beach Group, the Rockaway Group, and the Shinnecock Group.
- Fourth Naval District
  - Headquartered in Philadelphia, Pennsylvania. Patrol area included the Delaware coast, the southern New Jersey coast, and the Port of Philadelphia.
  - The district was separated into two divisions. The sections were the Atlantic City Section and the Lewes Section. In order to smoothen operations, these sections were further broken up into groups of stations.
- Fifth Naval District
  - Headquartered in Norfolk, Virginia. Patrol area ranged from Fenwick Island, Delaware, to New River Inlet, North Carolina.
  - While the district was divided into sections, the main way of classifying these areas was the north division and the south division. These in turn were separated into command stations, in which there were ten.
- Sixth Naval District
  - Headquartered in Charleston, South Carolina. Patrol area ranged from New Topsail Inlet, North Carolina, to Ponte Verde, Florida.
  - The district was separated into eight divisions.
- Seventh Naval District
  - Headquartered in Miami, Florida. Patrol area included the coastline of Florida.
  - The district was divided into fourteen divisions.
- Eighth Naval District
  - Headquartered in New Orleans, Louisiana. Patrol area ranged from Apalachicola River and extended west.
  - The district was divided into eight divisions. The sections were the Brownville Section, the Corpus Christi Section, the Galveston Section, the Mobile Section, the New Orleans Section, the Panama City Section, the Pascagoula Section, and the Port Arthur Section.
- Eleventh Naval District
  - Headquartered in Long Beach, California. Patrol area included the southern coastline of California.
  - The district was divided into two divisions. The sections were the North Section and the South Section.
- Twelfth Naval District
  - Headquartered in San Francisco, California. Patrol area ranged from the California-Oregon border to Point Sal, California.
  - The district was divided into eleven divisions, also known as station areas.
- Thirteenth Naval District
  - Headquartered in Seattle, Washington. Patrol area included the northern Pacific coast.
  - The district was divided into three divisions. Two of the sections were the Astoria Section and the Coos Bay Section.

There were an estimated 24,000 personnel who served in ten different districts among coastal states, covering an area of 3,700 miles.

== Operations ==
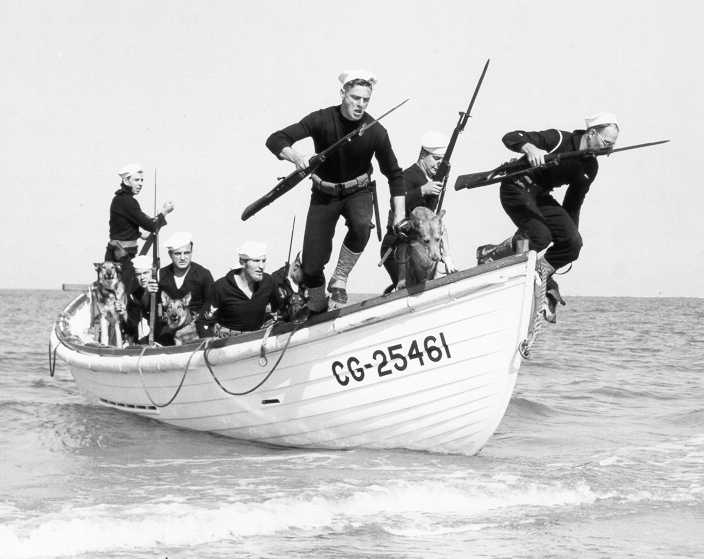
Beach Patrol Coast Guardsmen in South Carolina training in disembarking alongside their working dogs

The function of the Beach Patrol was divided into three parts: report any enemy ships that were spotted; prevent any enemy landing that were to take place; and to shut down any communication between enemies on the coast and enemies on ocean vessels.

Additional duties included acting as a police force along private shoreline locations, serving as a rescue force for those in danger on the beach, and issuing identification cards to sailors who were citizens of the United States for ease of possible investigation.

The Beach Patrol, serving within the USCG, worked alongside the United States Army, the Federal Bureau of Investigation, and the United States Navy. Certain Districts also worked alongside local and state police forces. The Beach Patrol would operate as a scouting and information group, alerting the other branches and agencies of potential enemies. The Army and the Navy would serve the role of coastal defender for the United States.

While initially patrolling the coastline on foot, the USGC switched early on to horseback patrols. The horses and their gear used by the Beach Patrol were provided by the United States Army Remount Service. Utilizing the Dogs For Defense program, their patrols were soon accompanied by trained canines. Other modes of transportation were used as well by the Guardsmen, such as boats and motor vehicles.

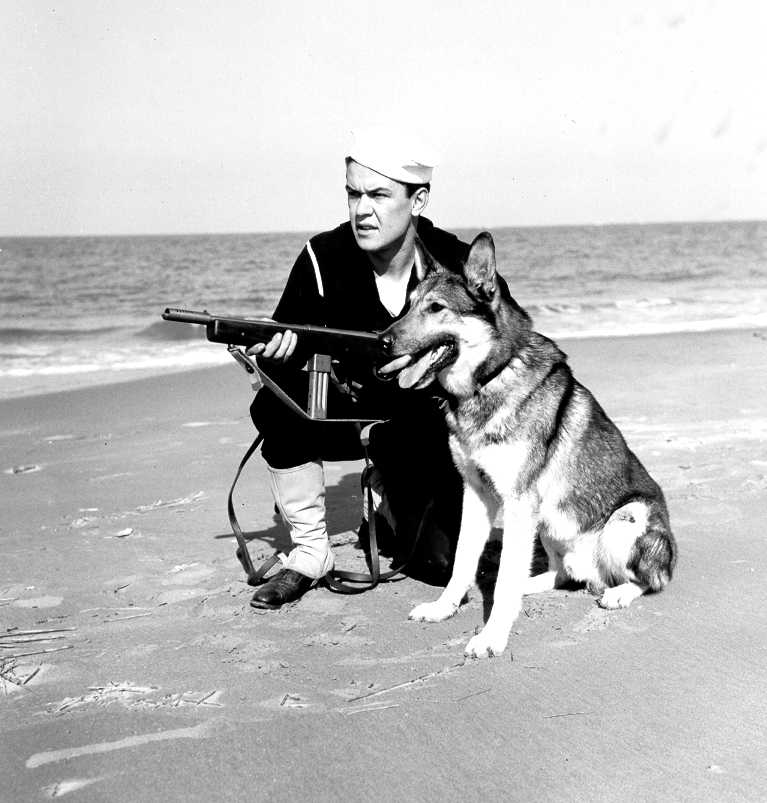
Beach Patrol Coast Guardsman with military working dog and armed with the M50 Reising

== History ==
=== Early operations ===
On 3 February 1941, the sections of the United States coastline were organized into Sea Frontiers, also known as Naval Coastal Frontiers, or Naval Districts. Patrols began soon after.

In order to ensure secure communication within the Beach Patrol, thousands of miles of telephone circuits and lines were installed along the coastline.

=== Long Island, NY landing ===
On 12/13 June 1942, German submarine U-202 emerged off of the coast of Long Island, New York, near Amagansett. Multiple sailors paddled a small boat to the shore, carrying four Nazi agents. These agents were executing Operation Pastorius, a plot to sabotage various locations within the United States.

When the agents made it to land, they were spotted, stopped, and questioned by Seaman 2nd Class John Cullen. In order to evade detainment, the commander of the German group George Dasch, using the alias George Davis, offered a bribe of $300 to Cullen. The Seaman pretended to accept the bribe and let the group go.

Once out of sight, Cullen made his way back to Amagansett Station to report the incident. Gathering other coast guardsmen who were at the station, Cullen and the group made their way back to the shoreline, where they spotted U-202. Searching the area the next morning, the Beach Patrol discovered various explosive devices. The USCG alerted the Federal Bureau of Investigation, and a manhunt soon took place. Eventually the German group was tracked down and brought into custody.

Cullen would later be promoted to Petty Officer 2nd Class and receive the Legion of Merit medal.

On 17 June 1942, a second vessel, German submarine U-584, was sent to Ponte Vedra, Florida, where sabotage operations were to be carried out as well. The arrest of the group in New York led to the Florida plans being discovered before any damage could have taken place.

=== F.W. Abrams rescue ===
On 11 June 1942, the American ship F. W. Abrams travelled through an underwater minefield off the coast of Ocracoke, North Carolina. The vessel struck a mine and suffered from extensive damage. The entire crew of 36 boarded lifeboats and made their way to shore. The Beach Patrol spotted the lifeboats and helped lead them to a safe landing zone. Once the crew made contact with the patrol, they were then assisted and taken to the Coast Guard Station Ocracoke.

=== Patrols formally organized ===
On 25 July 1942, the USCG began to better equip the Beach Patrols with weapons and improved communication devices. The landings in New York and Florida proved to the branch that the security of the coastlines needed to be refined. Working alongside the United States Army, the FBI, and the United States Navy, the basic structure of the Beach Patrol was formed. The group was not to serve as a defense against military attack but instead serve as reporters stationed at outposts.

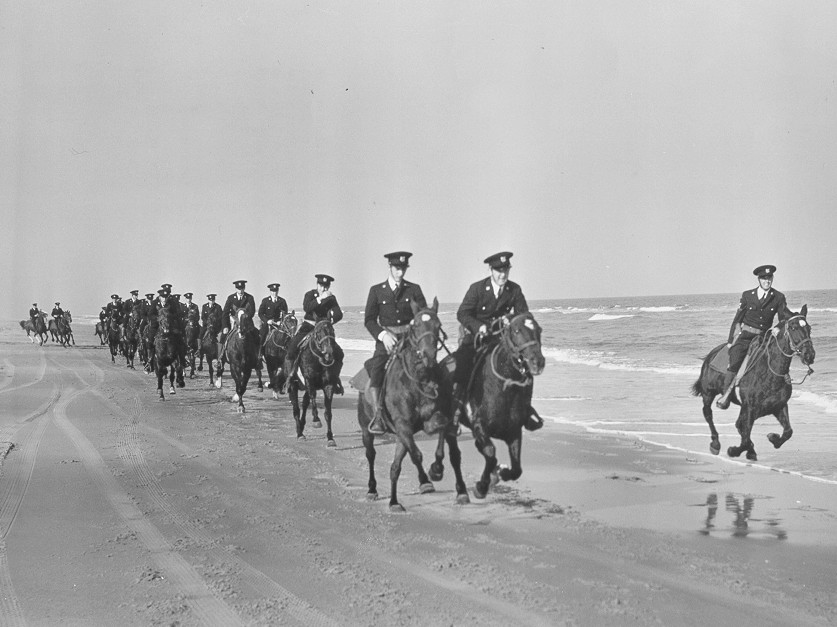
United States Coast Guard Beach Patrol riding along the coast

Personnel would typically patrol the beaches on horseback, but patrols on foot would take place as well. They were commonly accompanied by trained dogs. The patrols with dogs began in August 1942 in Brigantine Park, New Jersey. In states that had shores that were difficult to traverse, there was other modes of transportation that were issued, such as boats and motor vehicles.

The USCG stated that all of the United States' coastlines were secured and under full surveillance by the end of 1943.

=== Lamut rescue ===
On 31 March 1943, the Russian ship Lamut ran aground near Teahwhit Head, Washington. The vessel rested on its side after colliding with a rock formation. A morning Beach Patrol from Coast Guard Station Quillayute River spotted the ship in peril and quickly acted to try and save the crew. Two groups approached: one that travelled through the water, and one that came from the top of the cliff that the Lamut leaned against. The cliff group only had a small supply of rope that was unable to reach the trapped crew. Using their shoelaces and bandages from a first aid kit, the group was able to extend their rope and reach the ship. Nearly all of the 53-person crew was able to be rescued, but one individual passed away before the Beach Patrol had arrived.

=== Abolition ===
With World War II slowly coming to an end, the need for a well-maintained Beach Patrol was no longer needed. Beginning 18 February 1944, the number of personnel serving on the West Coast was reduced to only 50% of its original size. The East Coast and South Coast reached a similar fate starting 1 April 1944. Security of the United States' coastline would be transferred over to the United States Army for the remainder of the war, with the USGC still serving in a limited capacity. The Beach Patrol was officially put out of service on 15 October 1944.
