= Kenny Heitz =

American basketball player

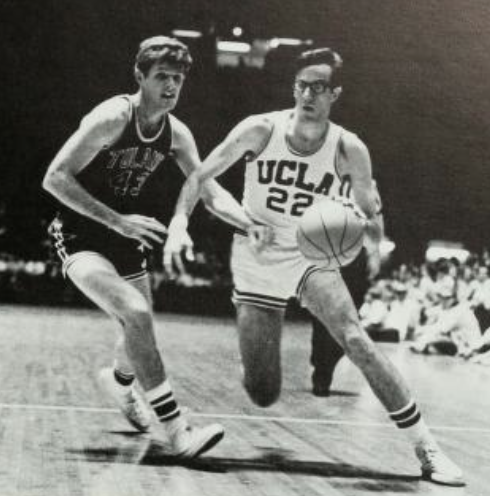
- Heitz with UCLA during 1969–70 season

Personal information
- Born: June 25, 1947 Santa Barbara County, California
- Died: July 9, 2012 (aged 65) Los Angeles, California

Career information
- High school: Ernest Righetti (Santa Maria, California)
- College: UCLA (1966–1969)
- NBA draft: 1969: 5th round, 59th overall pick
- Drafted by: Milwaukee Bucks
- Position: Guard

Career highlights
- 3× NCAA champion (1967–1969)
- Stats at Basketball Reference

Kenneth Robert Heitz (June 25, 1947 – July 9, 2012) was an American basketball player and attorney. He won three collegiate national championships with the UCLA Bruins from 1967 to 1969, one of the first players in National Collegiate Athletic Association (NCAA) history to do so.

Heitz was a 6'3" guard/forward who played at Ernest Righetti High School in Santa Maria, California. At Righetti, Heitz earned honors as a high school All-American and was California Interscholastic Federation Player of the Year in his senior season. He graduated with honors in May 1965.

He went to UCLA in 1965 as a part of a legendary recruiting class of head coach John Wooden. Along with classmates Lew Alcindor (later Kareem Abdul-Jabbar), Lynn Shackelford and Lucius Allen, Heitz played on UCLA teams that went 88–2 over three years and was the first school to capture three consecutive national championships. Heitz was known for his tenacious defense.

As a senior in 1968–69, Heitz started for the Bruins. He averaged 6.5 points per game and was named an Academic All-American. In the national championship game, Heitz did not score, but he received consideration as the contest's most valuable player for his defense against Purdue's high-scoring Rick Mount, who shot just 12-for-36, including 14 straight misses, while scoring 28 points. For his college career, Heitz averaged 6.0 points and 2.3 rebounds per game.

Following graduation, Heitz was drafted by the Milwaukee Bucks in the fifth round (59th pick overall) of the 1969 NBA draft. He participated in the Bucks' summer training camp, but he never played professional basketball. He instead went to Harvard Law School and graduated in 1972.

He joined the law firm Irell & Manella in Los Angeles and became a senior partner specializing in commercial litigation and corporate law. He was also executive vice president and general counsel of Columbia Savings and Loan from 1988 to 1991 and was briefly its CEO. He served on the board of directors of the El Paso Electric since 1996 and as chairman of the board since 2008, and on the board of directors of Ares Capital Corporation since 2011.

Heitz was inducted into the Northern Santa Barbara County Athletic Roundtable Hall of Fame in 2001. In 2003, he was inducted into the first class of the Righetti Athletic Hall of Fame.

Heitz died of cancer at age 65 on July 9, 2012. He was survived by his wife Linda (1947–2016), daughters Jennifer, Joanna and Alexis, and two grandchildren.
