= Santa Maria Joint Union High School District =

School district in California, United States

Address
- 2560 Skyway Drive Santa Maria, California, 93455; United States

District information
- Type: Public
- Grades: 9–12
- NCES District ID: 0635670

Students and staff
- Students: 8,953 (2020–2021)
- Teachers: 390.63 (FTE)
- Staff: 414.24 (FTE)
- Student–teacher ratio: 22.92:1

Other information
- Website: www.smjuhsd.k12.ca.us

Santa Maria Joint Union High School District (SMJUHSD) operates four high schools (Delta, Ernest Righetti, Santa Maria, and Pioneer Valley) located in Santa Maria, California. Currently, 7,800 students are enrolled in this district.

== History ==
Previously the logo had a ship in honor of Christopher Columbus, but in 2021 the district decided to remove the ship.

== High schools ==
- Santa Maria High School
- Pioneer Valley High School
- Ernest Righetti High School

== Secondary school ==
- Delta Continuation High School

== Related school districts ==
- Santa Maria-Bonita School District
- Orcutt Union School District
