= Ernest Righetti High School =

Location
- 941 E. Foster Rd. Santa Maria, California 93455; United States; 34.88366°N 120.42127°W

Information
- School type: Public high school
- Motto: Greatness Starts Here
- Established: 1963
- School district: Santa Maria Joint Union High School District
- Principal: Ted Lyon
- Teaching staff: 120.41 (FTE)
- Grades: 9-12
- Enrollment: 2,424 (2023-2024)
- Student to teacher ratio: 20.13
- Campus size: 36 acres (15 ha)
- Campus type: Suburban
- Colors: Purple and Gold
- Nickname: Warrior
- Newspaper: The Legend
- Website: Righetti High School

Ernest Righetti High School (commonly Righetti, or RHS) is a public comprehensive secondary school in Santa Maria, California, United States, serving students in grades 9-12. The school is part of the Santa Maria Joint Union High School District. Righetti is a fully accredited, two-time California Distinguished School, awarded in 2002 and 2009. Righetti High School was built in the suburban community of Orcutt, California in 1963 to relieve overcrowding at Santa Maria High School, opening in January 1963 and graduating its first class in June 1964. The school was named for a local civic leader whose family has engaged in cattle ranching in the Santa Maria area for several generations. The school's boundaries encompass several elementary school districts that serve the communities of Orcutt, Guadalupe, Los Alamos, Sisquoc, Garey, and Casmalia, as well portions of the city of Santa Maria and rural northern Santa Barbara County.

Righetti High School maintains a large comprehensive array of academic and athletic programs as well as several electives and vocational programs, and a renowned agricultural studies program. Academic performance standards have risen steadily since the early 2000s. As of the 2018-2019 school year, the school had an approximate enrollment of 2,301 students and 93 classroom teachers. The principal of Righetti High School is Mr. Ted Lyon.

== Campus ==
Righetti High School is located on a 37 acres (15 ha) campus on a north-facing slope overlooking the Santa Maria Valley in the Los Padres foothills. Most of the permanent classrooms, laboratories, and shops are situated in four single story classroom 'blocks' with approximately 65 classrooms. Through the south-central side of the campus, the three classroom blocks are arranged in a line from west to east and consist of rooms that surround grassy courtyards. The Warrior Gym, the amphitheater-style Greek Theater, the quad, the career center, and the cafeteria all lie in a north–south arrangement roughly perpendicular to the three main classroom blocks. Staff and student parking surround the west and south sides of the campus. The Industrial Arts Building (The 400 Block), the Agricultural Unit, Warrior Gym, Rob Knight Pool, Warrior Stadium, and all athletic fields are situated down hill on the north end of campus. The school is known for having a Colorblind Club on campus. This club's inaugural year was 2017, and it has since been the most well known club on campus. The increase of student enrollment over the past 25 years has necessitated the placement of 35 portable structures that are now mostly situated in the eastern parking lot.

Since 1998, through state and local bond funding, Righetti has undergone extensive renovations and additions. Every permanent classroom on campus has been remodeled with new heat/circulation, flooring, ceilings, roofing, asbestos abatement, upgraded data ports, and ‘teaching walls’. With the approval of local voters, bond C2004 has provided RHS with realigned parking lots and electrical upgrades, a new synthetic track and turf field in Warrior Stadium, renovation of the Industrial Arts Building, two new classrooms, one of which is the wrestling room. After many years of successful water polo and swimming programs, Righetti High School opened its first on-campus swimming pool, Rob Knight Pool, in September 2009. The last phases of new construction will include a new three-story building that contains the math and English departments.

== Academics ==
Righetti offers a number of elective courses including Art, Concert, Jazz and Marching Bands, Choir, Madrigals, Ballet Folklórico, Marimba Band, Guitar, Photography, Video Production, Home Economics, Sewing, Marriage and Family, Cooking, Wood Shop, Welding, and Furniture Construction. There are also a large number of academic electives, including Marine Science, Physiology and Anatomy, Advanced Geology, and Psychology.

Regional Occupational (ROP) Courses

- Accounting and Finance II
- Advanced Video Productions/Filmmaking
- CAD Manufacturing I
- CAD Manufacturing II
- Communication Technology
- Economics and Finance
- Introduction to Education
- Medical Science/Health Careers (available at Santa Maria High School)
- Multimedia Occupations
- Ornamental Horticulture
- Advanced Ornamental Horticulture
- Retail Merchandising
- Viticulture Occupations

== Athletics ==
Ernest Righetti High School sports teams are nicknamed the Warriors, and its mascot is Willie the Warrior. Since 2018, the school has competed in the Central Coast Athletic Association, which is affiliated with the CIF Central Section. Previously, RHS was a long-time member of the CIF Southern Section (CIF-SS) and competed in the Pac-8 League. The school is situated across the street from one of its biggest rivals, St. Joseph High School.

== Notable alumni ==
- Mike Bishop, former MLB player
- Jonathan Dally, pro football quarterback
- Kenny Heitz, former UCLA basketball player
- Trevor Hutton, pro football offensive lineman
- Chris Lambert, musician and podcaster
- Ron McLean, NFL defensive lineman
- Matt Sauer, Major League Baseball draftee
- Robin Ventura, former MLB player and manager
