= KRTO =

- Guadalupe, California; United States
- Broadcast area: Santa Maria—Lompoc, California
- Frequency: 97.1 MHz
- Branding: Fuego 97.1

Programming
- Languages: Spanish, English
- Format: Rhythmic contemporary

Ownership
- Owner: Emerald Wave Media
- Sister stations: KIDI-FM, KTAP

History
- First air date: 1992
- Former call signs: KOHD (1990–1992, CP); KIDI-FM (1992–2007)
- Former frequencies: 105.5 MHz (1992–2007)
- Call sign meaning: Concierto

Technical information
- Licensing authority: FCC
- Facility ID: 7101
- Class: A
- ERP: 360 watts
- HAAT: 404 meters (1,325 ft)
- Transmitter coordinates: 34°53′52″N 120°35′23″W

Links
- Public license information: Public file; LMS
- Website: fuego971.com

KRTO (97.1 FM) is a commercial radio station licensed to Santa Maria, California, United States, and serves the Central Coast from Paso Robles to the Santa Ynez Valley. KRTO's studios are located in Santa Maria and its transmitter is near Point Sal just outside of Guadalupe. The station is owned by Emerald Wave Media and airs a bilingual English—Spanish rhythmic contemporary format.

== History ==
The station originated in a Federal Communications Commission (FCC) construction permit issued in 1988 to Armando Garcia for a new station in Guadalupe, California. Originally holding the call letters KOHD, it signed on in 1992 as KIDI-FM at the 105.5 MHz frequency with new owner Spanish TV 59. The following year, Spanish TV 59 principal Leo Kesselman merged KIDI-FM with KTAP of Santa Maria into a new entity, Boardwalk Broadcasting Company.

In March 1996, Boardwalk Broadcasting announced a sale of KIDI-FM and KTAP to Hispanic Radio Partners L.P. for $550,000; however, just eight months later in November, Boardwalk sold the combo to Emerald Wave Media for $475,000. KIDI-FM aired a regional Mexican format at the time.

In 2006, the station aired a Spanish top 40 format known as "Concierto" (Spanish for "concert"); the call letters were changed to KRTO to reflect this branding.

In 2007, Emerald Wave Media relocated La Buena from the 105.5 FM frequency to 105.1 FM. This was done to send a cleaner signal towards the Santa Ynez Valley, avoiding interference with Ventura-based KFYV (also at 105.5 FM). However, the KRTO calls were moved to 97.1 FM.

Logo for KRTO as "Mega 97.1".

In mid-2008, Emerald Wave Media flipped the format of 97.1 FM from country music as "Colt 97.1" to rhythmic oldies as "Mega 97.1". Mega is a continuation of the format that aired on KPAT from 1999 to 2004, when it was known as "Mega 95.7" under the ownership of American General Media.

On January 18, 2010, high winds in the Point Sal area caused a power outage that knocked the transmitter for KRTO, KIDI-FM (105.1 FM), and KTAP (1600 AM) off the air. Power to the transmitter and the signals of the sister stations were restored the same day; however, KRTO remained silent for several days following the outage.

In July 2019, KRTO changed their format from rhythmic oldies to rhythmic contemporary, branded as "Mega Hits 97.1". On January 4, 2021, KRTO changed their format from rhythmic contemporary to bilingual rhythmic, branded as "Fuego 97.1".
