= FFA =

FFA or ffa may refer to:

== Aviation and military ==
- First Flight Airport, near Kitty Hawk, North Carolina, United States
- Free-fire area, in U.S. military parlance
- Flug- und Fahrzeugwerke Altenrhein, a Swiss aircraft and railway vehicle manufacturer
- Feldflieger Abteilung, of the German army's air service in World War I

== Business and commerce ==
- Ferrara Fire Apparatus, a builder of fire trucks and other emergency vehicles
- Forward freight agreement
- Field force automation
- Furniture, fixtures and equipment (accounting), sometimes "furniture, fixtures and accessories" (FF&A)

== Entertainment ==
- Final Fantasy Adventure, Game Boy game that is actually part of the Mana series
- Final Fantasy Anthology, a computer role-playing game compilation
- Far from Alaska, a Brazilian stoner rock group
- Food for Animals, an American hip-hop group
- Festival du film francophone d'Angoulême, an annual festival in France

== Finance ==
- FFA Private Bank
- Fellow of the Faculty of Actuaries
- Financial Fraud Action UK
- Forward-forward agreement
- Free File Alliance in the United States
- Full fiscal autonomy for Scotland
- Fellow member of the Institute of Financial Accountants

== Sport ==
- Fédération française d'athlétisme, the governing body for the sport of athletics in France
- FFA Centre of Excellence, a defunct Australian football club
- Florida Football Alliance, an amateur American football league
- Football Federation Australia
- Football Federation of Armenia
- First free ascent, in climbing and mountaineering

== Science and computing ==
- Fast folding algorithm
- Finite field arithmetic
- Fixed-Field alternating gradient Accelerator
- Flash flood watch, issued by the United States National Weather Service
- Ford–Fulkerson algorithm
- Free fatty acid
- Fusiform face area
- Fundus fluorescein angiography; see fluorescein angiography

== Other uses ==
- Federal Firearms Act
- Fugitive Felon Act
- National FFA Organization (Future Farmers of America), an American student organization
- Pacific Islands Forum Fisheries Agency
- Fatima Family Apostolate, a U.S.-based Roman Catholic organization
