= Santa Maria–style barbecue =

California Central Coast culinary style

Tri-tip on the grill, with a saucepan of beans and loaves of bread

Santa Maria–style barbecue is a regional culinary tradition rooted in the Santa Maria Valley in Santa Barbara County on the Central Coast of California. This method of barbecuing dates back to the mid-19th century and is today regarded as a "mainstay of California's culinary heritage".

The original Santa Maria-style barbecue consisted of large chunks of top sirloin seasoned with garlic, salt and pepper, then slow-cooked over red oak coals. When tri-tip was introduced in the 1950s, it became the meat of choice. It centers on beef tri-tip, seasoned with black pepper, salt, and garlic before grilling slowly over coals of native coast live oak, often referred to as "red oak" wood. The grill is made of iron and usually has a hand crank to adjust the height of the grill over the coals.

The traditional accompaniments are pinquito beans, fresh salsa, tossed green salad, and grilled French bread dipped in sweet melted butter. Many locals and well-known establishments also include Portuguese linguiça, a kind of spicy sausage, in the lineup of traditional Santa Maria-style barbecue meats.

Some regional variations within the Central Coast include sausage (such as linguiça or chorizo) or venison, grilled alongside the tri-tip or in the beans, and fresh strawberries.

== History ==
Santa Maria–style barbecue originated in the mid-19th century when local Californio ranchers hosted Spanish-style feasts each spring for their vaqueros. They barbecued meat over earthen pits filled with hot coals of local coast live oak. The meal was served with pinquitos, small pink beans that are considered indigenous to the Santa Maria Valley.

According to local barbecue historian R. H. Tesene, "The Santa Maria Barbecue grew out of this tradition and achieved its 'style' when local residents began to string cuts of beef on skewers or rods and cook the meat over the hot coals of a red oak fire."

In 1931, the Santa Maria Club started a "Stag Barbecue", which was held on the second Wednesday of every month, with up to 700 patrons attending each event.

By the late 1950s, four local restaurants—The Far Western Tavern, The Valley Steakhouse, Hitching Post, and Jocko's—were on their way to becoming landmarks of this style of barbecue.

The original cut was top sirloin. Then, as today, the meat was rolled in a mixture of salt, pepper, and garlic salt before being barbecued over the red oak coals, which contributes a smoky, hearty flavor.

In the 1950s, local butcher Bob Schutz (Santa Maria Market) perfected the tri-tip, a triangular bottom sirloin cut that quickly joined top sirloin as a staple of Santa Maria–style barbecue.

President Ronald Reagan was a fan of Santa Maria–style barbecue. Local barbecue chef Bob Herdman and his Los Compadres Barbecue Crew staged several barbecues for President Reagan, including five feasts on the South Lawn of the White House.

It is mentioned in the Madden movie

== Beans ==
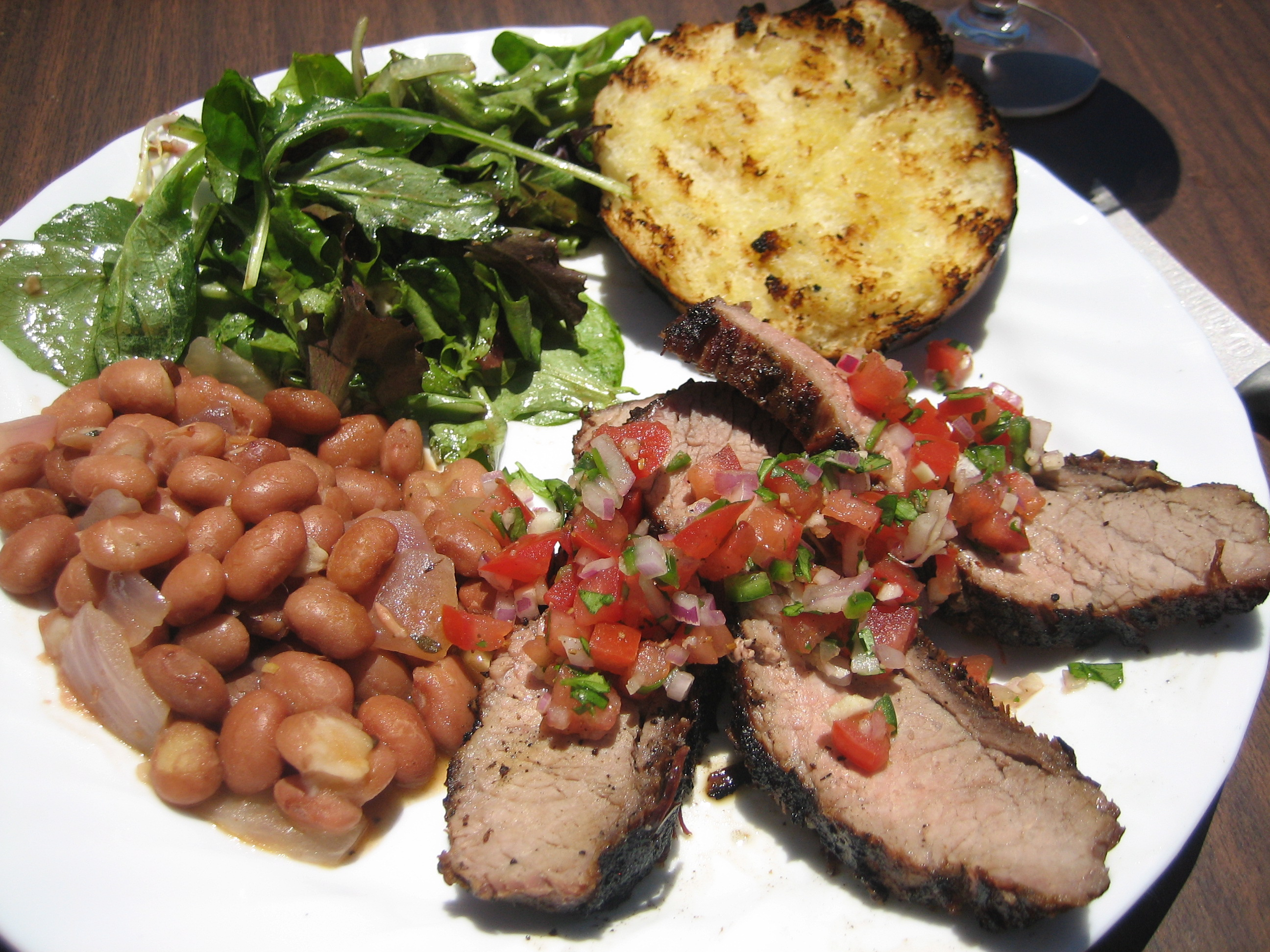
Santa Maria–style barbecue made with pink beans, due to unavailability of pinquito beans

Pinquito beans are an essential component of the traditional Santa Maria–style barbecue menu. They are a cross between a pink bean and a small white bean, and grow well in the fertile soil and mild climate of the Santa Maria Valley. Betteravia Farms began growing pinquito beans commercially in 1972. Another specialty purveyor of pinquito beans and other Santa Maria–style barbecue foods is Susie Q's Brand.

== See also ==
- Barbecue
- Cuisine of California
- Santa Maria, California
