= KIDI-FM =

- Lompoc, California; United States
- Broadcast area: Santa Maria—Lompoc, California
- Frequency: 105.1 MHz
- Branding: La Buena

Programming
- Format: Regional Mexican

Ownership
- Owner: Emerald Wave Media
- Sister stations: KRTO, KTAP

History
- First air date: 1999

Technical information
- Licensing authority: FCC
- Facility ID: 38306
- Class: B1
- ERP: 3,400 watts
- HAAT: 275 meters (902 ft)
- Transmitter coordinates: 34°44′31″N 120°26′46″W

Links
- Public license information: Public file; LMS
- Webcast: Listen live
- Website: labuena.fm

KIDI-FM (105.1 FM, "La Buena") is a commercial radio station licensed to Lompoc, California, United States, and serves the Santa Maria—Lompoc area. The station is owned by Emerald Wave Media and broadcasts a Spanish contemporary format.

== History ==
The station first signed on in 1999 as KAOH, then changed its call letters to KWSZ the following year. In 2002, Coast West Broadcasting sold the station to New Century AZ LLC for $900,000.

On July 1, 2006, under new ownership by Emerald Wave Media, KWSZ flipped from adult hits to Spanish contemporary with the branding "Concierto 105.1 FM". A matching call sign, KRTO, was assigned by the Federal Communications Commission on July 18.

On September 28, 2007, KWSZ adopted the KIDI-FM call sign, which previously had been used at the 105.5 FM frequency before it was abandoned by Emerald Wave Media.

On January 18, 2010, high winds in the Point Sal area caused a power outage that knocked the KIDI-FM transmitter off the air. Power to the transmitter was restored the same day, allowing KIDI-FM to resume broadcasting.
