= Financial Fraud Action UK =

Organization

- Abbreviation: FFA UK
- Location: London, United Kingdom
- Website: www.financialfraudaction.org.uk

Financial Fraud Action UK (FFA UK) is the name the financial services industry uses to coordinate its fraud prevention activities.

FFA UK is sponsored by the UK Cards Association for its attempts to prevent fraud on credit and debit cards and the Fraud Control Steering Group on non-cards fraud matters. They also work with the Cheque and Credit Clearing Company (C&CCC) to eliminate credit clearing and cheque fraud.

The Fraud Control Steering Group is an unincorporated group of retail banking providers in the UK. In addition to devising and implementing policies, the association ensures a united industry approach to combating payment, cheque and lending fraud.

== Activities ==
Financial Fraud Action UK (FFA UK) spearheads the collective fight against fraud in the UK payments industry. Working in conjunction with industry partners, government and the police, FFA UK aims to help the public and businesses to protect themselves from financial fraud. Activities undertaken by FFA UK include the following:

- Representing a unified voice on behalf of members.
- Sponsoring the Dedicated Cheque & Plastic Crime Unit (DCPCU).
- Scrutinising the Industry Hot Card File which exposes fraudulent card transactions.
- Dealing with media enquiries regarding fraud and financial crime via their press office.
- Engaging with key external stakeholders, such as Government, on behalf of members to tackle fraud.
- Ensuring card companies and banks are flexible and robust in their approach to fraud intelligence sharing.
- Managing an Industry Strategic Threat Management process which provides a current and future observation of fraud and the financial crime landscape. Key fraud threats are identified in this process and assist the industry in creating programmes of cross-industry project activity to attend to these threats.
- Developing industry feedback to new technology and payments system changes that examine fraud considerations.
- Delivering fraud management information on behalf of the industry to decide the complete scale of fraud and emerging trends.
- Promoting public awareness by conducting campaigns aimed at consumers and businesses which stress simple fraud prevention steps that can be taken by individuals.

== DCPCU ==
The Dedicated Cheque and Plastic Crime Unit (DCPCU) is a special police unit encompassing police officers drawn from the City of London and Metropolitan Police forces.

Fully endorsed by the banking industry, the DCPCU is also supported by bank investigators and case support staff who are designated to assist with eradicating organised card and cheque fraud across the UK.

== See also ==
- Prevention of Social Housing Fraud Act 2013
- Specialist, Organised & Economic Crime Command
