= Tri-tip =

Cut of beef

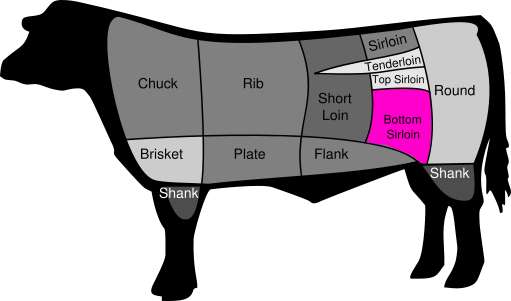
- Bottom sirloin triangular cut (tri-tip)
- Alternative names: Bottom sirloin triangular cut (tri-tip)
- Type: Beef steak

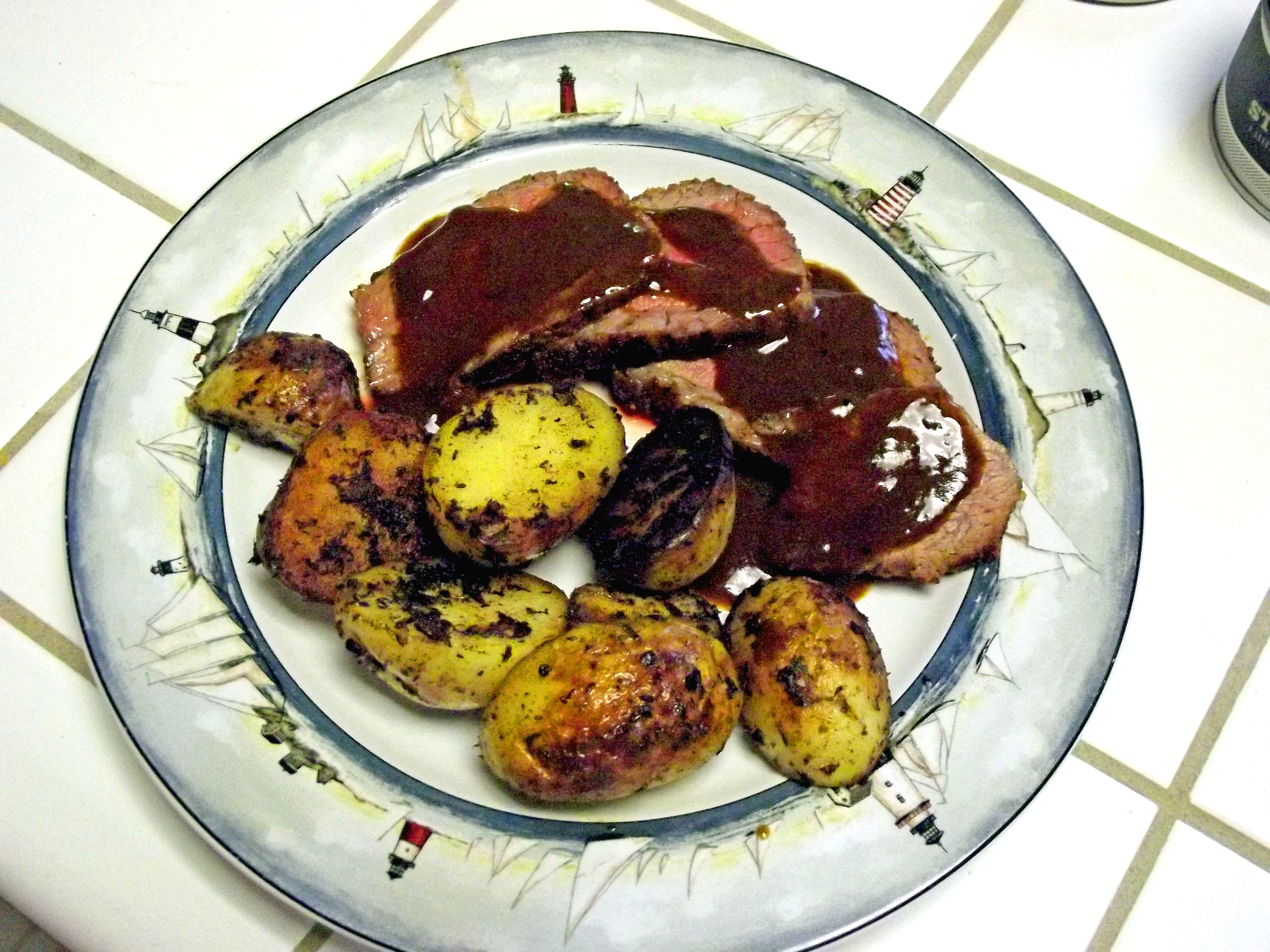
Tri-tip dinner with gravy, served with brown butter, parsley potatoes

The tri-tip is a triangular cut of beef from the bottom sirloin subprimal cut, consisting of the tensor fasciae latae muscle. Untrimmed, the tri-tip weighs around 5 pounds. In the US, the tri-tip is taken from NAMP cut 185C.

== Etymology ==
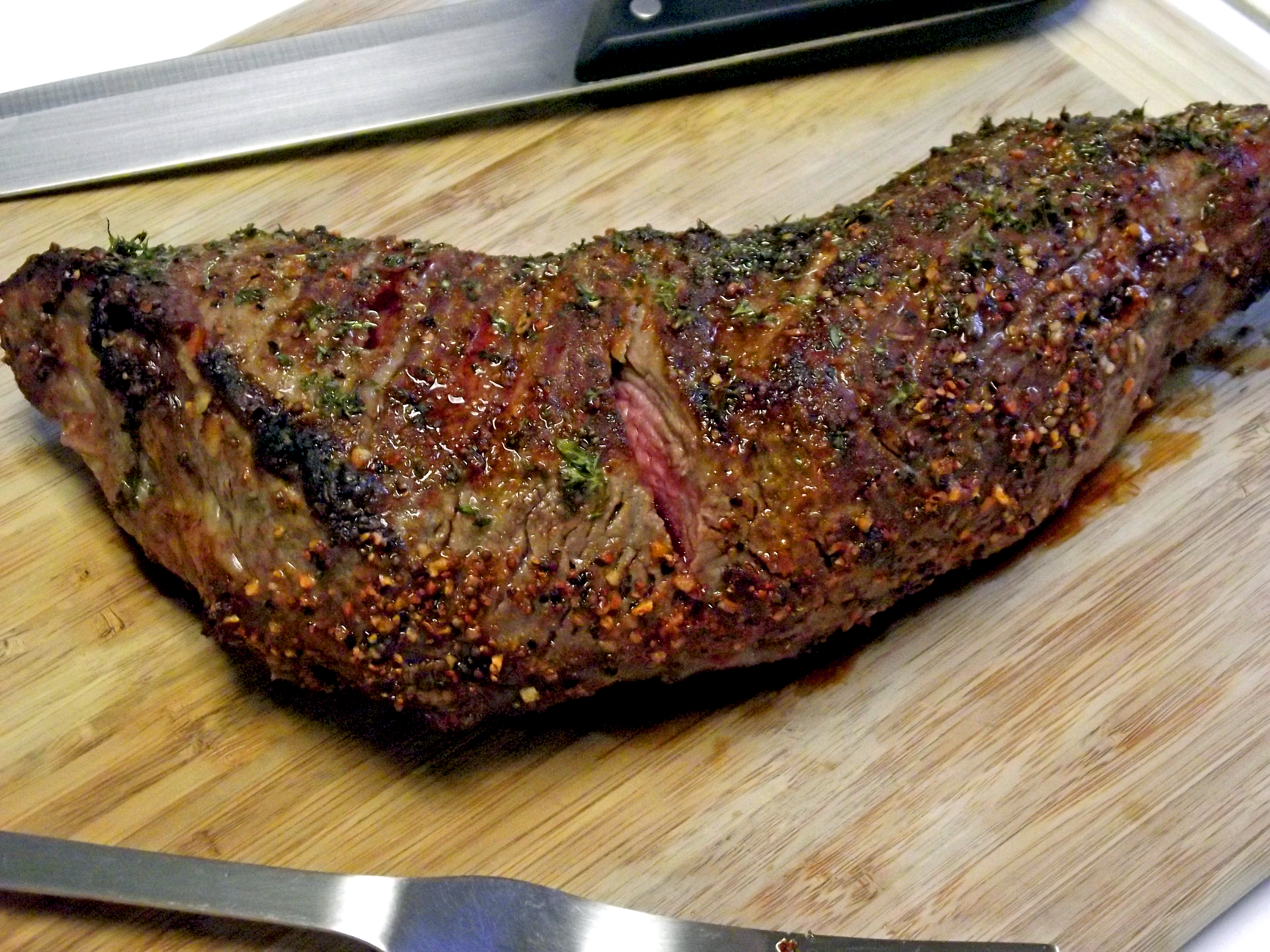
Roasted tri-tip

The term "tri-tip" is used across the US, but is especially popular in California. The precise origin of the name for this cut of beef is unclear, with several sources claiming original usage of the term. It has been referred to by a variety of names including "Newport steak", "Santa Maria steak" (from its use in Santa Maria-style barbecue), "triangle tip", and "triangle steak".

== United States ==
The cut was known in the United States as early as 1915, called "the triangle part" of the loin butt. Rondo (Ron) Brough, a butcher for the US Army during World War II working in Southern California, claimed that he created the "triangle tip" cut as a way to gain an extra portion of meat for the troops by reorienting nearby cuts and eliminating scrap. This practice caught on with Brough's Army colleagues and after the War, they began cutting and serving triangle tip throughout restaurants and butcher shops in California.

Otto Schaefer Sr. originally named and marketed tri-tip in Oakland, California, in the 1950s.

Butcher and restaurateur Jack Ubaldi claimed to have originally named and marketed tri-tip under the name "Newport steak" in the 1950s.

Triangle tip, cooked in wine, was served at Jack's Corsican Room in Long Beach in 1955. The cut was marketed under the name "tri-tip" as early as 1964, at Desert Provisions in Palm Springs.

Larry Viegas, a butcher at a Santa Maria Safeway store in the late 1950s, claimed that the idea to cook this as a distinct cut of beef first occurred to his store manager, Bob Schutz, when an excess of hamburger existed in the store (into which this part of the animal were usually ground). Viegas says that Schultz took a piece of the unwanted meat, seasoned it with salt, pepper, and garlic salt, and placed it on a rotisserie for 45 minutes or an hour; the result was well-received, and Schultz began marketing the cut as "tri-tip".

It became a local specialty in Santa Maria in the late 1950s. Today, it is seasoned with salt, pepper, fresh garlic, and other seasonings, grilled directly over red oak wood to medium-rare doneness. Alternative preparations include roasting whole on a rotisserie, smoking in a pit, roasting in an oven, grilling, or braising in a Dutch oven after searing on a grill. After cooking, the meat is normally sliced across the grain before serving.

Sometimes labeled "Santa Maria steak", the roast is popular in the Central Valley regions and the Central Coast of California. Along with top sirloin, tri-tip is considered central to Santa Maria-style barbecue. In central California, the fat is left on the outside of the cut to enhance flavor when grilling, while butchers elsewhere trim the fat side for aesthetic purposes.

== Europe ==
Tri-tip is called aiguillette baronne in France and is left whole as a roast. In northern Germany, it is called Bürgermeisterstück or Pastorenstück, in Austria Hüferschwanz, and in southern Germany it is called the same name as the traditional and popular Bavarian and Austrian dish Tafelspitz, which serves it boiled with horseradish. In Spain, it is often grilled whole and called the rabillo de cadera.

== South America ==
In Argentine asado, it is known as colita de cuadril. In Brazil, it is known as maminha.

== Cooking ==
This cut of beef can be sliced into steaks, grilled in its entirety, or used in chili con carne. To grill or roast the tri-tip, heat the pan on high until it is very hot. The roast can then be put in the oven and cooked for about 10 minutes per pound until the internal temperature is 130–135 °F (54–57 °C) for medium-rare.

== See also ==
- Cut of beef
- List of steak dishes
