= Santa Maria-Bonita School District =

School district in California

Address
- 708 South Miller Street Santa Maria, California, 93454; United States

District information
- Type: Public
- Grades: K–8
- NCES District ID: 0605580

Students and staff
- Students: 16,665 (2020–2021)
- Teachers: 773.68 (FTE)
- Staff: 738.86 (FTE)
- Student–teacher ratio: 21.54:1

Other information
- Website: www.smbsd.org

The Santa Maria-Bonita School District in Santa Maria, California, has four junior high schools and seventeen elementary schools with approximately about 17,500 students enrolled.

== Elementary schools ==
- Juan Pacifico Ontiveros Elementary School
- Ida Redmond Taylor Elementary School
- Bonita Elementary School
- George Washington Battles Elementary School
- Don Juan Bautista Arellanes Elementary School
- Martin Luther Tunnell Elementary School
- Isaac Miller Elementary School
- Liberty Elementary School
- Robert Bruce Elementary School
- William Hickman Rice Elementary School
- Fairlawn Elementary School
- David Sanchez Sr. Elementary School
- William Laird Adam Elementary School
- Alvin Avenue Elementary School
- Cary Calvin Oakley Elementary School
- Roberto & Dr. Francisco Jimenez Elementary School
- Bill Libbon Elementary School

== Junior high schools ==
- Isaac Fesler Junior High School
- Tommie Kunst Junior High School
- El Camino Junior High School
- Don Juan Bautista Arellanes Junior High School
