= Jack Ubaldi =

Italian-American butcher and chef (1910–2001)

Giacomo "Jack" Ubaldi (September 16, 1910 – July 14, 2001) was an Italian-American butcher and chef. Ubaldi is credited for the selection, marketing and sale of bottom sirloin subprimal cuts in New York City as the "Newport steak."

Ubaldi was born in Perugia, Italy on September 16, 1910. In February 1918, he traveled with family aboard the Dante Alighieri and was processed at Ellis Island, receiving American citizenship in 1932. Ubaldi left formal education after the eighth grade to train as a butcher and chef, working variously for independent and family-owned ventures before opening Greenwich Village butcher shop Florence Prime Meat Market in 1936. He kept the business temporarily closed while serving in the United States Navy from 1943 to 1946, and sold it in 1974. From 1976 to 1995, Ubaldi instructed demonstration courses in selecting, preparing and cutting meat at The New School for Social Research and the Institute of Culinary Education.

Ubaldi described his introduction to and use of the bottom sirloin:

When I was discharged from the United States Navy, and returned to New York to reopen my store, I found that meat wholesalers had switched over to the system of selling beef that now prevails, that of "fabricating" beef, that is, cut-down sections of the meat instead of forequarters and hindquarters. Many of these cuts were new to me. The bottom butt caught my eye and, as the price was reasonable, I bought three pieces, each weighing about 8 to 10 pounds. When I got them back to the store and took them apart, I liked the high quality of the meat and its fat content. I sliced the piece that is shaped like a triangle into little steaks about 1 to 1¼ inches thick.

At that time a lot of my customers were single people or young couples, and they really took to these steaks and their reasonable price, but they wanted to know what to ask for next time they came in. One night [after 1957] I saw an ad for Newport cigarettes on television and was struck by the similarity of the white quarter moon opening the ad to the shape of my little steaks. So we christened them Newport steaks.

Ubaldi was one of several American butchers and chefs in the 1940s and 1950s to have independently utilized the bottom sirloin from fabricated beef. Ubaldi's preparation of the bottom butt involved a unique, undisclosed cut and folding technique, which is reproduced by current ownership of Florence Prime Meat Market in its offering of the Newport steak.
