= Santa Maria High School =

Location
- 901 S. Broadway; Santa Maria, California; Santa Maria, California 93454; United States
- Coordinates: 34°56′21″N 120°26′23″W

Information
- Established: 1891
- School district: Santa Maria Joint Union High School District
- Principal: Steve Campbell
- Teaching staff: 140.72 (FTE)
- Grades: 9-12
- Enrollment: 3,196 (2022-2023)
- Student to teacher ratio: 22.71
- Language: English, Spanish, Mixteco
- Campus size: 33.33 acres (13.49 ha)
- Colors: Red and white
- Athletics conference: CIF Central Section; Central Coast Athletic Association
- Mascot: Sammy the Saint
- Team name: Saints
- Newspaper: The Breeze
- Website: santamariahighschool.org

Santa Maria High School (SMHS) is a public comprehensive high school in Santa Maria, California, United States. Located in the heart of the city, Santa Maria High School is the second oldest Californian public high school still functioning on its original site. The Santa Maria Joint Union High School District was founded on June 6, 1893.

In 1996, SMHS was recognized as a California Distinguished School.

== History ==
Built originally on the corner of Broadway and Morrison in 1892, the original school house sat where the Ethel Pope Auditorium now stands. In 1920, the present school was built. The administration building and Ethel Pope Auditorium were connected and featured a bell tower. However, due to strict earthquake codes enforced after the 1971 Sylmar earthquake, portions of the school were condemned and demolished. The only original structures that remain are the Administration offices (which will later become into classrooms) and the Auditorium.

One former SMHS faculty member of note is Dean of Girls Ethel Pope. The teacher started the school newspaper, The Breeze, which first published in 1924 and is still active today.

In 2007, Santa Maria High School became a closed campus, meaning that students are not allowed outside of school grounds for lunch. The school's new cafeteria now serves meals and is a gathering place for students at lunch.

Santa Maria High School has remodeled and added on sections in recent years including a new library, pool, cafeteria, a two-story building in 2016, and a three-story building in 2023 which brought back the bell tower. Dave Boyd Field has also been renovated with a new synthetic turf and track, home stands and press box. The new stadium has been dedicated to longtime athletic director Ralph Baldiviez.

On May 28, 2016, presidential candidate Bernie Sanders held a campaign rally on campus at Dave Boyd Field.

== Athletics ==
Santa Maria High School athletic teams are nicknamed the Saints, and its mascot is Sammy the Saint. Since 2018, the school has competed in the Central Coast Athletic Association, a conference affiliated with the CIF Central Section. Previously, SMHS was a long-time member of the CIF Southern Section (CIF-SS) and the Los Padres League.

Santa Maria has earned CIF-SS championships in football, boys' and girls' basketball, boys' water polo (1991), boys soccer (2005 Division IV), and boys baseball (2017 Division VI).

Santa Maria boys soccer made it into another CIF Finals. They faced their crosstown rivals, Pioneer Valley. They defeat Pioneer Valley 2-0 in overtime and became CIF champions. (2023 Division II)

== Awards ==
- College Board 2004 Inspiration Award

== Notable alumni ==
- John Rudometkin, 1962 University of Southern California All-American and NBA player
- Abel Maldonado, politician who served as 48th Lieutenant Governor of California
- Owen W. Siler, served as 15th Commandant of United States Coast Guard from 1974 to 1978.
- Terry Hermeling, NFL offensive tackle
- Francisco Jiménez, author and Santa Clara University professor
- Steve Patterson, NBA player for Cleveland Cavaliers, two-time NCAA champion with UCLA
- Devon Brock, Professional MMA Fighter
