= Santa Maria, California =

City in California, United States

- City
- Santa Maria City Hall

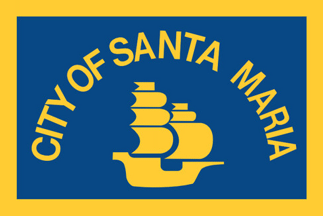
- Flag
- Nickname: BBQ Capital of Cali
- Interactive map of Santa Maria, California
- Location in Southern California Location in California Location in the United States
- Coordinates: 34°57′5″N 120°26′0″W
- Country: United States
- State: California
- County: Santa Barbara
- Metro: Santa Maria-Santa Barbara
- Founded: 1874
- Incorporated: September 12, 1905
- Chartered: December 2000

Government
  - Type: Council-manager
  - Mayor: Alice Patino
  - State Senator: Monique Limón (D)
  - Assemblymember: Gregg Hart (D)
  - U. S. Rep.: Salud Carbajal (D)

Area
  - City: 23.42 sq mi (60.65 km^{2})
  - Land: 22.81 sq mi (59.08 km^{2})
  - Water: 0.61 sq mi (1.58 km^{2}) 2.60%
  - Metro: 2,735.09 sq mi (7,083.9 km^{2})
- Elevation: 217 ft (66 m)

Population (2020)
  - City: 109,707
  - Estimate (2024): 111,346
  - Rank: 60th in California; 292nd in the United States
  - Density: 4,810.2/sq mi (1,857.24/km^{2})
  - Metro: 448,229
  - Metro density: 163.881/sq mi (63.2748/km^{2})
- Time zone: UTC−8 (Pacific)
  - Summer (DST): UTC−7 (PDT)
- ZIP codes: 93454–93458
- Area code: 805
- FIPS code: 06-69196
- GNIS feature IDs: 1652791, 2411824
- Website: cityofsantamaria.org

Santa Maria (Spanish for "St. Mary") is a city in Santa Barbara County, California, United States. Located on the Central Coast of California, it is approximately 65 miles (105 km) northwest of Santa Barbara and 150 miles (240 km) northwest of Los Angeles. Its population was 109,707 at the 2020 census. The city is notable for its wine industry and Santa Maria–style barbecue.

== History ==
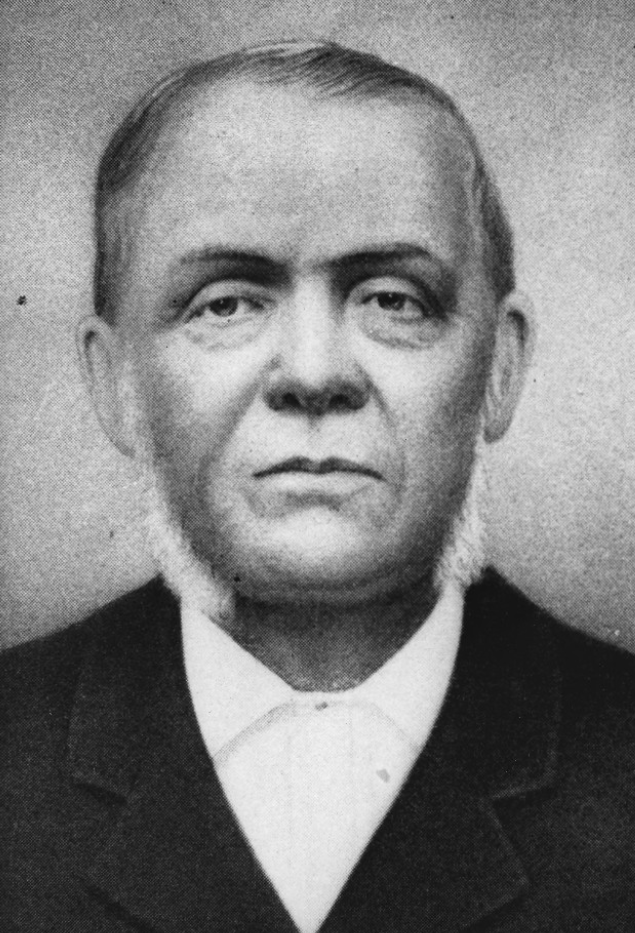
Santa Maria was named by noted Californio ranchero Juan Pacífico Ontiveros.

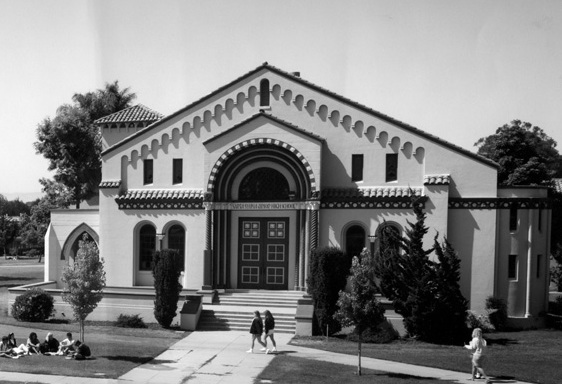
Ethel Pope Auditorium

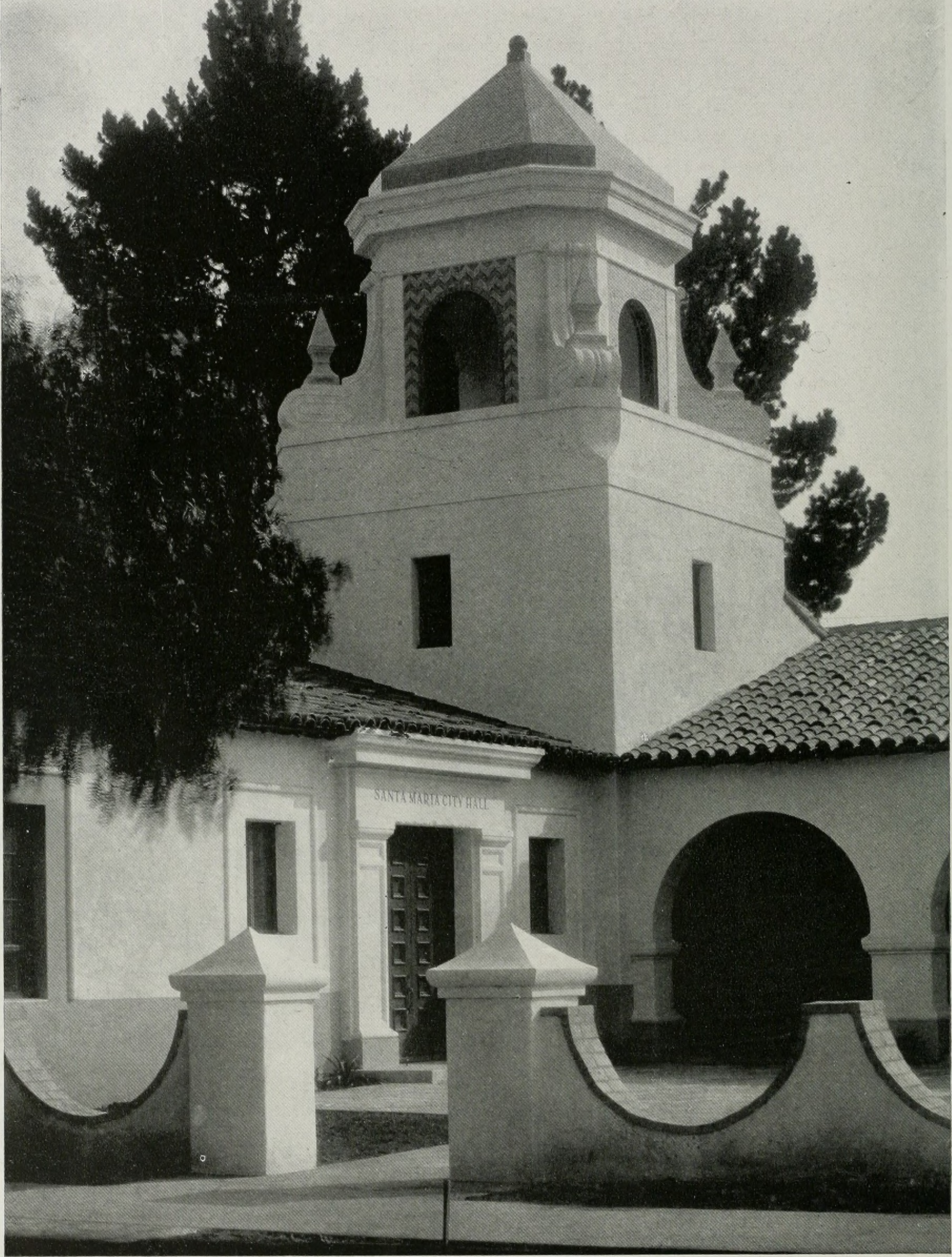
City Hall, 1934

The Santa Maria Valley, stretching from the Sierra Madre (California) Mountains toward the Pacific Ocean, was the homeland of the Chumash people for several thousand years. The Native Americans made their homes on the slopes of the surrounding hills among the oaks, on the banks of the Santa Maria River among the sycamores, and along the coast. They had unique plank-built boats, called Tomol, which they used for ocean fishing.

In 1769, the Portolá Expedition passed through the Santa Maria Valley during the first Spanish land exploration up the coast of Las Californias Province. Mission San Luis Obispo de Tolosa was established just north of the valley in 1772, and Mission La Purísima Concepción was established near present-day Lompoc in 1787. Rather than rich soil, white settlers were attracted here by the possibility of free land. In 1821, after the Mexican War of Independence, the mission lands in Santa Maria Valley were made available for private ownership under a Mexican land grant called Rancho Punta de Laguna. At the end of the Mexican War in 1848, California was ceded to the United States, and was granted statehood with the Compromise of 1850.

In the late 19th century, the area's rich soil attracted farmers and other settlers. By the end of the century, the Santa Maria River Valley had become one of the most productive agricultural areas in the state. Agriculture remains a key component of the economy for the city and the entire region.

Between 1869 and 1874, four of the valley's settlers, Rudolph Cook, John Thornburg, Isaac Fesler (for whom Fesler Jr. High School is named), and Isaac Miller (for whom Miller Elementary School is named), built their homes near each other at the present corners on Broadway and Main Street. The townsite was recorded in Santa Barbara in 1875. The new town was named Grangerville, then changed to Central City. It became Santa Maria on February 18, 1885, since mail was often being sent by mistake to Central City, Colorado. Santa Maria was chosen from the name Juan Pacifico Ontiveros had given to his property 25 years earlier. Streets named after the four settlers now form a 6-block square centered at Broadway and Main Street, the center of town.

Oil exploration began in 1888, leading to large-scale discoveries at the turn of the 20th century. In 1902, Union Oil discovered the large Orcutt Oil Field in the Solomon Hills south of town, and a number of smaller companies also began pumping oil. Two years later, Union Oil had 22 wells in production. Other significant discoveries followed, including the Lompoc Oil Field in 1903 and the Cat Canyon field in 1908. Over the next 80 years more large oil fields were found, and thousands of oil wells drilled and put into production. Oil development intensified in the 1930s, with the discovery of the Santa Maria Valley Oil Field in 1934, right underneath the southern and western parts of the city of Santa Maria, which spurred the city's growth even further. By 1957 there were 1,775 oil wells in operation in the Santa Maria Valley, producing more than $640 million worth of oil.

== Geography ==
According to the United States Census Bureau, the city has a total area of 23.4 square miles (61 km^{2}), of which 22.8 square miles (59 km^{2}) is land and 0.6 square miles (1.6 km^{2}) (2.60%) is water.

Santa Maria is situated north of the unincorporated community of Orcutt, and south of the Santa Maria River (which serves as the line between Santa Barbara and San Luis Obispo counties). The valley is bordered on the west by the Pacific Ocean and to the east by the San Rafael Mountains and the Los Padres National Forest. The city of Guadalupe is approximately 9 miles (14 km) to the west of Santa Maria.

=== Climate ===
Santa Maria experiences a cool Mediterranean climate (Köppen climate classification Csb) typical of coastal areas of California north of Point Conception. The climate is mostly sunny, refreshed by the ocean breeze. Fog is common. Snow in the mountains is seen during the winter. In the lowest parts of the city it is virtually unknown; with the last brief flurry recorded in January 1949. The only recorded earlier snowfall was in January 1882. Rainfall averages 13.32 in (338 mm) annually; however as is typical for the region it is very variable, with actual falls ranging from just 4.25 in (108 mm) in the "rain year" from July 1971 to June 1972, to 32.56 in (827 mm) between July 1997 and June 1998. The wettest month on record has been January 1995 with 11.78 in (299 mm) , and the wettest day February 10, 1938, when 3.55 in (90 mm) fell in 24 hours. The record high temperature of 110 °F (43.3 °C) was observed on June 20, 2008, while the record low of 20 °F (−6.7 °C) was observed twice: on January 2, 1976, and December 7, 1978.

Climate data for Santa Maria Public Airport, California (1991–2020, extremes 1948–present)
| Month | Jan | Feb | Mar | Apr | May | Jun | Jul | Aug | Sep | Oct | Nov | Dec | Year |
|---|---|---|---|---|---|---|---|---|---|---|---|---|---|
| Record high °F (°C) | 89 (32) | 89 (32) | 95 (35) | 103 (39) | 105 (41) | 110 (43) | 104 (40) | 104 (40) | 106 (41) | 108 (42) | 96 (36) | 90 (32) | 110 (43) |
| Mean maximum °F (°C) | 77.2 (25.1) | 79.1 (26.2) | 79.8 (26.6) | 85.4 (29.7) | 84.1 (28.9) | 85.2 (29.6) | 85.6 (29.8) | 85.5 (29.7) | 90.1 (32.3) | 91.8 (33.2) | 84.4 (29.1) | 76.2 (24.6) | 96.9 (36.1) |
| Mean daily maximum °F (°C) | 64.7 (18.2) | 64.8 (18.2) | 66.3 (19.1) | 68.1 (20.1) | 69.3 (20.7) | 71.3 (21.8) | 73.3 (22.9) | 73.8 (23.2) | 75.0 (23.9) | 74.6 (23.7) | 70.0 (21.1) | 64.3 (17.9) | 69.6 (20.9) |
| Daily mean °F (°C) | 52.8 (11.6) | 53.6 (12.0) | 55.3 (12.9) | 56.7 (13.7) | 59.0 (15.0) | 61.5 (16.4) | 64.1 (17.8) | 64.5 (18.1) | 64.3 (17.9) | 62.2 (16.8) | 57.1 (13.9) | 52.2 (11.2) | 58.6 (14.8) |
| Mean daily minimum °F (°C) | 41.0 (5.0) | 42.5 (5.8) | 44.3 (6.8) | 45.4 (7.4) | 48.7 (9.3) | 51.6 (10.9) | 53.8 (12.1) | 54.2 (12.3) | 53.7 (12.1) | 49.8 (9.9) | 44.3 (6.8) | 40.1 (4.5) | 47.4 (8.6) |
| Mean minimum °F (°C) | 29.8 (−1.2) | 31.3 (−0.4) | 34.2 (1.2) | 35.5 (1.9) | 39.7 (4.3) | 43.8 (6.6) | 48.6 (9.2) | 48.7 (9.3) | 45.9 (7.7) | 40.1 (4.5) | 33.1 (0.6) | 28.7 (−1.8) | 27.1 (−2.7) |
| Record low °F (°C) | 20 (−7) | 22 (−6) | 24 (−4) | 28 (−2) | 27 (−3) | 35 (2) | 41 (5) | 40 (4) | 32 (0) | 26 (−3) | 21 (−6) | 20 (−7) | 20 (−7) |
| Average precipitation inches (mm) | 2.74 (70) | 2.85 (72) | 2.56 (65) | 0.93 (24) | 0.36 (9.1) | 0.06 (1.5) | 0.03 (0.76) | 0.01 (0.25) | 0.07 (1.8) | 0.54 (14) | 1.12 (28) | 2.05 (52) | 13.32 (338) |
| Average precipitation days (≥ 0.01 in) | 7.7 | 8.7 | 8.1 | 4.3 | 1.6 | 0.6 | 0.4 | 0.5 | 1.1 | 3.0 | 5.2 | 6.9 | 48.1 |
| Average relative humidity (%) | 65.4 | 72.7 | 75.7 | 75.6 | 78.9 | 79.3 | 81.2 | 79.9 | 80.5 | 74.7 | 71.3 | 70.8 | 75.5 |
Source: NOAA (relative humidity 1961–1990)

== Demographics ==
Historical population
| Census | Pop. | Note | %± |
|---|---|---|---|
| 1910 | 2,260 | | — |
| 1920 | 3,943 | | 74.5% |
| 1930 | 7,057 | | 79.0% |
| 1940 | 8,522 | | 20.8% |
| 1950 | 10,440 | | 22.5% |
| 1960 | 20,027 | | 91.8% |
| 1970 | 32,749 | | 63.5% |
| 1980 | 39,685 | | 21.2% |
| 1990 | 61,284 | | 54.4% |
| 2000 | 77,423 | | 26.3% |
| 2010 | 99,553 | | 28.6% |
| 2020 | 109,707 | | 10.2% |
U.S. Decennial Census; 1860–1870 1880-1890; 1900 1910 1920; 1930 1940 1950; 1960 1970 1980; 1990 2000 2010; 2020

=== 2020 ===
Santa Maria city, California – Racial and ethnic composition Note: the US Census treats Hispanic/Latino as an ethnic category. This table excludes Latinos from the racial categories and assigns them to a separate category. Hispanics/Latinos may be of any race.
| Race / Ethnicity (NH = Non-Hispanic) | Pop 2000 | Pop 2010 | Pop 2020 | % 2000 | % 2010 | % 2020 |
|---|---|---|---|---|---|---|
| White alone (NH) | 24,742 | 21,626 | 16,758 | 31.96% | 21.72% | 15.28% |
| Black or African American alone (NH) | 1,246 | 1,193 | 1,043 | 1.61% | 1.20% | 0.95% |
| Native American or Alaska Native alone (NH) | 390 | 345 | 322 | 0.50% | 0.35% | 0.29% |
| Asian alone (NH) | 3,406 | 4,652 | 4,999 | 4.40% | 4.67% | 4.56% |
| Pacific Islander alone (NH) | 109 | 132 | 96 | 0.14% | 0.13% | 0.09% |
| Other Race alone (NH) | 68 | 157 | 504 | 0.09% | 0.16% | 0.46% |
| Mixed race or Multiracial (NH) | 1,266 | 1,334 | 2,017 | 1.64% | 1.34% | 1.84% |
| Hispanic or Latino (any race) | 46,196 | 70,114 | 83,968 | 59.67% | 70.43% | 76.54% |
| Total | 77,423 | 99,553 | 109,707 | 100.00% | 100.00% | 100.00% |

=== 2010 ===
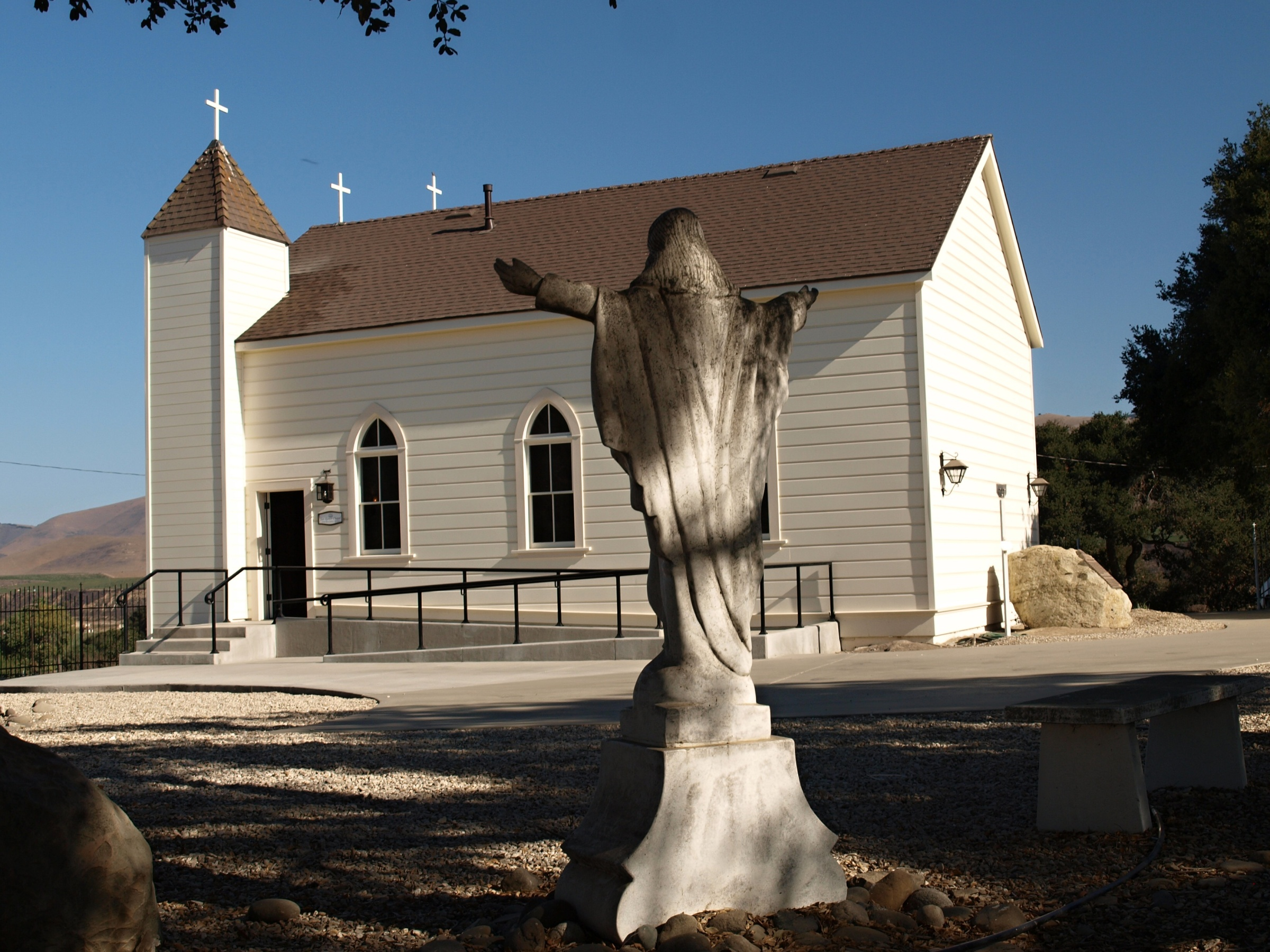
Chapel of San Ramon

The 2010 United States census reported that Santa Maria had a population of 99,553. The population density was 4,255.3 inhabitants per square mile (1,643.0/km^{2}). The racial makeup of Santa Maria was 55,983 (56.2%) White, 1,656 (1.7%) African American, 1,818 (1.8%) Native American, 5,054 (5.1%) Asian, 161 (0.2%) Pacific Islander, 29,841 (30.0%) from other races, and 5,040 (5.1%) from two or more races. Hispanic or Latino of any race were 70,114 persons (70.4%).

The Census reported that 98,546 people (99.0% of the population) lived in households, 588 (0.6%) lived in noninstitutionalized group quarters, and 419 (0.4%) were institutionalized.

There were 26,908 households, out of which 13,223 (49.1%) had children under the age of 18 living in them, 14,616 (54.3%) were opposite-sex married couples living together, 3,962 (14.7%) had a female householder with no husband present, 1,901 (7.1%) had a male householder with no wife present. There were 1,754 (6.5%) unmarried opposite-sex partnerships, and 190 (0.7%) same-sex married couples or partnerships. 5,079 households (18.9%) were made up of individuals, and 2,431 (9.0%) had someone living alone who was 65 years of age or older. The average household size was 3.66. There were 20,479 families (76.1% of all households); the average family size was 4.06.

The population was spread out, with 31,302 people (31.4%) under the age of 18, 12,170 people (12.2%) aged 18 to 24, 28,486 people (28.6%) aged 25 to 44, 18,204 people (18.3%) aged 45 to 64, and 9,391 people (9.4%) who were 65 years of age or older. The median age was 28.6 years. For every 100 females, there were 102.2 males. For every 100 females age 18 and over, there were 100.7 males.

There were 28,294 housing units at an average density of 1,209.4 units per square mile (467.0 units/km^{2}), of which 13,893 (51.6%) were owner-occupied, and 13,015 (48.4%) were occupied by renters. The homeowner vacancy rate was 1.9%; the rental vacancy rate was 3.8%. 46,463 people (46.7% of the population) lived in owner-occupied housing units and 52,083 people (52.3%) lived in rental housing units.

=== 2000 ===
According to the 2000 census, there were 77,423 people, 22,146 households, and 16,653 families residing in the city. The population density was 4,005.8 inhabitants per square mile (1,546.6/km^{2}). There were 22,847 housing units at an average density of 1,182.1 units per square mile (456.4 units/km^{2}). The racial makeup of the city was 58.1% White, 1.9% African American, 1.8% Native American, 4.7% Asian, 0.18% Pacific Islander, 28.02% from other races, and 5.36% from two or more races. Hispanic or Latino of any race were 59.7% of the population.

There were 22,146 households, out of which 42% had children under the age of 18 living with them, 56.4% were married couples living together, 13.3% had a female householder with no husband present, and 24.8% were non-families. 20.0% of all households were made up of individuals, and 9.3% had someone living alone who was 65 years of age or older. The average household size was 3.40 and the average family size was 3.85.

In the city, the population was spread out, with 31.6% under the age of 18, 11.6% from 18 to 24, 29.5% from 25 to 44, 15.9% from 45 to 64, and 11.3% who were 65 years of age or older. The median age was 29 years. For every 100 females, there were 103.2 males. For every 100 females age 18 and over, there were 101.6 males.

The median income for a household in the city was $51,739, and the median income for a family was $48,233. Males had a median income of $28,700 versus $22,364 for females. The per capita income for the city was $13,780. About 15.5% of families and 19.7% of the population were below the poverty line, including 26.5% of those under age 18 and 7.7% of those age 65 or over.

== Economy ==
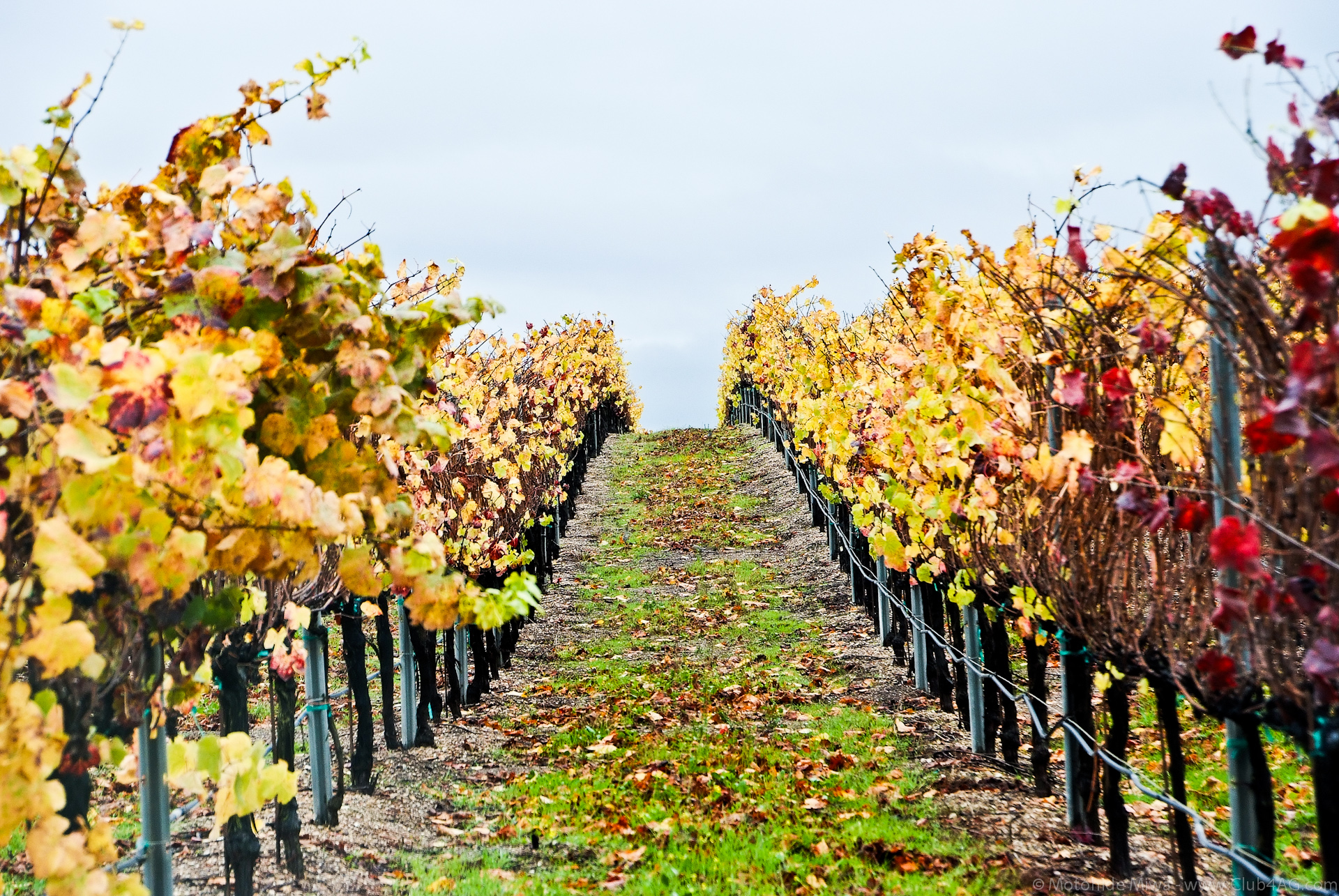
Vineyards in the Santa Maria Valley AVA

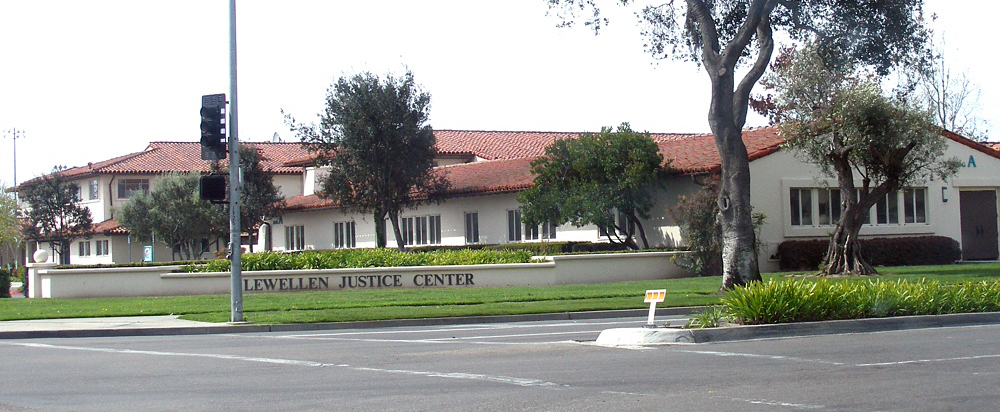
Lewellen Justice Center

Agriculture plays an important role in the city's economy. The Santa Maria area is home to an increasing number of vineyards, wineries and winemakers and is centrally located to both the Santa Ynez and Foxen Canyon areas of Santa Barbara County's wine country, and San Luis Obispo County's Edna Valley-Arroyo Grande wine country.

The agricultural areas surrounding the city are some of the most productive in California, with primary crops including strawberries, wine grapes, celery, lettuce, peas, squash, cauliflower, spinach, broccoli and beans. Many cattle ranchers also call the Santa Maria Valley home. Farmworkers in Santa Barbara County earn an average hourly wage of ~$17/hr in 2024.

Two of the city's major retail centers, the Crossroads, completed in 1999, and the historic Enos Ranch site, still under development, are both situated adjacent to the U.S. Route 101/Betteravia Road interchange and feature several prominent big-box stores. The city is also home to the Santa Maria Town Center, the only enclosed shopping mall in Santa Barbara County and the largest on the Central Coast, located at the junction of Broadway and Main Street.

Santa Maria also features the historic Santa Maria Inn, located on South Broadway; originally built in 1917 by Frank McCoy, it is a registered historic landmark and features a wide range of amenities. Several famous guests have stayed at this inn, including Charlie Chaplin, Rudolph Valentino, Bette Davis, Bing Crosby, and Herbert Hoover.

In recent years, other industries have been added to the city's agricultural and retail mix, including: aerospace; communications; high-tech research and development; energy production; military operations; and manufacturing.

The petroleum industry has long had a large presence in the area, since oil was first discovered at the Orcutt Oil Field in 1902. By 1957, there were 1,775 oil wells in operation in the Santa Maria Valley, producing more than $640 million worth of oil.

=== Top employers ===
According to the city's 2019 Comprehensive Annual Financial Report, the top employers in the city are:

| # | Employer | # of Employees |
|---|---|---|
| 1 | Vandenberg Space Force Base | 6,700 |
| 2 | Santa Maria-Bonita School District | 2,100 |
| 3 | Marian Regional Medical Center | 1,920 |
| 4 | Allan Hancock College | 1,480 |
| 5 | C&D Zodiac Aerospace | 915 |
| 6 | Santa Maria Joint Union High School District | 805 |
| 7 | Windset Farms | 750 |
| 8 | City of Santa Maria | 586 |
| 9 | Walmart | 440 |
| 10 | Agro-Jal Farms | 420 |

== Arts and culture ==
=== Tri-tip and Santa Maria-style barbecue ===
Tri-tip on the grill, with a saucepan of beans and loaves of sourdough bread

Santa Maria-style barbecue is a regional culinary tradition rooted in the Santa Maria Valley. The tri-tip steak has its roots in Santa Maria. Tri-tip is a cut of beef from the bottom sirloin. It is a small triangular muscle, usually 1.5 to 2.5 lb (680 to 1,130 g) per side of beef. In the United States, this cut was typically used for ground beef or sliced into steaks until the late 1950s, when it became a local specialty in Santa Maria. "Santa Maria-style" barbecue is usually used in reference to the seasoning of tri-tip or other meats (most notably top sirloin, or "top block") when rubbed with salt, pepper, and spices and cooked whole on a rotisserie or grilled over local red oak wood. The side dishes complementing a typical "Santa Maria-style" barbecue generally consist of garlic bread, pinquito beans, and a salad.

According to Food & Wine, Santa Maria–style barbecue is “one of the state’s most iconic regional specialties. Today, it is considered a central part of the region’s cultural identity and has been recognized as one of California’s most historically significant barbecue traditions.

Sunset Magazine's August 2013 issue features a 10-page spread on Santa Maria Style BBQ, crowning Santa Maria as "The West's Best BBQ Town".

=== Wine ===
Santa Maria, along with the neighboring Lompoc, Los Alamos and Santa Ynez Valleys, combine to create one of the nation's largest wine-producing regions, referred to as the Santa Barbara Wine Country.

The often foggy and windswept Santa Maria Valley is the northernmost appellation in Santa Barbara County. The region's first officially approved American Viticultural Area (AVA) enjoys extremely complex soil conditions and diverse microclimates. Chardonnay and Pinot noir are two varietals which especially benefit from the ocean's influence, and are the flagship wines of this appellation.

Santa Maria Valley grapes are also used by wineries throughout Santa Barbara County and at many wineries outside of the county. The Santa Maria Valley name is used on labels from wineries that are based far away from the Santa Barbara County sunshine. The Santa Maria Valley appellation is bounded by the San Rafael Mountains and the Los Padres National Forest to the east, and by the Solomon Hills and the city of Santa Maria to the west.

=== Theatre ===
Santa Maria's Allan Hancock College is the home of The Pacific Conservatory of the Performing Arts (PCPA), a theatrical school and production company. Notable alumni include: Robin Williams, Kathy Bates, Kelly McGillis, Mercedes Ruehl, Scott Aukerman, and Zac Efron. An additional PCPA theatre is located in Solvang, California in the Santa Ynez Valley.

Santa Maria is also home to one large indoor Regal Edwards movie theater, located in the Town Center Mall.

Santa Maria also has a small community theatre, the Santa Maria Civic Theatre which is located on the northwest side of town.

=== Celebrations ===
In the year 2017, the first ever Pride celebration was held in the city of Santa Maria. This was the first recorded pride celebration in the city's history. Organized by HOPE (House of Pride and Equality) in collaboration with Future Leaders of America, the festival took place in the town center west parking lot lasting 5 hours and held many activities for the community at large spanning from dancing, face painting, salsa classes, cabaret, and games. The Celebration had guest speakers ranging from Rep. Salud Carbajal, D-Santa Barbara, and Alma Hernandez, who represented 3rd District County Supervisor Joan Hartmann's office. This inaugural Pride celebration paved way for this event to take place every year following, even during the pandemic with a virtual celebration. HOPE (House of Pride and Equality) plan it every year in tandem with many community organizers in hopes to foster a sense of love and community for Santa Maria's LGBTQ+ residents and beyond.

== Parks and recreation ==
Santa Maria Fairpark, located at Stowell Road and Thornburg Street, is home to the annual Santa Barbara County Fair, which began in 1891. It is also home to the annual Strawberry Festival, in addition to a wide variety of other events, concerts, and conventions.

The Paul Nelson Aquatic Center offers an Olympic-size competition pool, as well as a recreational pool with a fan-shaped zero-depth entryway. It offers swim lessons and a swim club, and in the summer it is open to the public. In the main building, it has a basketball court, an art room, and a snack room. It also has two Santa Maria style BBQ sets and a baseball field.

Waller Park is a 154-acre park located at the south end of Santa Maria, featuring two large duck ponds with water fountains, several playgrounds, picnic and sports areas, a hiking trail, and a frisbee golf course. The first parcels of land that would become Waller Park were donated by the Santa Maria Golf and Country Club in 1928, and the remainder of the land was purchased in 1964 and 1967.

Preisker Park, located at the north end, is home to large open fields, a disc golf course, playgrounds and picnic areas. Its main feature is the large pond with a small replica of the Santa Maria ship, which children can play on.

The Santa Maria Skate Park is located in Fletcher Park. There is also the Paul Nelson Aquatic Center/Abel Maldonado Community Youth Center. Rotary Centennial Park has a basketball court, a baseball field, a large open grass area, and two playgrounds. Each year, the Annual Free Family Kite Festival organized by the Santa Maria Valley Discovery Museum is held there.

== Government ==
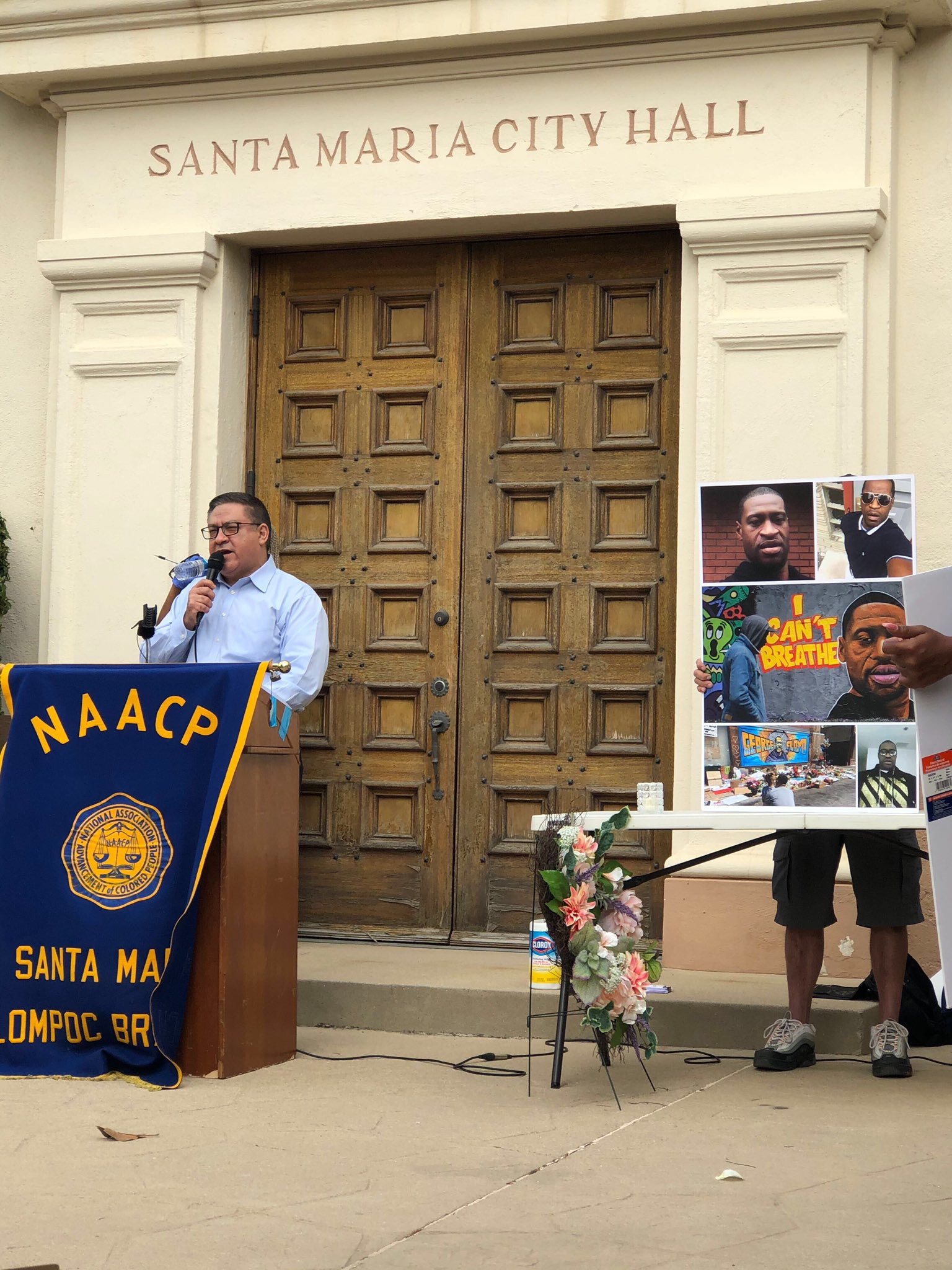
U.S. House Representative Salud Carbajal gives a speech outside of Santa Maria City Hall, calling for police reform in the wake of the murder of George Floyd.

Santa Maria's government is split down the middle of the political spectrum, in contrast to Santa Barbara, which tends to be more liberal. Due in part to this political division, plus irrigation and water-supply issues, many attempts have been made to divide the county, the northern portion from Point Conception upwards to become Mission County. Thus far the movement has been unsuccessful. Nationally, Santa Maria is a reliably Democratic stronghold, having voted for the Democratic candidate for the past six elections, as of 2020.

== Education ==
=== School districts ===
The Santa Maria Joint Union High School District (SMJUHSD) is the oldest high school district in the State of California and runs the three primary public high schools in the area: Santa Maria High School, Pioneer Valley High School, and Ernest Righetti High School. The Santa Maria-Bonita School District is home to 16,900 students in 17 elementary schools (K-6th grade) and four junior high schools (7th-8th grade). The schools in the Santa Maria-Bonita School District serve students who live within the city limits of Santa Maria, the county area of Tanglewood and the county area just outside Santa Maria heading toward Guadalupe. There are also four notable private schools in the valley: St. Joseph High School, St. Mary's Catholic School, Valley Christian Academy, and Pacific Christian School (K-6th grade).

The Orcutt Union School District serves students who live in the unincorporated community of Orcutt and serves students in grades K through 12.

=== Allan Hancock College ===
Allan Hancock College is a California public community college located in northern Santa Barbara County. Allan Hancock College was ranked as one of the five best community colleges in California and one of the nation's top 120 community colleges. Approximately 11,500 credit students enroll each semester at one of the college's four locations in Santa Maria, Lompoc, Solvang, or at Vandenberg Space Force Base. The main campus is in a 105-acre park in Santa Maria. Allan Hancock College is known for its distinguished athletic programs which have included former head football coaches John Madden and Ernie Zampese, as well as Gunther Cunningham. The college is also home to the Pacific Conservatory of the Performing Arts, one of the state's finest theatre programs.

Santa Maria is also home to Santa Barbara Business College, which has been serving the community since 1982.

== Media ==
=== Television ===
The following TV stations broadcast in Santa Barbara, San Luis Obispo, and Santa Maria Television Market Area:

- KEYT 3, an ABC/CBS/MNTV television affiliate;
- KSBY 6, an NBC television affiliate; broadcast from San Luis Obispo
- KCOY 12, a Telemundo television affiliate; broadcast from Santa Maria
- KKFX 24, a FOX television affiliate; license to San Luis Obispo studios broadcast from KCOY in Santa Maria. Also seen on cable channel 11.
- KTAS 33, a TeleXitos affiliate; broadcast from San Luis Obispo
- KPMR 38, a Univision affiliate

=== Radio ===
- 1240 KSMA News/Talk
- 1380 KVSM "Mario 1380" Regional Mexican
- 1410 KTNK Classic Country
- 1440 KUHL News/Talk
- 1480 KSBQ "La Mexicana"Ranchera
- 1600 KTAP "Radio Ranchito Regional Mexican
- 88.9 KXWB "La Nueva Radio Vision" "Spanish Christian Talk"
- 89.7 KCLM NPR operated by Cal Lutheran
- 90.5 KGDP "Family Life Radio" Contemporary Christian
- 91.5 KRQZ "RadioU" Christian Rock
- 94.1 KLMM "Radio Lazer" Regional Mexican
- 95.7 KPAT "The Beat" CHR-Rhythmic
- 96.7 KSYV "Mix 96.7" Adult Contemporary
- 97.1 KRTO Rhythmic Oldies
- 99.1 KXFM "Old School 99.1 FM" Rhythmic Oldies
- 100.3 KRQK, "La Ley" Regional Mexican Lompoc.
- 102.5 KSNI "Sunny Country" Country
- 103.3 KRUZ Classic Hits Broadcast from Santa Barbara, California
- 104.1 KBOX "Pirate Radio" Adult Hits
- 105.1 KIDI "La Buena" Regional Mexican
- 106.7 KSMY "La Mejor" Spanish Oldies

== Infrastructure ==
=== Transportation ===
==== Roads ====
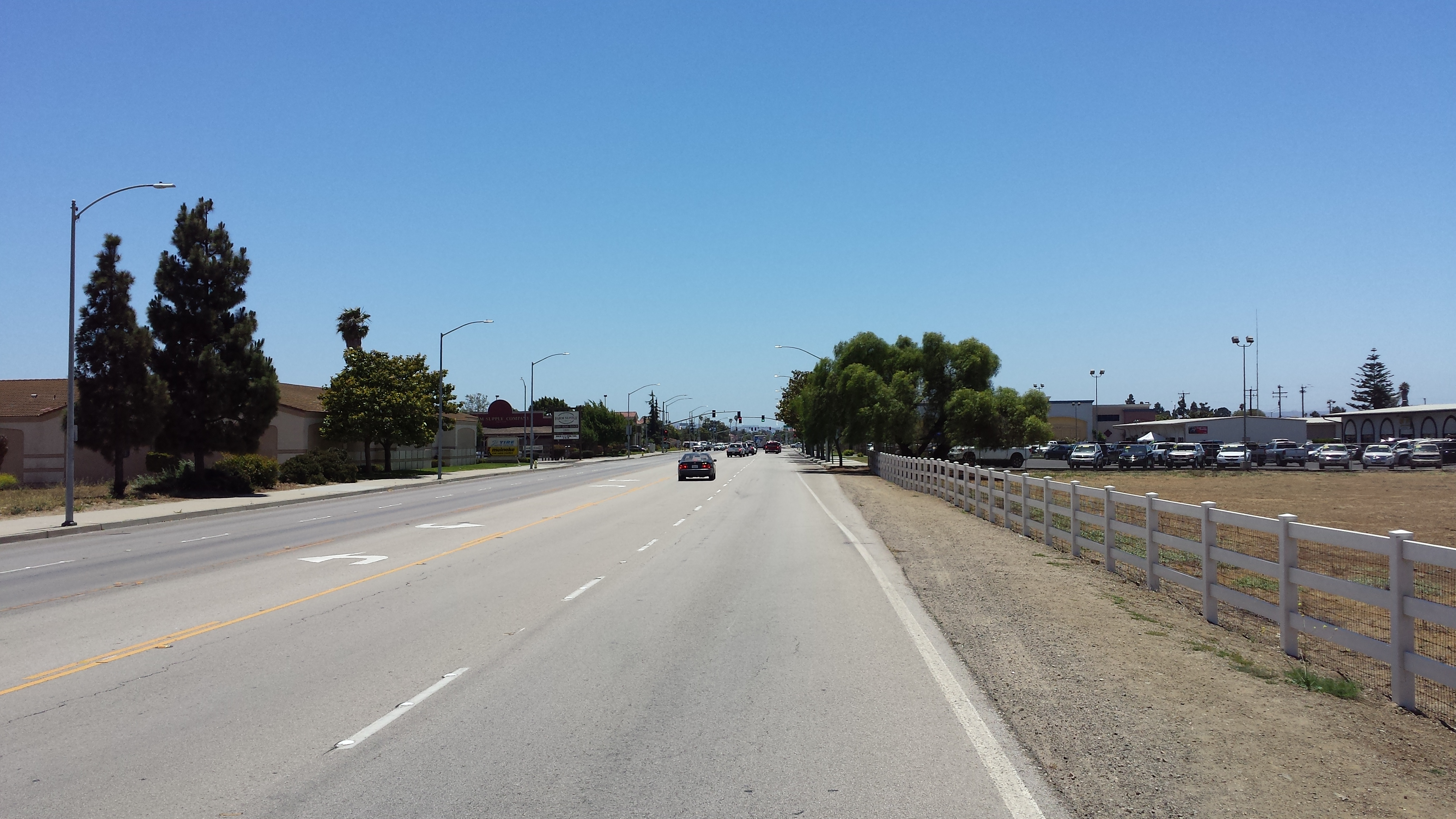
Route 135 as Broadway in Santa Maria near its northern terminus, looking southbound, June 2014

US 101 runs through the middle of the Santa Maria Valley and is the main freeway connecting many West Coast cities. It has been improved to freeway status (meaning all at-grade intersections have been eliminated) within the city of Santa Maria itself. A $32 million widening project that expanded the freeway from four to six lanes between Santa Maria Way and the Highway 166 exit was completed by early 2009.

SR 1 runs around the western edge of the city and connects it to nearby Vandenberg Space Force Base near Lompoc. The section of US 101 in the city is a freeway, and a small part of a nearby section of Highway 1 that runs between the city and the base is also a freeway, but the two freeway segments do not directly connect to each other.

SR 135 is considered to be the major artery through the city. It comes from Los Alamos, a town to the south of Santa Maria, and it enters Orcutt and Santa Maria as an expressway. The expressway runs all the way to Santa Maria Way. Highway 135 then turns into Broadway and runs through the heart of the city and all the way up to the Santa Maria River and U.S. 101.

==== Rail ====
The Santa Maria Valley Railroad is a shortline freight railroad to Guadalupe where the Union Pacific Railroad Interchange point is. Main business includes storage of railroad cars when northern California and southern California storage area are full. In the 1990s, the city proposed a light rail service to replace the Santa Maria Valley's right-of-way, as its future was uncertain.

The nearest train station with long-distance Amtrak service is in Guadalupe, to which Amtrak provides bus service from Santa Maria. Amtrak's Pacific Surfliner provides twice daily service in each direction, running to San Luis Obispo to the north and to San Diego via Los Angeles to the south.

Amtrak Thruway 18 provides a daily connection to/from 205 South Nicholson Street to Visalia, with several stops in between.

==== Bus ====
SMRT, Santa Maria Regional Transit, is the city operated bus service operating both local and regional lines. It operates local city bus service, as well as regional service to the Santa Ynez Valley, Lompoc, Vandenberg Space Force Base, Guadalupe, San Luis Obispo, and New Cuyama. RTA Route 10 connects Santa Maria and San Luis Obispo.

Long-distance intercity bus service is provided by Greyhound Lines. The Clean Air Express commuter bus runs between Santa Maria and Goleta as well as a line to Santa Barbara weekdays.

==== Airport ====
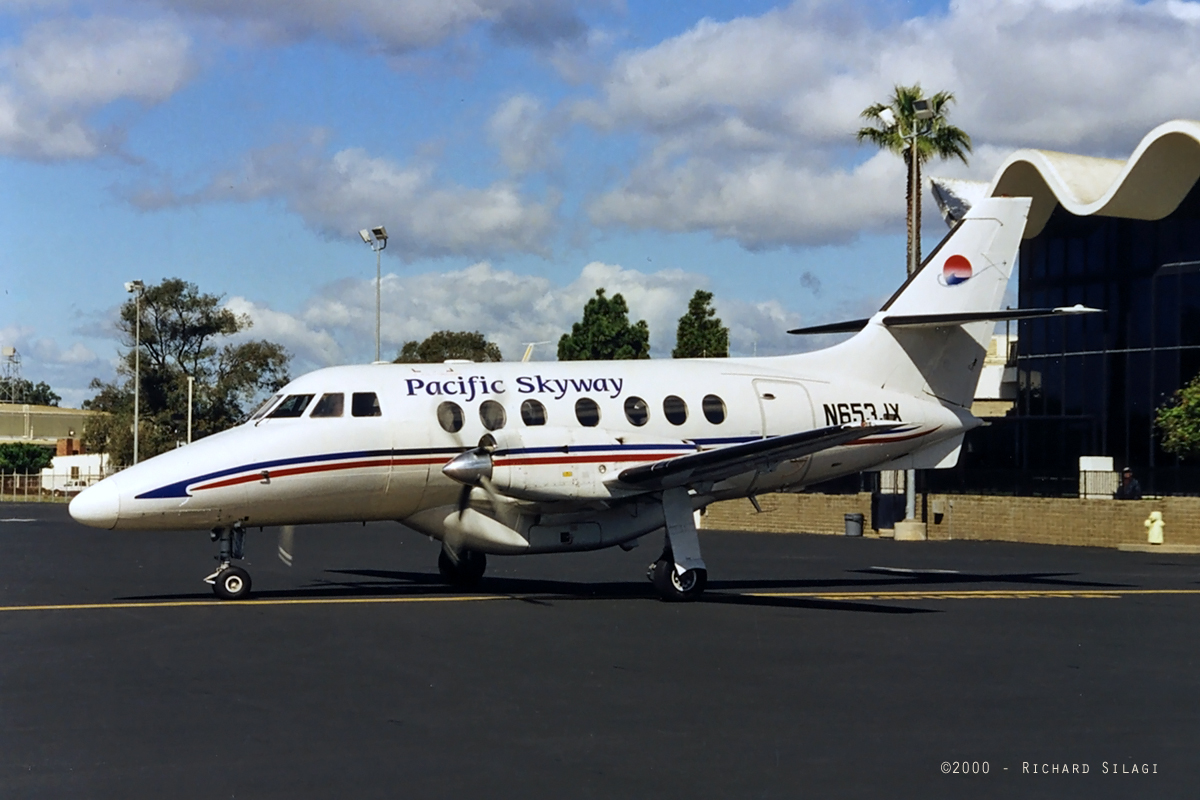
Santa Maria Public Airport

The Santa Maria Public Airport is served by Allegiant Air, flying to Las Vegas, and American Eagle, to Phoenix.

=== Courts ===
Santa Maria is home to one of three official Superior Court locations in Santa Barbara County, with the other courthouse located in Santa Barbara. From 2003 to 2005, the Superior Court handled a felony complaint against Michael Jackson (see Michael Jackson: 2005 trial) which reached a not guilty verdict on June 13, 2005. The District Attorney chose to present the trial in Santa Maria due to its close proximity from Neverland Ranch where the alleged incident took place.

=== Law enforcement ===
As the primary law enforcement agency for the City of Santa Maria, the Santa Maria Police Department handles approximately 130,000 calls for service each year. The Santa Barbara County Sheriff's Office also operates within the city in addition to the Santa Maria Park Officers who consist of 6 sworn officers who derive their authority under CA Penal code section 831.31(b). The SMPD is administratively divided into the three divisions, Administration, Operations, and Support, and has 111 sworn officers and 49 full-time support personnel.

== Notable people ==
=== Entertainment ===
- Kathy Bates, actress
- Gary Coleman, actor
- Nino Del Pesco, musician
- Myriam Gurba, writer
- Francisco Jiménez, writer and professor at Santa Clara University
- Chris Lambert, musician, podcaster
- Beverlee McKinsey, actress
- Kim Miyori, actress
- Joe Nanini, musician
- Chuck Negron, founding member of Three Dog Night
- Jane Russell, actress
- Aurora Snow, writer, former pornographic actress and director
- Chet Helms, music promoter

=== Sports ===
- Mark Brunell, former NFL football player
- Elijah Cooks, NFL football player
- Paco Craig, football player
- Gunther Cunningham, former head football coach of NFL's Kansas City Chiefs
- Carlos Dias, former Major League Baseball pitcher
- Blaine Johnson, former NHRA Top Fuel driver
- Jim Lonborg, former Major League Baseball player
- John Madden, Hall of Fame NFL football coach and commentator
- Josh Prenot, Rio Olympics 2016 Olympic swimmer medalist from SMSC
- John Rudometkin, USC and NBA basketball player, first-round pick of 1962 NBA draft
- Marla Runyan, marathon runner
- Bryn Smith, retired Major League Baseball pitcher who played for both Santa Maria High School and Allan Hancock College
- Jim Steels, MLB player
- Robin Ventura, former Major League Baseball player and manager best remember for his time with the Chicago White Sox and New York Mets
- Jimy Williams, Major League Baseball manager
- Ernie Zampese, NFL football coach
- Ken Zampese, NFL football coach

=== Politics ===
- Abel Maldonado, former Lieutenant Governor of California

=== Other ===
- William Kraemer Coblentz, attorney and politician
- George Allan Hancock, philanthropist, oil, railroad and aviation engineer.
- James Lamar McElhany, President of the General Conference of Seventh-day Adventists from 1936 to 1950
- Inga Muscio, author and activist
- Owen W. Siler, 15th Commandant of the United States Coast Guard (1974–1978)
- Carol Sklenicka, literary biographer

== In popular culture ==
In the Space: 1999 episode "Another Time, Another Place", the "Earth" Alphans, during their period on Earth, have built a small village in the destroyed Santa Maria, discovering that on Earth there was an Atlantis-like civilization.

In the 1995 film Nick of Time, the main character, Gene Watson, who is played by Johnny Depp, is from Santa Maria, CA.
