= Point Sal State Beach =

Beach in Santa Barbara County, California, USA

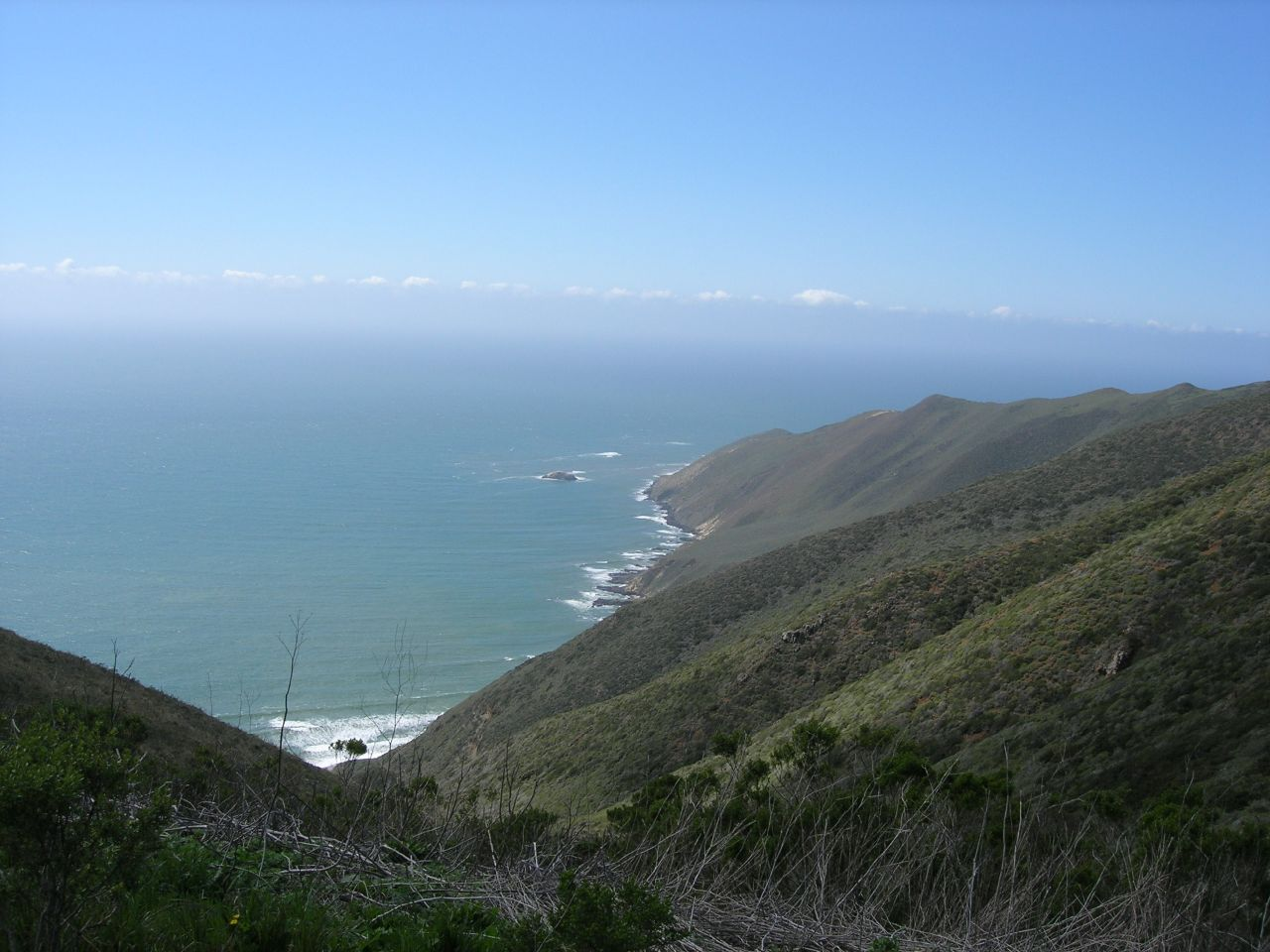
- Point Sal ridgeline at Point Sal State Beach. Point Sal is at the end of the ridge.

- Location within California Location within the United States
- Location: Guadalupe, California
- Coordinates: 34.902311°N 120.654622°W
- Area: 80 acres (320,000 m^{2})
- Named for: Hermenegildo Sal
- Governing body: California Department of Parks and Recreation
- Website: https://www.parks.ca.gov/?page_id=605

Point Sal State Beach is a beach on the Pacific coast of California, located near the city of Guadalupe, in the northwestern part of Santa Barbara County. There are approximately 80 acres (320,000 m^{2}) of property with 1.5 miles (2.4 km) of ocean frontage. The rocks around the headland constitute part of the Coast Range Ophiolite, one of the largest ophiolite terranes in the world. This beach is at risk of landslides as there are rocky shorelines and extremely steep slopes.

Among the most popular activities are fishing, beach combing, hiking, nature study, photography, picnicking and sunbathing. Swimming is not recommended due to dangerous rip currents, absence of lifeguard service, and occasional shark sightings. There are also no recreational facilities (toilets, picnic tables, etc.) Camping is prohibited due to security concerns involving Vandenberg Space Force Base. Camping can be subject to citation, arrest, and eviction by the Park Rangers and/or the 30th Security Forces Squadron.

== History ==
In 1792, British explorer George Vancouver discovered Point Sal and decided to name it after Hermenegildo Sal, then the commandant of San Francisco.

In the 1800s, Joel Clayton acquired 1,000 acres (400 ha) of land surrounding Point Sal. When Clayton's daughter married, he presented the land to the new couple as a wedding gift. The newly married couple arrived in the region in 1868 with the goal of developing the land surrounding the point.

In 1871, a wharf was built and, from 1872 to 1873, Point Sal was briefly the largest shipping destination that lay south of San Francisco. In 1877, the wharf was destroyed by rough seas and, due to development at other nearby ports, was never rebuilt.

In 1940, the state of California acquired the land and converted the area into a state park. In 1941, Vandenberg Air Force Base was founded nearby and, as the base has grown, the United States Air Force has periodically restricted or imposed conditions on access to the beach.

== Wildlife ==
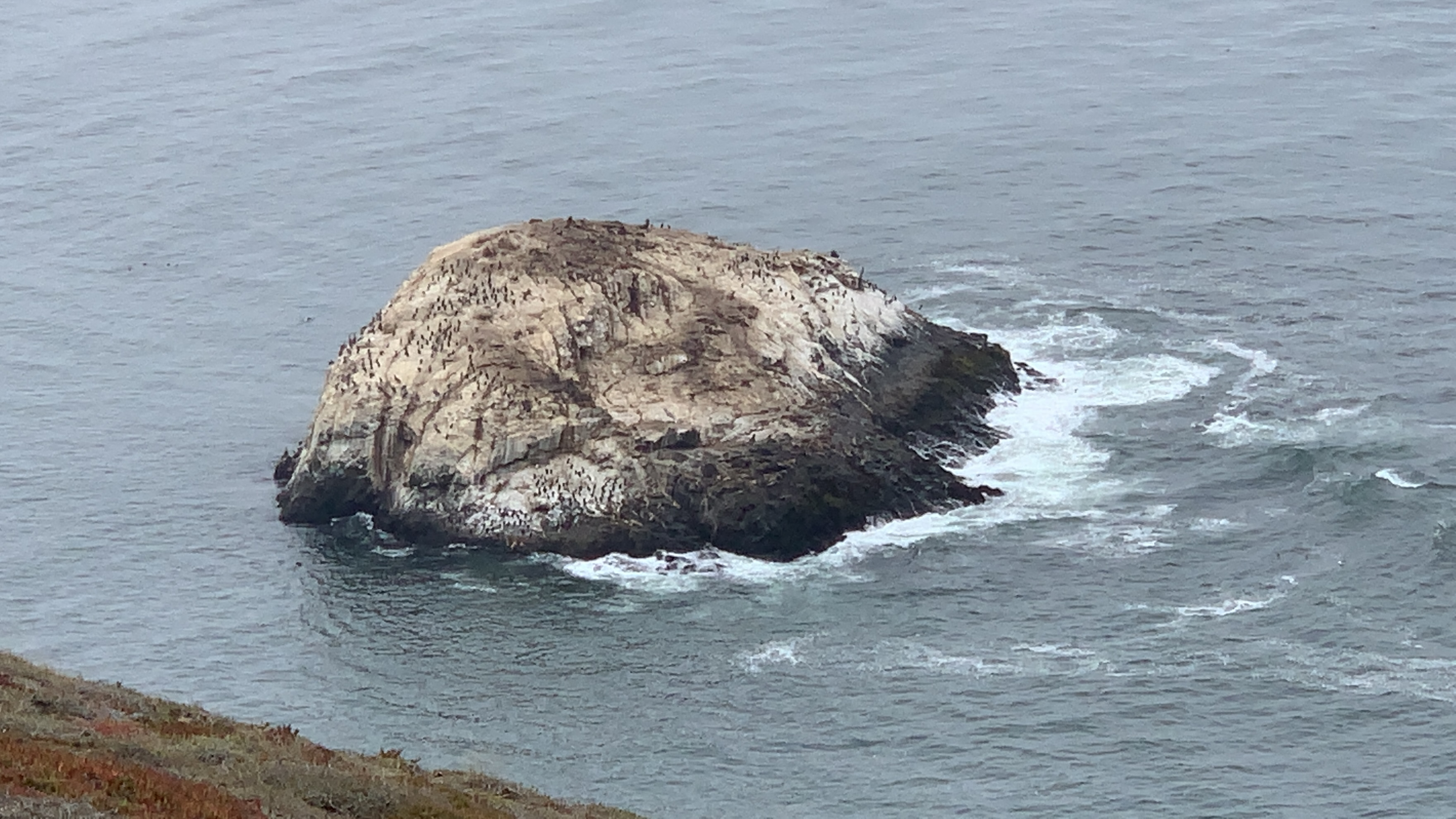
Lion Rock with marine life (primarily seals) covering it.

Point Sal hosts a wide range of wildlife and fauna, including more than 300 native plant species and multiple types of seals, sea lions, and otters.

== Access ==
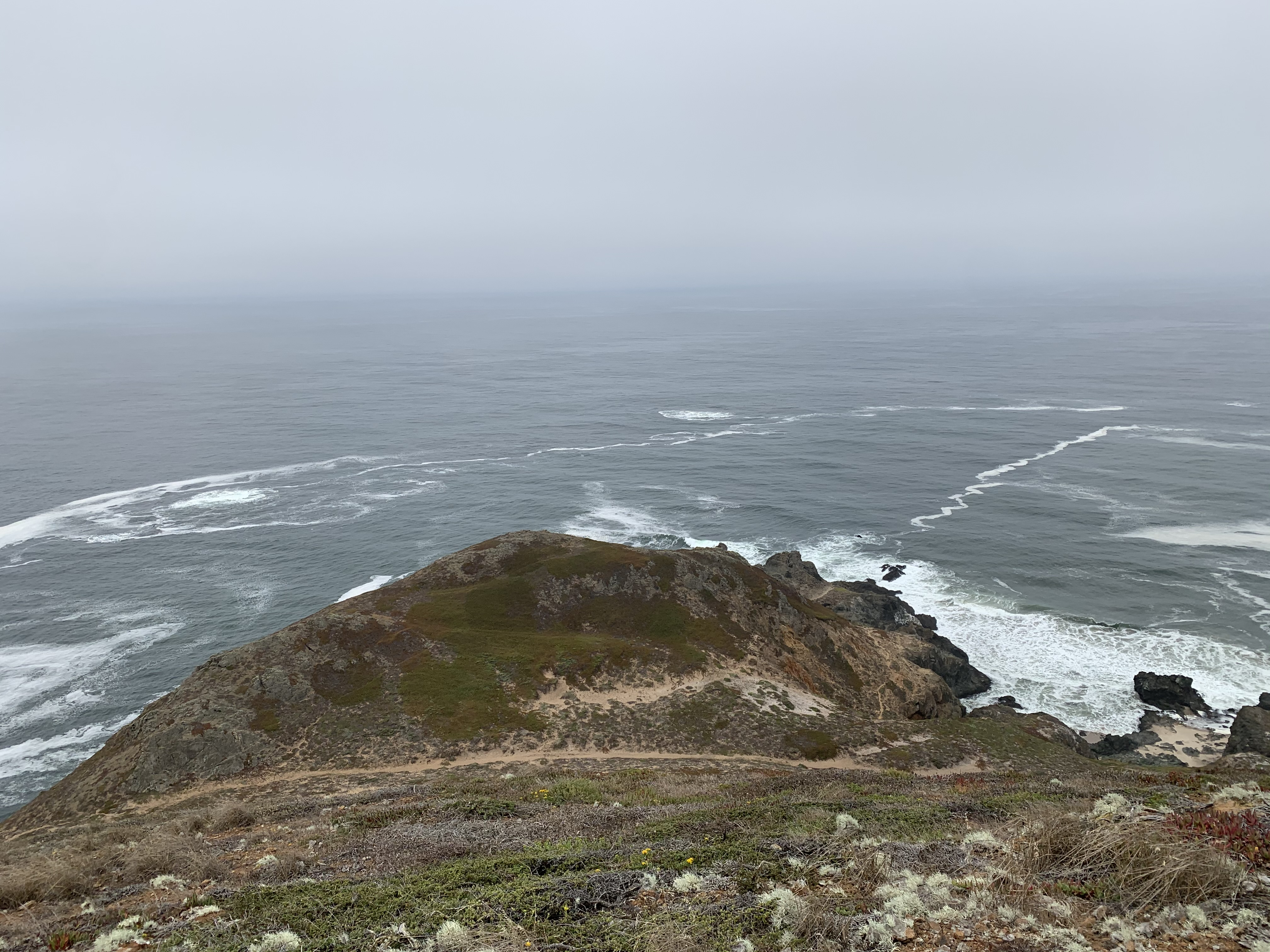
Point Sal as of August 2020.

During the winter of 1998, portions of the access road to the beach were washed out by winter rains. As of June 2011, the road has not been repaired and remains closed to vehicles. Point Sal State Beach is accessible only to visitors who hike to the beach. One way is to travel west on Brown Road from its junction with Highway 1 approximately 2 miles (3.2 km) south of downtown Guadalupe. With cars parked at the trailhead, there is a hike of approximately 4.5 miles (7.2 km) to the top of the cliff overlooking the beach. Visitors should allow sufficient time to return to the trailhead on Brown Road by sunset.

Alternatively, the strong hiker can trek 12 miles (19 km) (round trip) to the state beach from Rancho Guadalupe Dunes County Park located to the north of Point Sal. The entrance to the park is accessed by driving approximately 6 miles (9.7 km) west on Main Street from Highway 1 in Guadalupe. The park closes at 7:30 pm, well before local sundown in the summer.

The route involving going through Casmalia using Point Sal Road is no longer accessible to the general public since it requires traversing Vandenberg Space Force Base.

== See also ==
- List of beaches in California
- List of California state parks
