= 1080 AM =

AM radio frequency

The following radio stations broadcast on AM frequency 1080 kHz: 1080 AM is a United States clear-channel frequency. KRLD Dallas, WTIC Hartford and KOAN Anchorage share Class A status on 1080 AM.

Because 1080 kHz is a multiple of both 9 and 10, the frequency is available for use by broadcast stations in all three ITU regions.

== Argentina ==
- Claridad in Monte Grande, Buenos Aires
- LU3 Ondas del Sur in Bahia Blanca, Buenos Aires

== Brazil ==
- ZYH 485 in Itapetinga, Bahia
- ZYH 470 in Feira de Santana, Bahia
- ZYH 708 in Brasília, Distrito Federal
- ZYL 251 in Juiz de Fora, Minas Gerais
- ZYL 232 in Dores do Indaiá, Minas Gerais
- ZYI 784 in Caruaru, Pernambuco
- ZYK 260 in Porto Alegre, Rio Grande do Sul
- ZYK 254 in Iraí, Rio Grande do Sul
- ZYK 704 in Aparecida, São Paulo
- ZYK 669 in Sorocaba, São Paulo

== Indonesia ==
- RRI Pro-1 in Singaraja, Bali

== Laos ==
- Transfer CRI CGTN Radio (during 00:00-02:00)

== Mexico ==
- XETUL-AM in Tultitlan, Mexico (state)
- XEUU-AM in Colima, Colima

== Philippines ==
- DWIN in Dagupan City
- DWRL in Legaspi City
- DXKS in Surigao City

== Spain ==
- Cadena SER (Radio Coruña) in A Coruña
- Cadena SER (Radio Granada) in Granada
- Cadena SER (Radio Huesca) in Huesca
- Cadena SER (Radio Mallorca) in Palma de Mallorca
- Onda Cero Radio Toledo in Toledo

== United States ==
Stations in bold are clear-channel stations.

Call sign	City of license	Facility ID	Class	Daytime power (kW)	Nighttime power (kW)	Critical hours power (kW)	Unlimited power (kW)	Transmitter coordinates
KEMR	Milan, New Mexico	22391	D	2.5		2		35.151389°N 107.876111°W
KGVY	Green Valley, Arizona	14662	D	1				31.929167°N 110.996389°W
KNDK	Langdon, North Dakota	35211	D	1	0.045			48.785833°N 98.366111°W
KOAK	Red Oak, Iowa	26457	D	0.25				41.0175°N 95.205°W
**KOAN**	Anchorage, Alaska	12961	A				10	61.12°N 149.895278°W
**KRLD**	Dallas, Texas	59820	A	50	50			32.890278°N 96.645556°W
KRSK	Portland, Oregon	57830	B	50	9			45.558333°N 122.4825°W
KSCO	Santa Cruz, California	41594	B	10	5			36.961944°N 121.980833°W
KSLL	Price, Utah	41579	D	10		5		39.561944°N 110.776667°W
KVNI	Coeur d'Alene, Idaho	49245	B	10	1			47.616389°N 116.719722°W
KYMN	Northfield, Minnesota	36013	D	1	0.011			44.486667°N 93.105278°W
KYMO	East Prairie, Missouri	69567	D	0.5				36.796944°N 89.355278°W
WALD	Johnsonville, South Carolina	27463	D	9		2.7		33.91°N 79.669167°W
WFTD	Marietta, Georgia	52862	D	50		30		34.023333°N 84.668056°W
WHOO	Winter Park, Florida	54573	D	6	0.055			28.466667°N 81.374722°W
WKAC	Athens, Alabama	37505	D	5		2.5		34.836944°N 86.974444°W
WKBY	Chatham, Virginia	72663	D	1				36.781667°N 79.391389°W
WKGX	Lenoir, North Carolina	22915	D	5		2.5		35.910556°N 81.559722°W
WKJK	Louisville, Kentucky	55497	B	10	1			38.308056°N 85.829167°W (daytime); 38.307778°N 85.829167°W (nighttime)
WLEY	Cayey, Puerto Rico	52945	B				0.25	18.115278°N 66.141111°W
WNWI	Oak Lawn, Illinois	49785	B	5	2.6			41.642778°N 87.645556°W
WOAP	Owosso, Michigan	41682	D	1				43.030833°N 84.178056°W
WOKT	Cannonsburg, Kentucky	73185	D	1.8				38.386111°N 82.698056°W
WQOS	Coral Gables, Florida	74165	B	50	10			25.748056°N 80.546389°W
WRYT	Edwardsville, Illinois	27556	D	0.5	0.02	0.38		38.799444°N 89.9°W
**WTIC**	Hartford, Connecticut	66464	A	50	50			41.7775°N 72.805278°W
WUFO	Amherst, New York	60154	D	1				42.946111°N 78.828611°W
WWDR	Murfreesboro, North Carolina	56666	D	0.93				36.44°N 77.136111°W
WWNL	Pittsburgh, Pennsylvania	18517	D	50		25		40.604722°N 79.960278°W

== Vietnam ==
- Transfer CRI CGTN Radio (during 00:00-02:00)
