= Special temporary authority =

U.S. type of broadcast license

Special Temporary Authority (STA) 74 CFR 73.1635 in U.S. broadcast law is a type of broadcast license which temporarily allows a broadcast station to operate outside of its normal technical or legal parameters. In the Federal Communications Commission (FCC) station database (CDBS), broadcast STA applications have a prefix of BSTA (general), BLSTA (legal), BESTA (engineering), or BLESTA (both). STAs can also be issued for other telecommunication services under FCC regulation. Often an STA is necessary due to an unforeseen event. A station operator must exhibit why the STA is necessary and serves the public good.

A common reason to apply for STA is an equipment failure. In case a station cannot use its licensed antenna or transmission system, it can immediately continue operations using any available antenna or operating parts of existing system, as long as an STA is filed for within 24 hours. An AM station may use a random wire antenna if necessary. AM stations operating directionally are limited to 25 percent of their licensed power if their directional array fails and they must operate non-directionally under STA. If a station is evicted from its transmitter site or must move for another reason, it may also continue operating from a temporary site under the same rules, as long as it does not change or increase its coverage area or plan to permanently broadcast from that site. These rules allow stations to resume broadcasting quickly in case of a state of disaster.

A station may go silent entirely for up to ten days without notifying the FCC at all, and up to thirty days with only a letter of notification. A station that is or will be silent for longer than thirty days must apply for a "silent STA", which can be granted for up to six months. The FCC typically required that silence be for reasons beyond the operator's control, such as total equipment failure or loss of programming, and asked for plans to return the station to air. The commission has since started to grant silent STAs for financial reasons. Stations that are silent can also apply for an operational STA to resume broadcasting from a temporary facility, to avoid losing its license after one continuous year of silence. The one-year limit was written into the Telecommunications Act of 1996 and cannot be overridden by the FCC due to extenuating circumstances.

This silent/operational STA process presents a loophole in that it can be used to work around the Telecommunications Act indefinitely, and such STAs are normally granted with little oversight. In January 2018, the FCC initiated a crackdown on stations that exploit the loophole. The first high-profile case was co-owned stations WBVA in Bayside, Virginia, and WVAB in Virginia Beach, Virginia, whose 2017 license renewals were designated for a hearing. The stations have operated under a cycle of silent and operational STAs since 2008; they applied yearly to broadcast with 30 and 6 watts, respectively, from a temporary site for several weeks before going silent for the rest of the year. Station owner Birach Broadcasting Corporation has claimed it is stuck with the temporary facilities as it has been unable to get zoning approval for a new transmitter site.

An STA can also be used for special events as a restricted service licence is in the United Kingdom, however this is rare. A market has developed around proprietary devices that provide live audio or video to attendees of a conference or sporting event; these devices receive a signal from a low-powered television station operating under a temporary STA in VHF Band I, which is largely no longer used for broadcasting.
