= Ron Cameron (sportscaster) =

American radio host from Detroit (1945–2024)

- Born: January 19, 1945; Detroit, Michigan, U.S.
- Died: February 20, 2024 (aged 79)
- Occupation: Radio host

Ronald Ray Cameron (January 19, 1945 – February 20, 2024) was an American radio host who helped popularize the sports talk radio format in the Detroit market. He worked in that business off and on for more than 50 years, while also pursuing secondary careers in television, print publishing, and ownership of radio stations, restaurants, and sports teams.

== Early life ==
Ronald Ray Cameron was born in Detroit, Michigan, on January 19, 1945. He grew up in the Parkside Housing project on the east side of Detroit. He dropped out of school in the ninth grade, and left home at 15 to escape a difficult family life. He then worked in a variety of jobs, including restaurant bus boy, hospital orderly, hotel elevator operator, and hotel night manager.

Cameron grew up with a strong love of sports, according to a 1979 column by Detroit Free Press columnist Joe Lapointe, who met Cameron in 1967 at Tiger Stadium.

"During Tiger games, 'Superfan' Ron would sneak over to the empty box seats in my section and argue with the paying customers about sports," wrote LaPointe. "After the games, he would beg a few words with the ballplayers or umpires. Or concession stand boys. Or anybody. He loved to talk about sports."

In the early 1970s, Cameron worked as a minor league umpire for two years. In 1974, he ran umpiring schools in Roseville, MI and Brighton, MI. In the late 1970s, he helped umpire annual charity exhibition games between the Detroit Tigers and the Cincinnati Reds.

== Radio ==
Cameron used his umpiring experience to start his radio career in 1971 when he worked with Norm Plummer of WWJ radio on a show titled "Ask the Umpire".

Later, Cameron hosted his own radio sports talk shows on WEXL (1975–1977) and WMZK-FM (1977–1978).

=== WXYZ ===
Cameron's big break in the radio business came in September 1978, when he was hired by talk radio station WXYZ to host a sports talk show. His hiring was part of that station's successful format switch from pop music to talk radio. That show soon grew in popularity, with Cameron interviewing many famous Detroit sports figures. In September 1980, George Blaha joined Cameron as co-host of Sportstalk. An occasional guest co-host was future ESPN star Dick Vitale, former coach of the University of Detroit and Detroit Pistons basketball teams. At WXYZ, Cameron was publicized as "Superfan" and appeared in advertisements in a Superman-type costume.

During Cameron's time at WXYZ, the sports talk format spread to other radio stations in the Detroit area, including WJR-AM, where Frank Beckmann hosted Sports Wrap starting in 1981. The increasing popularity of sports talk radio in the Detroit area later led to all-sports stations like WDFN and WXYT-FM. Before Cameron entered sports talk radio, one of the few such shows in the Detroit area was hosted from 1967 to 1970 on WXYZ-AM by WXYZ-TV sportscaster Dave Diles.

WXYZ cancelled Cameron's sports talk show in September 1981 because of poor ratings with women and listeners 35 and older.

=== After WXYZ ===
Cameron then embarked on an independent radio career using the time brokerage business model. Cameron purchases time on radio stations and sells that time to commercial sponsors. In between commercials, Cameron invites listeners to call in to the radio show with questions and comments.

This business model has led to contracts with many radio stations in the Detroit area, sometimes more than once. Cameron appeared on WQBH-AM for three weeks in 1982, and then started a long partnership with WCAR in January 1983. Cameron's later radio stations included WKSG-FM (late 1980s), WLLZ-AM (mid 1990s), WHND-AM (mid to late 1990s), CKLW (late 1990s), WPON-AM (late 1990s), WDFN (early 2010s) and WCXI (late 2010s).

=== Later shows ===
From the mid-2010s, Cameron hosted shows on mostly WDTK and WPON. During that time, his producers Alex Alway, Joey Lino and Matt Siroskey often joined the on-air discussions. His later shows attracted a regular group of callers whose unique personalities and interests essentially made these callers regular features of the show.

Cameron's radio guests in the mid-2010s and early 2020s included older sports figures who no longer receive much attention on sports talk shows that are aimed at younger audiences. Many of these sports figures were interviewed a few years before they died. These deceased interviewees included Bob Wolff, Tommy Lasorda, Jud Heathcote, Bob Miller, and Jim Bunning. Other still-living interviewees have included Phil Regan, Charlie Maxwell, Jake Wood, and Boots Day. Cameron's show also included regular appearances by Detroit area sports and media personalities like Ray Scott, Denny McLain, Jerry Green, Jim Devellano, Ken Holland, Paul Woods, Terry Foster, Rich Kincaide, and Mark Wilson.

Cameron's later shows developed a cult-like following in one of the most active discussion threads on the Michigan Radio and TV Buzzboard. Thread participants have expressed themselves through critical analysis, fact checking, satirical fiction, and song parodies.

Cameron's contract with WDTK was terminated May 1, 2023 after the alleged usage of racial slurs the previous day's show. He returned to WPON and hosted a show until February 16, 2024.

=== Radio Station Ownership and Management ===
Cameron also tried owning and managing radio stations. In June 1992, he bought a 1,000-watt radio station in Bradenton, FL (WJRB-AM), which was on the air for only five months before it went off the air and was put on the market for a new buyer. He returned to Michigan in 1994 to buy a 3,000-watt radio station in Standish. In 1997, he signed a three-year lease on radio station KMET in Banning, CA, but was back in Michigan in 1998. In March 1999, he started work as general manager of KSBQ in Santa Maria, CA, but left the station about six months later to buy a minor league baseball team in Lafayette, Louisiana.

== Television ==
In 1977, Cameron began hosting the Sportstalk television show on WXON, and also sold commercials for the show.

In April 1984, he started the Sports View Today show on cable television, and expanded it to regular broadcast television on WGPR in August 1984. This show usually featured Cameron and a co-host interviewing a famous sports figure. For many years, Cameron's Sports View Today co-host was Detroit sports media personality Bob Page, and the show became well known for the good-natured insults between the two men. In 1984, when Cameron and Page were working together, Sports View Today won a cable television ACE (Awards for Cable Excellence) award. Page moved to a job in New York in 1989, and was succeeded by WJZZ-FM sportscaster Mark Unger in 1989, former Detroit Tigers pitcher Denny McLain in 1989, and Michigan State sports broadcaster Russ Small in 1991. Sports View Today ended in 1992 when Cameron moved to Bradenton, FL to buy a radio station.

In 1996 and 1997, Cameron hosted a television show on WXON with Detroit News reporter Jim Spadafore. In 2012, Cameron re-united with Denny McLain on television on Speaking Sports on WADL.

== Magazine ==
In August 1986, Cameron started a tabloid-style sports magazine titled Sports Fans Journal, which included short columns by different well-known sports figures. Cameron would often publicize this publication on his radio and television shows by saying, "Sports Fans Journal—still going strong!" The magazine lasted until 1990. Former AP Michigan sports editor Larry Paladino was the editor of Sports Fans Journal.

== Restaurants ==
From 1981, Cameron tried different kinds of cuisine in restaurants that he usually owned for only a short period of time. In 1993, Detroit Free Press TV/radio reporter Steve Crowe wrote that Cameron "changed eatery locations more often than some change socks." Cameron has often hosted his radio show in these restaurants.

His restaurants in the metropolitan Detroit area have included an Italian restaurant in Birmingham; sports bars on both the east and west sides of Detroit; a submarine sandwich shop in downtown Detroit; a Coney Island hot dog restaurant in Dearborn Heights; a broasted chicken restaurant in Romulus; an old-fashioned grill and pizza in Southfield ("All Star Grill and Pizza"); a pizza establishment in Livonia; and a general restaurant ("Home Run Eatery") in West Bloomfield.

== Sports Team Ownership ==
In 1999, Cameron attempted to buy the Lafayette (Louisiana) Bull Frogs minor league baseball team. That deal fell through when Cameron and his business partners were unable to make a payment.

== Personality ==
Cameron's strong personality both on and off the air has been the subject of much commentary. A Detroit Free Press advertisement in 1975 for a personal appearance at an appliance store described him as "Controversial Sports Caster Ron Cameron." In 1979, he was kicked out of the press box at a Detroit Red Wings hockey game after criticizing the Red Wings organist for playing the song "Three Blind Mice" as an apparent comment on the officiating of the game.

=== Media commentary ===
In a newspaper column in the May 7, 1979 edition of the Detroit Free Press, Joe LaPointe wrote about the mixed feelings that Cameron had generated among sports fans, media, and athletes in the Detroit area. "In his sometimes bellicose discussions with fans and athletes, Cameron's sincerity and his affection for Detroit sports comes through," wrote LaPointe.

A few months later, another Detroit Free Press sports columnist was not as diplomatic as LaPointe. "It is, I suggest, a sad commentary of the current state of affairs in our city that the only sports talk show in town is the Ron Cameron Comedy Hour on WXYZ radio," wrote Jim Hawkins on November 20, 1979. "The show, like its master of ceremonies, is a joke. Which would be fine except for the fact that the program isn't supposed to be funny."

In a feature article in 1990, Detroit Free Press Staff Writer Neal Rubin wrote, "The city's most opinionated sportscaster remains loud, irreverent, bombastic and either entertaining or obnoxious, depending on whether he is speaking to you or about you."

In 1992, when Cameron moved from Michigan to Florida to buy a radio station, Detroit Free Press TV/Radio Reporter Steve Crowe wrote, "At his worst, Cameron...came across as a rude, arrogant, obnoxious, and self-promoting name-dropper. Despite too much spit and not enough polish, the best Cameron offered was sometimes good. He practiced hit-and-miss journalism much of the way, but developed dandy local sources."

In that same article, Cameron made some parting comments before leaving town. "I've stepped on a lot of toes, no question. That's the way I am, and that's not the way TV and radio stations are run in this town. But a lot of these stations are in bed with these teams and jock sniffers, and I'm just not like that."

=== Reactions to On-Air Predictions ===
Cameron's on-air predictions have generated both praise and criticism.

In 1989, Cameron correctly reported that former University of Michigan football coach Bo Schembechler would become the next president of the Detroit Tigers baseball team.

In 1990, Cameron reported that the Detroit Tigers would move its playing location from Detroit to suburban Dearborn. According to Cameron, "the new stadium would be privately funded by Tigers owner Tom Monaghan, with most of the money coming from the impending sale of Monaghan's Domino's Pizza chain." Schembechler responded to Cameron's report by saying, "I have not yet discussed anything about the stadium. As far as I know that report is pure speculation." Six months after Cameron's report, Dearborn Councilman Doug Thomas quoted an unnamed source from an investment company working with Domino's Pizza that the Dearborn stadium "will be completed in late 1993 or early 1994, in an area bounded by Ford, Greenfield, Southfield, and Paul roads." In 1997, ground was broken in downtown Detroit for a new stadium for the Tigers. The Tigers moved into this stadium (Comerica Park) in 2000.

== Personal life ==
Cameron never married. On his radio show, he talked much about his lifestyle, which included living in hotels and eating in restaurants that advertise on his radio show. He discussed the challenges of this lifestyle, including motel maids throwing out valuable pieces of written information like telephone numbers and hotel television packages not including sports stations.

In 1990, Eli Zaret, sports director of WJBK-TV, said about Cameron, "He has no discernible life that anyone can determine outside of sports. I don't know if he has ever read a book about anything else, been to a movie about anything else or had a friend involved in anything else." Cameron's hobbies include watching the Match Game and The Golden Girls television shows.

Cameron died on February 20, 2024, at the age of 79.
