= WEW =

Radio station in St. Louis

- St. Louis, Missouri; United States
- Broadcast area: Greater St. Louis
- Frequency: 770 kHz
- Branding: WEW 770 AM

Programming
- Format: Brokered programming

Ownership
- Owner: Birach Broadcasting
- Sister stations: WIJR

History
- First air date: March 23, 1922; 104 years ago (broadcast license)
- Former frequencies: 619 kHz (1922); 833 kHz (1922–1923); 1150 kHz (1923–1924); 1070 kHz (1924–1925); 1210 kHz (1925–1926); 833 kHz (1926–1927); 830 kHz (1927); 850 kHz (1927–1928); 760 kHz (1928–1941)
- Call sign meaning: Randomly assigned, later backronymed to the slogan "We Enlighten the World"

Technical information
- Licensing authority: FCC
- Facility ID: 1088
- Class: D
- Power: 1,000 watts (daytime only)
- Transmitter coordinates: 38°37′18.2″N 90°4′34.4″W (NAD83)

Links
- Public license information: Public file; LMS
- Webcast: Listen live
- Website: wewradio.com

WEW (770 AM) is a commercial radio station in St. Louis, Missouri. Owned by Birach Broadcasting Corporation, its studios are on Hampton Avenue in St. Louis. First licensed in March 1922, WEW is one of the oldest radio stations in the United States.

The station's transmitter site is on Bunkam Road in Jerseyville, Illinois, near Interstate 64. WEW is licensed to broadcast during daytime hours only, with 1,000 watts using a non-directional antenna. At night, it must protect clear-channel station WABC in New York City, the dominant Class A station on 770 AM, from interference, so WEW stays off the air until sunrise.

The station features a brokered programming radio format. WEW's daily schedule consists entirely of programming provided by Overcomer Ministry featuring sermons from Brother Stair.

== History ==
=== University experiments ===
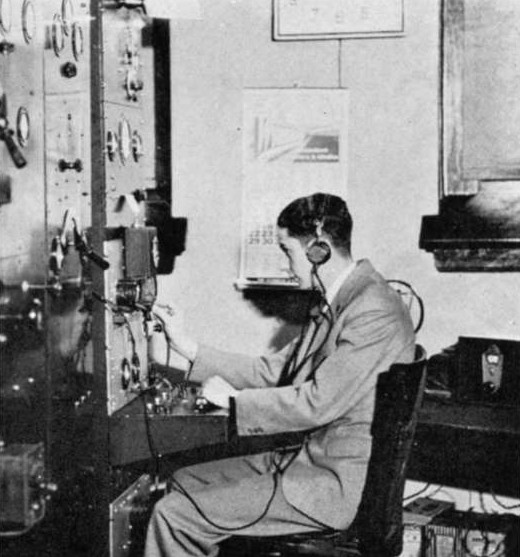
Gordon Sherman, chief engineer of WEW at the controls, 1933.

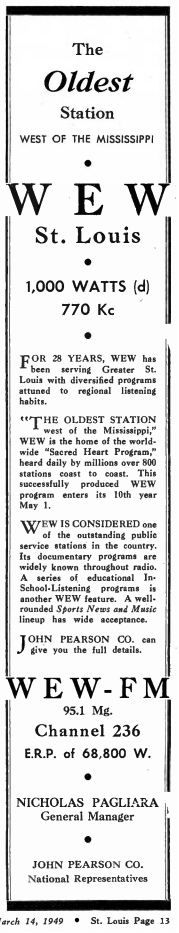
1949 advertisement included the claim to be the oldest station west of the Mississippi River

WEW was first licensed as a broadcasting station to St. Louis University (SLU) on March 23, 1922. However, previous radio experimentation at SLU dated back to 1912. In February 1915, SLU was issued a license to operate a "Technical and Training School" station with the call sign 9YR.

In May 1916, this station's license was changed to an "Experimental" authorization, with a new call sign of 9XY. These early operations transmitted seismological and weather information by Morse code. With the entrance of the United States into World War I in April 1917, all civilian stations were ordered to cease operations, and the university's radio station was shut down for the duration of the conflict. During the war, SLU trained over 300 radio operators for the United States Army.

=== 9YK ===
With the end of the war, civilian radio operations were re-established. In August 1920, the university was again issued a "Technical and Training School" license, now with the call sign of 9YK. George E. Rueppel, S.J. was a Catholic lay brother in the Jesuit religious order. He was assistant director of the Meteorological Observatory at SLU and had the primary responsibility for the university's experimental station. He resumed his duties with the establishment of 9YK.

During the war, advances in vacuum tube design made audio transmissions practical, and 9YK was upgraded to take advantage of this new technology. In late March 1921, the United States Weather Bureau, in conjunction with the SLU Department of Science, received permission from federal authorities to air informational broadcasts. Twice each day, 9YK broadcast the official weather reports for Missouri and Illinois, in addition to giving the local river stages. This new service made its debut over 9YK at 10:05 a.m. on April 26, 1921. SLU president Reverend William Robison, S.J., made an introductory statement, then read a 500-word Weather Bureau bulletin. 9YK was the second radio station authorized by the Weather Bureau to make audio weather forecast broadcasts, and the first to include river reports. On August 22 livestock, grain and provision market reports were added to the broadcast schedule at 2 p.m. daily at 350 meters (857 kHz). Weather reports aired at 10 am.

=== WEW ===
Initially there were no specific standards for stations making broadcasts intended for the general public. Effective December 1, 1921, the Department of Commerce, which regulated radio at this time, adopted new guidelines that included a classification of "broadcasting stations". Two transmitting wavelengths were set aside for this service: 360 meters (833 kilohertz) for "entertainment" and 485 meters (619 kilohertz) for "market and weather reports". Stations providing programs intended for the general public were now required to obtain a "Limited Commercial License" that included a broadcast service assignment. SLU was issued its first broadcasting station authorization, for 485 meters, on March 23, 1922, with the randomly assigned call letters WEW. WEW was the second Saint Louis station to receive a broadcasting authorization, following the Post-Dispatch's KSD (now KTRS), which had been licensed earlier that month. However, WEW includes the prior 9YK operations as part of its broadcasting history, so it has traditionally celebrated April 26, 1921, as its founding date.

On May 31, 1922, the station was authorized to also broadcast on the 360-meter (833 kHz) entertainment wavelength. Over the next few years WEW was shifted to a number of other transmitting frequencies. On November 11, 1928, it settled on 760 kHz as part of a nationwide reallocation, under the Federal Radio Commission's implementation of General Order 40, now limited to daytime-only operation. On March 29, 1941, all stations on 760 kHz were moved to 770 kHz, WEW's current dial position, under the provisions of the North American Regional Broadcasting Agreement (NARBA).

=== University programs ===
WEW introduced a number of innovative programs, featuring talks by the faculty. Other programs included "Parents' Forum", the "Science Series", "Farm School", the "Amateur Radio Forum" and the "Editorial Page of the Air". It has also been suggested that the "Question Box Hour", a feature from 1923 described as "the first Catholic inquiry forum of the air", may qualify as the first radio quiz show.

Unlike most early radio stations licensed to educational institutions, WEW continued to be operated by the university, despite the financial difficulties caused by the Great Depression. In 1928, the station was on the air for an average of only eight hours per week, but by 1937 its weekly broadcast schedule had expanded to 57 hours of "service, education, and entertainment" programming.

Studios were housed on the top floor of SLU's Law School (currently O'Neil Hall). The transmitter tower, which would be torn down in 1954, was located roughly where Pius XII Memorial Library now stands. Brother George E. Rueppel continued active participation with the station until his death in 1947, serving at times as "engineer... station manager, program director, continuity writer, platter turner, announcer, talent scout, auditioner and star performer".

The university was the first in the St. Louis area to receive a permit for an FM station. It was initially authorized in 1941 with the call sign K51L, transmitting on 45.1 MHz. The call letters were later changed to WEW-FM. It began broadcasting on May 17, 1947, using a 542-foot (165-meter) tall transmission tower constructed on the university's campus. Because the AM station's license limited it to daytime hours, the FM signal provided the opportunity for nighttime programs. However, in December 1949, SLU president the Reverend Paul C. Reinert, S.J. announced that WEW-FM would be shut down. He said it was "because FM broadcasting has not been accepted by the general public".

=== Changes in ownership ===
A few years later the university exited broadcasting altogether, with the exception of a student-run carrier current station, KBIL. The university sold WEW to a company headed by Aubrey D. Reid, a news director at KXOK (630 AM). Reid went by the professional name of Bruce Barrington. Following the sale of the station, in June 1955, WEW's format was changed from non-commercial educational programs with classical music to a commercial operation broadcasting country and western music.

WEW was sold again five years later. In 1964, the station was purchased by Charles Stanley, who moved the studios to various locations, including the original Busch Stadium upon completion of the venue. WEW was the only radio station located in a major sports stadium. (Stanley was known for trading merchandise in exchange for commercial time.) Other studio locations included "The Hill", Soulard, and Clayton. WEW was later owned by the Broadcast Center, then by Texas businessman Gary Acker. Acker's Metropolitan Radio Group transferred the station to the Birach Broadcasting Corporation on January 6, 2004. Birach Broadcasting is based in Southfield, Michigan, outside Detroit.

Birach Broadcasting Corporation's sole proprietor Sima Birach died October 14, 2025.

=== Nighttime authorization ===
Through nearly its entire history, WEW has been a daytimer station, required to go off the air at night. That is rare for one of the earliest radio stations in the U.S. Management has been trying to give WEW nighttime authorization and more than just 1,000 watts of power in the daytime.

On April 28, 2016, WEW was granted a Federal Communications Commission (FCC) construction permit to move to a new transmitter site. That would be coupled with an increase in daytime power to 10,000 watts and the addition of nighttime operation with 200 watts. Birach Broadcasting has not yet built the new facilities.

== Historical status ==
Station publicity has commonly claimed that WEW is "the second oldest radio station in the United States". It credits KDKA in Pittsburgh as the first commercial station, which began regular broadcasts as 8ZZ on November 2, 1920. This in turn is said to make WEW the "oldest broadcast station west of the Mississippi River". This assertion uses April 26, 1921, the date that 9YK made its first audio weather report broadcast, as the starting date for combined 9YK/WEW operations.

However, numerous other stations, on both sides of the Mississippi River, have earlier establishment dates than WEW and even KDKA, when combined with their predecessor operations. They include WWJ in Detroit, which began regular broadcasts as 8MK in August 1920, WOC in Davenport, Iowa, which traces its origin to station 9BY, which began regular broadcasts around September 1920, KLZ in Denver which had regular programs as 9ZAF beginning in October 1920, and WHA in Madison, Wisconsin, which began transmitting weather forecasts in January 1921.

== See also ==
- List of initial AM-band station grants in the United States
- List of three-letter broadcast call signs in the United States
