= WOAP =

Radio station in Owosso, Michigan

- Owosso, Michigan; United States
- Broadcast area: Shiawassee County
- Frequency: 1080 kHz C-QUAM AM Stereo
- Branding: "La Poderosa Con Sentiento Mexicano"

Programming
- Format: Regional Mexican
- Affiliations: WMJH-AM

Ownership
- Owner: Cynthia Citlalick Cano; (Cano's Broadcasting, LLC)

History
- First air date: January 1, 1948
- Call sign meaning: W Owosso Argus Press (original owner)

Technical information
- Licensing authority: FCC
- Facility ID: 41682
- Class: D
- Power: AM: 1,000 watts day
- Transmitter coordinates: 43°01′51″N 84°10′41″W
- Translator: 103.1 W276CZ (Saginaw)

Links
- Public license information: Public file; LMS
- Webcast: WOAP Webstream
- Website: WOAP Online

WOAP (1080 AM) is a commercial radio station broadcasting Regional Mexican Syndication of WMJH. Licensed to Owosso, Michigan, it serves Shiawassee County. While the station is a daytimer, licensed to operate during daylight hours only, its programming is heard around the clock on its FM translator W276CZ (103.1 MHz)

== FM Translator ==
WOAP operates a 250-watt FM translator which simulcasts WOAP, and broadcasts 24 hours a day to the immediate Owosso and Corunna areas. Although licensed to Saginaw, the translator's signal does not reach that city.

Broadcast translator for WOAP
| Call sign | Frequency | City of license | FID | ERP (W) | Class | FCC info |
|---|---|---|---|---|---|---|
| W276CZ | 103.1 FM | Saginaw, Michigan | 140015 | 250 | D | LMS |

== History ==
WOAP signed on the air on January 1, 1948. It was founded as an AM/FM combo station by the local daily newspaper. The call letters stand for Owosso Argus-Press. The AM station was, and still is, a daytime-only station, while the FM station was intended to provide full-time service to the Owosso area. But at that time, there were few FM radios so WOAP-FM went silent by 1953. A decade later, there were enough FM radios on the air to allow WOAP-FM to return to the air on December 2, 1965.

Because the Argus-Press had a media monopoly in the Owosso area at that time with its daily newspaper and two radio stations, the Federal Communications Commission (FCC) forced the Argus-Press to sell the radio stations in 1987.

The FM station is known today as 103.9 WRSR. In the late 1990s, the Michigan Radio Group sold both stations. Connoisseur Communications then assumed ownership of both, turning WMZX into a more regional station serving the Flint area while still licensed to Owosso. WOAP adopted an adult standards music format in 1995 after WFDF 910 AM dropped the format in favor of talk. The weaker WOAP, with its daytime-only signal, was then sold the following year to Hartman Broadcasting, which continued to operate WOAP as a local service, still retaining the standards format and imaging it as Great American Classics.

Less than two years later, Hartman Broadcasting sold WOAP to 1090 Investments, which immediately applied to the FCC for a construction permit to move the station's operations to Waverly, located in Lansing's suburbs. The move would have allowed WOAP to increase its daytime power to 50,000 watts and add nighttime power authorization of 4,500 watts. Three years after the application was received, the FCC chose to dismiss the application, presumably under the likelihood that granting the station nighttime power would cause interference to WTIC in Hartford, Connecticut and KRLD in Dallas, the Class A clear channel stations on AM 1080.

In January 2006, WOAP dropped its full service news/talk format and adopted Catholic Religious programming. Three months later, 1090 Investments requested a Special Temporary Authority (STA) to take the station dark, citing financial difficulties. The station remained off the air for almost a year. Four months after going dark, the station applied for reinstatement to move its facilities to Waverly and increase its daytime power, but withdrew its application for nighttime power. However, 1090 Investments pleaded for the FCC in its engineering presentation to be considered for nighttime power again, citing that denying Waverly local radio service in favor of a Connecticut station that had no local presence in Michigan would hurt its attempts to serve its community in an adequate fashion.

In March 2007, WOAP was granted permission to move from Owosso to Waverly and increase its power with a six-tower directional antenna system to be built in Ingham County, about 20 miles south of Lansing. The station also returned to the air with a simulcast of the sports radio programming on sister station 1090 WCAR in Livonia, Michigan. Despite the good news, WOAP again applied for a silent STA, going dark again on July 20, 2007.

WOAP applied for an extension to stay off the air on January 8, 2008, citing ongoing financial difficulties. The request was granted on February 25, 2008. The STA extension expired on July 21, 2008. The station returned to the air in mid-July 2008 simulcasting co-owned WCAR, but fell silent once again on August 18, 2008.

On July 21, 2008 (the day that WOAP's STA extension was set to expire), local webcaster Mint City Radio launched WOAP Online, an internet-only radio station patterned after the old WOAP's full service format. WOAP Online was programmed as a local radio station, featured music from the 1970s-90s, agricultural features, local announcements and old-time radio shows. WOAP Online has also featured coverage of local events, such as the Clinton County 4-H Youth Fair and Saint Johns Mint Festival (including coverage of the annual Mint Festival Parade).

In September 2008, the station again applied for permission to remain silent due to "ongoing financial problems." As a matter of general FCC policy, financial causes are not sufficient reason to remain silent and still retain the license - the reason must be something "beyond the control" of the licensee.

In May 2009, 1090 Investments sold its radio stations, including WOAP, to Birach Broadcasting Corporation. At that point, Mint City Radio dropped the WOAP moniker for its webcasts effective June 1.

When the new management entered the studios for the first time on July 18, they found that practically nothing worked and the roof leaked. They had to rebuild the station and had a deadline from the FCC of August 18 to get the station back on the air or lose the operating license.

The station returned to the air branded as The Big 1080 on August 14, 2009, with an oldies format from its Owosso studio location. As the station returned to the air, the master control studio was being rebuilt and the neon WOAP sign, which had not worked for several years, was being repaired. WOAP announced on the air that Birach Broadcasting had ended its plans to move the station to the Lansing area.

"The Big 1080" returned the traditional oldies format to a large chunk of mid-Michigan that had been without the format for some time, as the Lansing market no longer has an oldies station. WOAP was also the only station serving the Flint market with a 1950s-1970s nostalgia-based format, as WFNT, which had been airing Citadel Media's Timeless Favorites format, changed to a News/Talk format in February 2010.

WOAP carried Spartan Nation Radio which covers Michigan State University athletics weeknights from 6 to 9. The station began 24-hour streaming audio on the World Wide Web in September 2010. Weekend programming included two syndicated programs, Dick Clark's Rock, Roll & Remember and Dick Bartley's Classic Countdown. Also included in the weekend lineup was a Sunday morning church service and a local Polka program. Spanish language and music programming was later added to weekend afternoons.

As of February 2012, WOAP began broadcasting in C-Quam AM Stereo.

On April 10, 2012, Birach sold WOAP and WMJH AM 810 in Grand Rapids to Cano's Broadcasting Company, pending FCC approval. Total combined sale for both stations was $1.1-million in the form of a promissory note. However, as of October 2015, no record had yet been filed with the FCC that the sale had been consummated, and the station's license was renewed to Birach on April 9, 2015. WOAP continued to carry Oldies with the evening sports talk show "Spartan Nation Radio" hosted by Hondo Carpenter.

After three weeks of stunting with music of the 1950s, 1960s and 1970s, WOAP re-launched as "Super Hits 10-8-O" at the beginning of March 2013. The oldies format at that time evolved into more of a classic hits/oldies hybrid, with more 1980s music added into rotation.

On July 1, 2013, the station changed to a Spanish language format full time. After this flip, much of the format and presentation was moved onto WMJH, effectively resulting in a format swap between the two stations.

On February 2, 2015, the Spanish format was dropped and replaced with an adult hits format, this time an emphasis on 1980s and 1990s rock and pop music.

On September 4, 2015, WOAP added an FM translator station, 'W276CZ. It simulcasts WOAP and operates 24 hours a day. The FM signal serves the immediate Owosso/Corunna area.

On September 2, 2015, Birach Broadcasting again sold WOAP and sister station WMJH to Cano's Broadcasting, LLC. The sale, at a price of $1.1 million, was consummated on January 1, 2016.

On September 1, 2021, WOAP changed formats from adult hits to a hybrid rock/alternative/CHR format, branded as "103.1 Portal FM". After only four months, the "Portal" programming ended and the station returned to Regional Mexican as a simulcast of sister station WMJH.
