= WMFN =

- Peotone, Illinois; United States
- Broadcast area: Chicago metropolitan area; Northwest Indiana
- Frequency: 640 kHz
- Branding: Chicago's Gospel Network

Programming
- Format: Oldies

Ownership
- Owner: Birach Broadcasting Corporation
- Sister stations: WNWI

History
- First air date: 1990
- Former call signs: WBMX (1988–1991); WROR (1991–1993); WISZ (1993–1995)
- Call sign meaning: West Michigan's Fan (former region served and sports radio format)

Technical information
- Licensing authority: FCC
- Facility ID: 55089
- Class: B
- Power: 4,400 watts day; 1,600 watts night
- Transmitter coordinates: 41°18′4.1″N 87°50′7.2″W

Links
- Public license information: Public file; LMS
- Webcast: Listen live
- Website: www.birach.com/wcar

WMFN (640 AM) is a radio station broadcasting a gospel music format. The station is owned by Birach Broadcasting Corporation.

Licensed to Peotone, Illinois, the station targets Chicago, specifically the city's South and West Sides, where most of the city's Black population resides. The station's transmitter site is northwest of the intersection of Interstate 57 and (Will/Kankakee) County Line Road south of Peotone.

Though the station in technicality serves the radio market of Will County seat Joliet, along with Morris and Crete, the station's coverage area de facto serves Chicago and its suburbs.

== Technical details ==
The station is a "move in" frequency which originally served West Michigan, and first began broadcasting in Zeeland, Michigan, in 1990 under the WBMX call sign, serving Muskegon and Grand Rapids. The station has since been through a number of different formats and call signs, and changed market areas, which is rare for a station.

AM 640 is a United States clear-channel frequency, on which KFI in Los Angeles and KYUK in Bethel, Alaska, are the dominant Class A stations.

== History ==
AM 640 was originally a MOR station in 1990 when it signed on as WBMX, using the call sign that had recently been vacated by a popular urban contemporary station in Chicago. The following year, the owners of WROR-FM 98.5 in Boston, Massachusetts, bought the WBMX call letters from 640 in order to debut "Mix 98.5" there; in return, AM 640 received the WROR calls. Its format did not change. In 1993, WROR (AM) was sold and converted to Radio AAHS as WISZ, freeing the WROR calls to be used again in Boston, where they were again placed beginning in 1996.

For a time, the station also played adult standards (Westwood One's AM Only) at night as a continuation of daytimer sister station WMJH 810 AM's format. Since WMJH was known at the time as "Majic 810", WMFN's nighttime standards programming was called "Night Majic".

In 1995, AM 640 became WMFN, taking a sports radio format branded "West Michigan's Fan". During its sports talk days former NFL linebacker Ray Bentley hosted an afternoon program. In 1999, WMFN adopted a business news format branded "West Michigan's Financial News". Starting in 2000, WMFN evolved into a news/talk/sports format eventually becoming "Hot Talk 640". In 2005, WMFN's talk format was dropped in favor of an urban adult contemporary format branded "Smooth Vibes AM 640".

From about 2006 until November 2008, the station was leased to Tyrone Bynum, a controversial talk show host and deejay who hosted many of his programs on this station, which went under the name "Smooth Vibes"; during periods when there was no talk programming, Bynum (or his staffers) would play urban adult contemporary music.

In November 2008, due to low advertising revenues, Bynum opted not to renew his lease with Birach; on November 7, 2008, the station began carrying Regional Mexican programming, moved from WMJH. Bynum soon relaunched "Smooth Vibes" as an online-only station free from music licensing fees.

As "La Poderosa", the station became the exclusive Regional Mexican station in West Michigan, as former competitor stations WYGR and WNWZ have switched to other formats. The "Poderosa" format has since moved back to WMJH, which has also launched an FM translator at 93.3. At that time, WMFN became Radio Activa.

In 2014, the Federal Communications Commission allowed the station to be moved to south of Chicago in Peotone. The station aired a Spanish contemporary format. In summer of 2018, the station aired a Polish language format, Polski FM, simulcasting 92.7 WCPY.

On July 14, 2022, at 1 p.m., WMFN changed its format from Regional Mexican to African-American-oriented news from the Black Information Network (BIN). The station also began to be carried on the second HD Radio channel of WVAZ, which was already airing BIN. In September 2026, iHeartMedia ended its lease of WMFN, with BIN returning to airing only on WVAZ-HD2; after several days silent, the station began to air the demonstration music loop for Barix devices. Days after, it started simulcasting WCAR.

On November 1st, 2026, the station returned to the air again airing Chicago's Gospel Network, an in-house gospel music format.
