= WYHY =

WYHY may refer to:

- WOKT, a radio station (1080 AM) licensed to serve Cannonsburg, Kentucky, United States, which held the call sign WYHY from 2009 to 2015
- WRTB, a radio station (95.3 FM) licensed to serve Winnebago, Illinois, United States, which held the call sign WYHY from 2000 to 2006
- WRVW, a radio station (107.5 FM) licensed to serve Lebanon, Tennessee, United States, which held the call sign WYHY from 1982 to 1996
