= KSMA =

KSMA may refer to:

- KSMA (AM), a radio station (1240 AM) licensed to serve Santa Maria, California, United States
- KSMA-FM, a radio station (98.7 FM) licensed to serve Osage, Iowa, United States
- KTNK, a radio station (1410 AM) licensed to serve Lompoc, California, which held the call sign KSMA from 2009 to 2014
