= WVHF (AM) =

Coordinates: 42°56′09″N 85°27′26″W

- Kentwood, Michigan; United States
- Broadcast area: Grand Rapids, Michigan
- Frequency: 1140 kHz
- Branding: WVHF 1140 AM

Programming
- Format: Catholic, talk

Ownership
- Owner: Holy Family Radio

History
- First air date: September 18, 1978
- Former call signs: WJNZ (2003—2010); WKWM (1999–2003); WXBV (October 1998–June 1999); WKWM (1978–1998)
- Call sign meaning: 1140 Voice of Holy Family Radio

Technical information
- Licensing authority: FCC
- Class: D
- Power: 5,000 watts day only

Links
- Public license information: Public file; LMS
- Website: http://www.holyfamilyradio.net/

WVHF is an AM radio station licensed to broadcast at 1140 kHz for Kentwood, Michigan in the Grand Rapids market. The station is licensed to broadcast with 5,000 watts of power during the daytime hours but must sign off at sunset to protect co-channel WRVA (AM) in Richmond, Virginia. It is rebroadcast on WSPB 89.7 FM; licensed to Bedford, it serves the Battle Creek area.

In September 2009 WJNZ Radio was purchased at a public auction by Holy Family Radio with the intent of becoming a Catholic radio station with a talk format. The station was silent for several months pending the FCC's authorization to transfer the license and during which time the call signs were changed to WVHF - Voice of the Holy Family. The sale was completed on December 8, 2010, and the station went back on the air Christmas Day, 2010 with the new Catholic format. WVHF is a non-profit, listener-supported radio station.

== History ==
AM 1140 had a long history of serving the African-American community of Grand Rapids, originally as WKWM (the calls stood for the city of license, Kentwood, Michigan). WKWM began as a disco-formatted station in the late 1970s and migrated to Urban Contemporary in the early 1980s. In the 1980s, WKWM was a reporter to Billboard magazine's Hot Black/Soul/R&B airplay panel.

In the fall of 1998, WKWM tried a syndicated talk format as WXBV. Since Grand Rapids already had several talk-oriented stations, WXBV's talk format was unsuccessful and the station tumbled out of the ratings. Less than a year later, the heritage WKWM calls were restored and the station returned to music, airing Westwood One's satellite-fed "Groovin' Oldies" package.

By the end of 2001, Westwood One had discontinued the "Groovin' Oldies" format, and WKWM had switched to adult standards with the Music of Your Life from Jones Radio Networks, to compete with 810 WMJH (which aired Westwood One's AM Only/Adult Standards feed). However, WKWM remained mired near the bottom of the ratings, and neither WKWM nor WMJH was ultimately able to make enough money to stay afloat. WMJH has since switched to a Spanish-language format.

In June 2003, the WJNZ calls moved to AM 1140 from co-owned AM 1680, which switched to ABC's Radio Disney feed as WDSS (now talk radio station WPRR). The following year, Michael St. Cyr, under the licensee name of "WJNZ Radio, LLC", acquired WJNZ from Goodrich Radio.

WJNZ "1140 Jamz" billed itself as "The Pulse of the City" and "Grand Rapids' Only R&B Station." Programming was a combination of local hosts and ABC Radio's syndicated Urban AC format known as "The Touch" (or "Today's R&B and Old School"). WJNZ was also Grand Rapids' outlet for the popular Tom Joyner syndicated morning show.

On June 9, 2009, WJNZ Radio, LLC was placed into involuntary receivership, according to FCC records. The Kent County circuit court assigned the license to Amicus Management, a company headed by Daniel J. Yeomans.

The Urban AC format and "Jamz" name were moved to 1530 WYGR.

The station's callsign was changed to WVHF on April 13, 2010, while it was silent. The station began broadcasting again on December 25, 2010, with its new Catholic radio programming.
