= KBIL =

KBIL may refer to:

- The ICAO code for Billings Logan International Airport
- KBIL (FM), an FM radio station licensed to Park City, Montana, United States
- Identification used from 1949 to 1983 by a carrier current radio station operated at Saint Louis University (now KSLU)
