= KSLU =

KSLU may refer to:

- KSLU (FM), radio station (90.9 FM) licensed to Hammond, Louisiana, United States
- KSLU (Saint Louis University), student media organization at Saint Louis University, Missouri
