= WWCS =

- Canonsburg, Pennsylvania; United States
- Broadcast area: Greater Pittsburgh
- Frequency: 540 kHz

Programming
- Format: Religious

Ownership
- Owner: Birach Broadcasting Corporation

History
- First air date: November 27, 1957; 68 years ago

Technical information
- Licensing authority: FCC
- Facility ID: 5349
- Class: B
- Power: 5,000 watts (day); 500 watts (night)
- Transmitter coordinates: 40°17′22″N 80°11′7″W

Links
- Public license information: Public file; LMS
- Website: www.birach.com/wwcs.html

WWCS (540 kHz) is a commercial AM radio station licensed to Canonsburg, Pennsylvania, and serving the Pittsburgh metropolitan area. WWCS airs a religious format programmed by Overcomer Ministries. The station is owned by Birach Broadcasting Corporation through its chairman and CEO, Sima Birach Jr.

WWCS is powered at 5,000 watts by day. But AM 540 is a Canadian and Mexican clear channel frequency. So at night, WWCS must reduce its power to 500 watts to avoid interference. It uses a directional antenna at all times. The transmitter is off Angerer Road in Canonsburg.

== History ==
On November 27, 1957, the station first signed on as WCNG. At first, it was a daytimer station, required to go off the air at night. Its power was only 250 watts. The original owner was R.A. Douglass.

At various times in its history, the station has aired Spanish language, tropical music, children's radio, classical music, ethnic programming, oldies and Christian talk and teaching.

The station's call sign later switched to WARO. It was known as "Radio One" during its days as WARO.

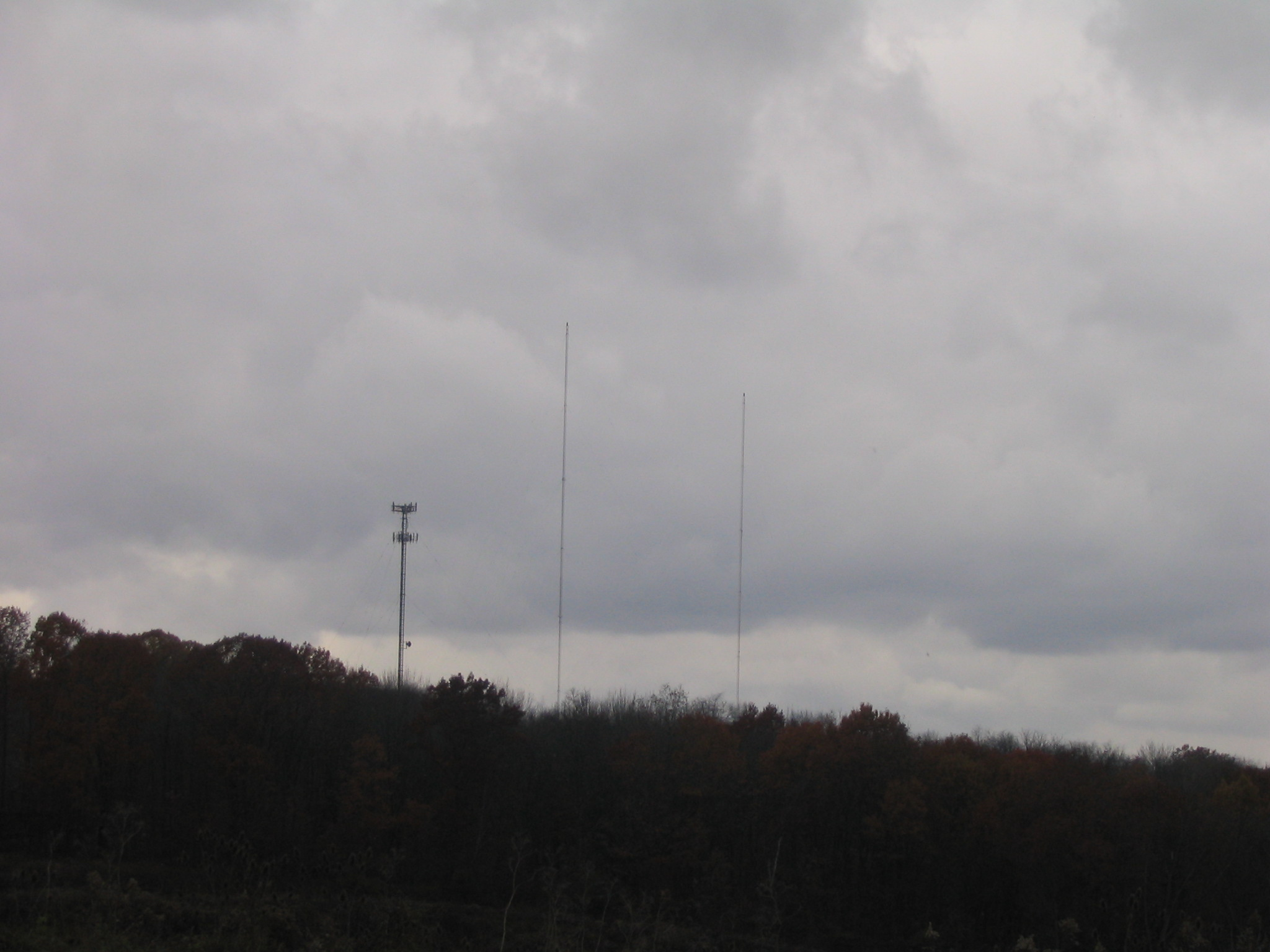
WWCS transmitter site, just off I-79 behind Southpointe Industrial Park.

Following ABC's LMA of WWCS from owner Birach Broadcasting, operations for the station moved from its transmitter building at 38 Angerer Road (Strang Lane) in Canonsburg to 400 Ardmore Boulevard in Wilkinsburg, the home of WEAE (ESPN Radio 1250) and WTAE-TV. Under ABC, the station carried Radio Disney format on February 11, 2001.

WWCS ceased to carry Radio Disney upon the expiration of ABC's lease of WWCS on December 31, 2010; the network's programming then moved to Disney-owned WEAE (renamed WDDZ), which disaffiliated from ESPN Radio. From January to February 2011, the station aired a music loop directing listeners to WDDZ.

In February 2011, a Spanish language tropical music format began airing as a simulcast of WSDS from Detroit. The simulcast was replaced by Fox Sports Radio programming on January 1, 2012. The Fox Sports network was previously cleared in Pittsburgh on WBGG, which dropped it when it replaced WEAE as the area's ESPN Radio affiliate.

It later switched to the Houston-based SB Nation Sports Network, which changed its name to SportsMap in 2020.

In October 2021, the station switched to a religious format carrying programming by the late R.G. Stair's Overcomer Ministries 24/7.

In 2025, WWCS suffered the loss of both its main provider of programming and its owner, after Overcomer Ministries withdrew its programming from most of its stations in July and Sima Birach died on October 14.
