= WCBW =

WCBW may refer to:

- WCBW-FM, a radio station (89.7 FM), licensed to serve East St. Louis, Illinois, United States
- WIJR, a radio station (880 AM), licensed to serve Highland, Illinois, which held the call sign WCBW from 2001 to 2006
- WCBS-TV, a television station (channel 2), licensed to serve New York, New York, United States, which held the call sign WCBW from 1941 to 1946
