= WBVA =

WBVA may refer to:

- WBGN (FM), a radio station (102.3 FM) licensed to serve Munfordville, Kentucky, United States, which held the call sign WBVA from 2021 to 2022
- WBVA (AM), a defunct radio station (1450 AM) formerly licensed to serve Bayside, Virginia, United States
