= WSDS =

Coordinates: 42°15′42″N 83°37′10″W

- Salem Township, Michigan; United States
- Broadcast area: Washtenaw County, Michigan
- Frequency: 1480 kHz
- Branding: La Explosiva (The Explosive One)

Programming
- Format: Spanish Contemporary Music

Ownership
- Owner: Baudelio Vazquez; (Vazquez Broadcasting Corporation)

History
- First air date: 1963; 63 years ago
- Former call signs: WYSI (1963-1966)
- Call sign meaning: We Serve Detroit's Suburbs

Technical information
- Licensing authority: FCC
- Facility ID: 35335
- Class: B
- Power: 750 watts day 3,800 watts night

Links
- Public license information: Public file; LMS

WSDS (1480 kHz) is a commercial AM radio station in Salem Township, Michigan. Known as "La Explosiva," WSDS carries a Spanish-language Contemporary Music radio format, featuring Regional Mexican, Romantica, Spanish Rock, Salsa, Hurban, and Reggaeton.

By day, WSDS is powered at 750 watts. But in unusual move, it increases its power to 3,800 watts at night. To protect other stations on 1480 AM from interference, it uses a directional antenna with a three-tower array. The transmitter is on West Clark Road at Laforge Road in Superior Charter Township, Michigan.

== History ==
The station began broadcasting in 1963 as WYSI. This call sign stood for the original city of license, YpSIlanti. The first format was Top 40 hits. By 1966, the station switched to a country music format.

In 1968, WSDS adopted a strategy of focusing on the western suburbs of Detroit, using the slogan "We Serve Detroit's Suburbs" and sending its broadcasting van to events in the area. By the early 2000s, "Suds" was still playing country music but had become a classic country station. Weekends included specialty programming in Chinese and Spanish, as well as some classic rock and roll oldies.

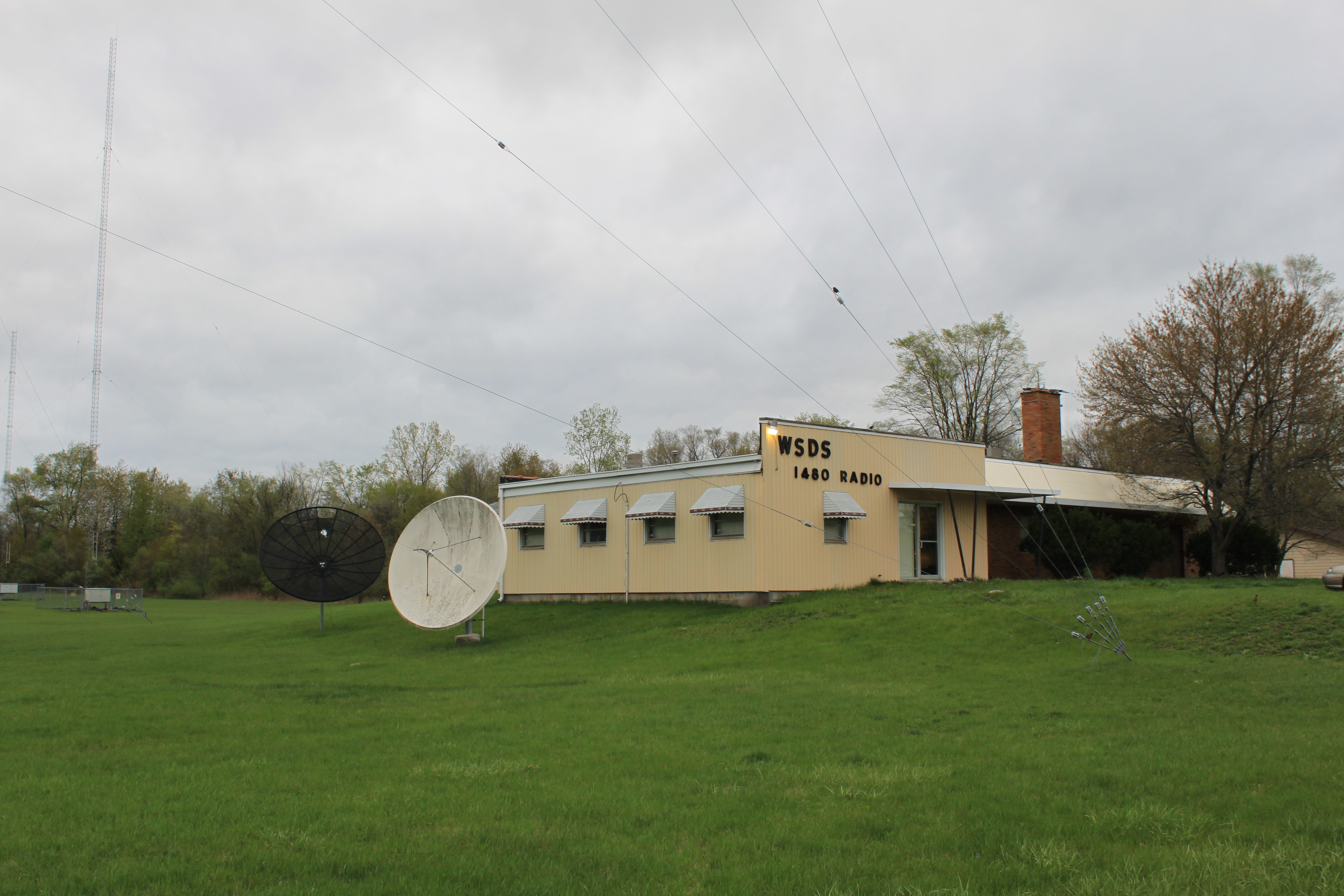
WSDS studio

Former logo

"La Explosiva" was born in July 2001 when Alex Resendez and Rafael Barrios, two local Mexican-American radio personalities, leased time on WSDS for three hours of Regional Mexican music programming weekly. By 2005, the station, by then sold to ethnic broadcaster Sima Birach of Birach Broadcasting, was airing five hours of "La Explosiva" programming six days a week. In June of that year, "La Explosiva" became a 24-hour format over WSDS.

As of February 2011, programming was simulcast on WWCS in Pittsburgh. But on January 1, 2012, that station's format changed to Fox Sports Radio.

In April 2012, Birach sold WSDS, pending FCC approval, to Vazquez Broadcasting. The sale was consummated on July 1, 2013, at a price of $1.45 million.

Until WDTW 1310 AM adopted a similar format in 2016, WSDS was the only full-time Spanish-language radio station on traditional analog radio serving the Detroit area.
