= WCXI =

Radio station in Fenton, Michigan

- Fenton, Michigan; United States
- Broadcast area: Metro Detroit and Flint
- Frequency: 1160 kHz
- Branding: Cool 1160

Programming
- Format: Classic Hits

Ownership
- Owner: Birach Broadcasting Corporation
- Operator: Revolving Door Media

History
- First air date: November 15, 1985
- Former call signs: WFEN (1985–1990); WACY (1990–1992); WCXI (1992–1993); WWON (1993–2000)
- Call sign meaning: Formerly used on WDFN and WMXD in Detroit. It used to stand for “Country Eleven,” but now stands for “We’re Cool Eleven.”

Technical information
- Licensing authority: FCC
- Facility ID: 10475
- Class: B
- Power: 15,000 watts (day); 400 watts (night)
- Transmitter coordinates: 42°32′39″N 83°33′36″W (day); 42°32′39″N 83°33′34″W (night)

Links
- Public license information: Public file; LMS
- Webcast: Listen live; stream also available through TuneIn
- Website: www.birach.com/wcxi

WCXI (1160 AM) is a commercial radio station licensed to Fenton, Michigan, United States, serving both Metro Detroit and the Flint area. It is owned by the Birach Broadcasting Corporation, is operated under the control of Revolving Door Media as "Cool 1160".

The transmitter is off North Maple Avenue in Milford Charter Township, Michigan.

== History ==
The station signed on the air on November 15, 1985. The original call sign was WFEN. It had a Middle of the Road (MOR) format. In its early years, it tried several other formats including country, oldies, urban gospel and classic country.

As of September 2010, WCXI has dropped its classic country format and switched back to oldies in a temporary relocation of the format of sister station WPON 1460 AM in Walled Lake, Michigan. The station received a construction permit to increase its daytime power to 15,000 watts, effectively making it a suburban Detroit station. WPON went silent in October 2010 so improvements could be made to its signal with WPON's programming continuing on WCXI.

The WCXI call letters were used in Detroit from the late 1970s to the early 1990s at what is now WDFN 1130 AM, and also in the early 1980s as WCXI-FM at 92.3 FM (now WMXD). It has also been used at 1450 AM in Jackson, Michigan. Fittingly, all stations previously using the WCXI call sign played country music.

A new transmitter site was proposed in Milford Township, Michigan to serve both WCXI and WPON.

WCXI 1130 was widely known throughout Detroit's large Indian American and South Asian population. It had many shows featuring Hindi and other Indian language songs in the superhit Rockin' Raaga hosted by Anu, Geetmala and Voice of Pakistan. WPON returned to the air in late 2019 and re-assumed the oldies format that had been airing on WCXI. At that time, WCXI switched to an automated mix of pop music in various languages.

On June 29, 2020 WCXI flipped to talk from Fox News Radio.

The station flipped less than two years later on May 9, 2022 to the Overcomer Ministry radio broadcasts, consisting of recordings of the preaching of radio evangelist Brother Stair, heard 24/7.

In 2026, the station was bought by the Birach Broadcasting Corporation, with operations on their behalf assumed by a locally-based group known as Revolving Door Media. On August 27, 2026 at 1PM, Birach and Revolving Door officially assumed operations and the station began stunting for a new format. The stunt consisted of two news clips on loop from WCSC-TV and WCBD-TV containing interviews with several individuals alleging sexual assault and abuse from Reverend Ralph Gordon Stair of the Overcomer Ministry. On September 15, 2026 at 7:30PM, a "second phase" of the stunt began, where music was interspersed between the news clips. The music contained titles and themes mocking Brother Stair, such as "Little Girls" by Oingo Boingo, "Super Freak" by Rick James, and "The Sex Offender Shuffle" by Scott Gairdner, among others. On September 21, early in the morning, the station added a third teaser promoting "something big" coming on Friday, September 25, at 10AM. By this time, the stunt had begun a reactivated TuneIn webstream under the brand "Cool 1160". The format, based on the explanation given on the webstream, is expected to be a classic hits format in a matter done to similarly-relaunched WCAR, similarly operated by Birach and Revolving Door Media, with the relaunch set to occur at the time promised.

On Friday, September 25th, 2026 at 10AM, WCXI officially relaunched as Cool 1160. The first song played under the new format was "Cool Change" by Little River Band.
