= WBRD =

- Palmetto, Florida; United States
- Broadcast area: Bradenton and Tampa, Florida
- Frequency: 1420 kHz

Programming
- Format: Religious broadcasting

Ownership
- Owner: Birach Broadcasting Corporation
- Operator: Faith Cathedral Fellowship, Inc.

History
- First air date: October 24, 1957
- Call sign meaning: Bradenton

Technical information
- Licensing authority: FCC
- Facility ID: 63985
- Class: B
- Power: 2,500 watts (day); 1,000 watts (night)
- Transmitter coordinates: 27°32′42″N 82°34′28″W

Links
- Public license information: Public file; LMS
- Webcast: Listen live

WBRD (1420 AM) is a radio station licensed to Palmetto, Florida, United States. The station is owned by Birach Broadcasting Corporation.

As of 2021, WBRD is currently being rented out full-time to Faith Cathedral Fellowship, Inc. and broadcasts Brother Stair's sermons. Prior to 2021, it was branded as Radio Lider, a Regional Mexican-focused radio, news, and talk station.

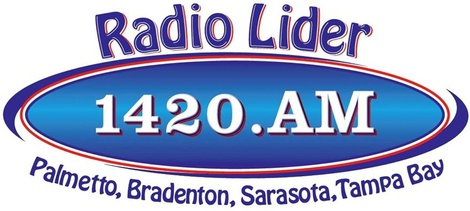
WBRD's logo, while being branded as "Radio Lider"

The FCC first licensed this station to begin operations on July 31, 1958, using callsign WBRD.
