= Argus-Press =

Newspaper published in Owosso

The Argus-Press
- Type: Daily newspaper
- Owner: Boone Newsmedia
- Publisher: Sheila Mondeau
- Managing editor: John Schneider
- Founded: 1854 (as the American)
- Headquarters: Owosso, Michigan
- Circulation: 5,506 Daily; 5,506 Sunday (as of 2022)
- OCLC number: 36134862
- Website: argus-press.com

The Argus-Press is a daily newspaper published in Owosso, Michigan. The name comes from two preceding papers: the Evening Argus and Press-American, which merged in 1916. The paper's earliest antecedent is the Owosso American, which was founded in 1854. The Campbell family sold the paper in 2025 to Boone Newsmedia.

== See also ==
- WOAP
