= WMJH =

Radio station in Rockford, Michigan

- Rockford, Michigan; United States
- Broadcast area: Grand Rapids Metro
- Frequency: 810 kHz
- Branding: La Poderosa

Programming
- Language: Spanish
- Format: Regional Mexican

Ownership
- Owner: Cynthia Citlalick Cano; (Cano's Broadcasting, LLC)
- Sister stations: WOAP

History
- First air date: 1965
- Former call signs: WJPW (1965-1991); WBYY (1991-1995); WISZ (1995-1996)

Technical information
- Licensing authority: FCC
- Facility ID: 55300
- Class: D
- Power: 3,600 watts daytime only
- Transmitter coordinates: 43°7′5.1″N 85°34′46.1″W
- Translator: (93.3 MHz) W227CG (Grand Rapids)

Links
- Public license information: Public file; LMS
- Website: mipoderosaradio.com

WMJH (810 AM) is a radio station broadcasting a Spanish-language regional Mexican music format under the name "La Poderosa", licensed in Rockford, Michigan, and serving the Grand Rapids market. Owned by Cynthia Citlalick Cano, through licensee Cano's Broadcasting, LLC, WMJH broadcasts with 3,600 watts of power during the day, which, along with its lower dial position, allows it to be heard as far north as Kalkaska, Michigan, as far east as Redford, Michigan, and as far south as Three Rivers, Michigan. It but must sign off at night to protect WGY in Schenectady, New York. WMJH programming is available around the clock on FM translator W227CG 93.3 FM, licensed to Grand Rapids.

== History ==
AM 810 began operations in 1965 as WJPW and featured a MOR/adult contemporary music format for many years. In 1991 the station was sold and the calls were changed to WBYY. During this time the station's studios were moved from Rockford to 29th Street in Grand Rapids. AM Stereo was also added during this time. In 1996 the station's calls were changed again and from 1996 to 2004, WMJH was known as "Magic 810", airing a satellite-fed adult standards format from Westwood One. "Magic 810", which also broadcast in AM stereo for a time, had a loyal audience and respectable ratings for an AM daytimer, but was chiefly popular with listeners aged 55 and older, which led Birach Broadcasting Corporation to switch the station's format to brokered Spanish programming, under the name "La Poderosa" (Spanish for "the powerful one") using the slogan "Con Sentimiento Mexicano".

On November 7, 2008, the "La Poderosa" programming and format moved to WMFN AM 640, after that station's prior lessee, Tyrone Bynum, vacated the station, which, at that point, WMJH retooled its format to lean more towards Spanish-language adult contemporary.

In April 2012, Birach Broadcasting sold WMJH, along with WOAP in Owosso, Michigan, to Cano's Broadcasting. The deal was never consummated.

In July 2013, the station changed its format to oldies, branded as "Super Hits 810" (pronounced "eight-one-oh"), effectively swapping with WOAP. The station afterwards since shifted towards a classic hits format focusing primarily on hits from the 1970s, 1980s and 1990s, competing with WFGR.

On October 13, 2014, WMJH discontinued the classic hits format in favor of a return to full-time Spanish language regional Mexican music programming and a return to the "La Poderosa" name. WMFN assumed the Spanish pop format heard on AM 810 from 2008 to 2013.

On March 2, 2015, WMJH launched an FM channel on 93.3 FM, becoming the first all-Spanish radio station to broadcast on the FM frequency in the Grand Rapids market.

On September 2, 2015, Birach Broadcasting once again sold WMJH and WOAP to Cano's Broadcasting, LLC. The sale, at a price of $1.1 million, was consummated on January 1, 2016.
