= WTOR =

Radio station in Youngstown, New York

- Youngstown, New York; United States
- Broadcast area: Buffalo, New York; Niagara Peninsula; Toronto, Ontario
- Frequency: 770 kHz

Programming
- Format: Brokered South Asian

Ownership
- Owner: Birach Broadcasting Corporation
- Operator: Radio Saaz-o-Awaz (via LMA)

History
- First air date: March 26, 1991; 34 years ago (initial licensing date)
- Call sign meaning: Toronto

Technical information
- Licensing authority: FCC
- Facility ID: 74121
- Class: D
- Power: 13,000 watts (daytime only)
- Transmitter coordinates: 43°13′5″N 78°56′53″W

Links
- Public license information: Public file; LMS
- Website: eawaz.com

WTOR (770 AM, branded e:Awaz) is a daytime-only radio station licensed to Youngstown, New York, and serving the Golden Horseshoe of Ontario, Canada. The station is owned by Birach Broadcasting Corporation and operated by Canadian businesswoman Arifa Muzaffar under a local marketing agreement (LMA). All programming originates from studios in Mississauga, Ontario, which is sent to the station in Youngstown, then blasted back across the border to Toronto (in an example of rimshotting).

e:Awaz airs a brokered multicultural radio format, targeted primarily at the Pakistani Canadian and Punjabi Canadian community in the Greater Toronto Area, and Niagara Peninsula in Canada. The station's programming is primarily in Punjabi and Urdu. Some programs are aimed at Sikhs and other religious and ethnic groups from South Asia. Birach Broadcasting maintains nominal ownership of the station to meet FCC regulations that prohibit foreign nationals from owning controlling stakes in U.S. radio licenses.

WTOR is a daytime-only station, signing off at sunset to protect 50,000-watt Class A clear-channel station WABC in New York City. WTOR's 13,000-watt directional signal is aimed almost completely into the province of Ontario. The station's transmitter is located off Langdon Road in Ransomville, New York.
