= KOLE =

Coordinates: 29°54′15″N 93°56′10″W

- Port Arthur, Texas; United States
- Frequency: 1340 kHz

Programming
- Language: English
- Format: Classic country

Ownership
- Owner: Birach Broadcasting Corporation

History
- First air date: March 30, 1947

Technical information
- Licensing authority: FCC
- Facility ID: 62238
- Class: C
- Power: 1,000 watts

Links
- Public license information: Public file; LMS
- Website: kole1340.com

KOLE (1340 AM) is a radio station licensed to Port Arthur, Texas, United States. The station airs classic country music and is owned by Birach Broadcasting Corporation.

== History ==
A four-person consortium trading as the Port Arthur Broadcasting Company applied to the Federal Communications Commission (FCC) on March 23, 1946, for permission to build a new radio station on 1340 kHz in Port Arthur, to broadcast with 250 watts day and night. The principals had worked at newspapers and radio stations in nearby Beaumont. The FCC granted the application on November 27 and issued the construction permit on December 11. Promising "good music, late news, all sports", KOLE began broadcasting at noon on March 30, 1947. By the end of 1948, only two of the four principals, Mary Ann Petru and Socs N. Vratis, owned the company. The station would eventually evolve into Port Arthur's heritage Top 40 station, with popular personalities playing contemporary music. In one case, one disc jockey, Ricci Ware, challenged another, Dick Harvey, to a cow-milking contest on the streets of the city.

Petru and Vratis sold KOLE in 1959 to Radio Southwest, Inc. This firm was a partnership between John Hicks, who moved his family from Dallas to Port Arthur, and Edward L. Francis. The station moved from its original studios on Fourth Street to a new facility in the Adams Building. During his father's ownership, John's son Tom, then in high school, worked at KOLE as a disc jockey under the on-air name of Steve King. Tom Hicks went on to be a major private equity investor, including in the radio business. John Hicks sold his interest to Francis four years later in order to buy KFDM radio and television in Beaumont. Francis died in 1969; Radio Southwest continued under bank ownership, increasing power to 1,000 watts in 1971 and then selling to the Gulf States Broadcasting Company in 1972. Gulf States's owners had broadcast and other interests in Dallas and Las Vegas. Northstar Broadcasting purchased KOLE in 1977, creating an AM-FM combo with the acquisition the next year of KZOM-FM 104.5 in Orange. By this time, KOLE had evolved from Top 40 to adult contemporary, having briefly attempted a country music format at the start of the 1980s.

KOLE was then sold to Center Group Broadcasting, based in Tyler, in 1982. Center Group attempted to restore some local programming with an emphasis on Port Arthur while also using a satellite-delivered format for most of the music. Insufficient advertiser support led to the cutting back of a briefly restored live morning show.

UNO Broadcasting of Joliet, Illinois, acquired KKMY and KOLE in 1988 from Center Group. In 1989, KOLE dropped adult contemporary for an adult standards format of "memory music" as well as local sports coverage; the main offices had relocated to Beaumont, though at least one member of the air staff, Lee Gower, worked out of the Port Arthur studio, which was commented to be dusty and featured several holes in the floor. This changed in 1991, when studios for both stations moved to a new facility in Beaumont.

Uno Broadcasting was forced into involuntary bankruptcy in 1994 after its owner—Robert Tezak, the one-time owner of the card game Uno—fell into financial trouble as a result of an unrelated court case. In 1987, he was alleged to have ordered the arson of a bowling alley he owned in order to collect insurance payments. While awaiting trial in that case, he was arrested for intimidating a witness—his former wife—by sending her a death threat. When a court ordered him to put aside $400,000 in restitution after being convicted in March 1994, he filed bankruptcy for himself, his wife, and three businesses, one of them UNO Broadcasting. The filings were made in large part to try and regain control of the radio stations, which had been placed in court-appointed receivership. Two years later, as part of the purchase of the pair by GulfStar Broadcasting (a division of Capstar, the broadcasting company founded by Tom Hicks), the license for KOLE was assigned to Citygate Media, a part of Voice in the Wilderness Broadcasting, for $80,000; the receiver had permitted GulfStar to designate an assignee for KOLE. Voice in the Wilderness operated KOLE with a Christian radio format.

Birach Broadcasting Corporation purchased KOLE from Citygate Media in 2008; at the time, KOLE's format consisted mostly of syndicated conservative talk shows.

In 2016, One Point Media, a company owned by Torey Doucette, filed to purchase KOLE from Birach for $400,000, but no deal was ever consummated. The station was damaged in Hurricane Harvey when flooding swamped the transmitter site.

In February 2026, the station switched to classic country, focusing on songs and artists from the 1990s.
