= WALD =

- Johnsonville, South Carolina; United States
- Frequency: 1080 kHz

Programming
- Format: Urban Gospel; Christian Talk and Teaching

Ownership
- Owner: Glory Communications, Inc.

Technical information
- Licensing authority: FCC
- Facility ID: 27463
- Class: D
- Power: 9,000 watts days 2,700 watts critical hours
- Transmitter coordinates: 33°54′36.00″N 79°40′09.00″W
- Translators: 98.7 W254DG (Scranton, SC)

Links
- Public license information: Public file; LMS
- Website: WorshipAndWordNetwork.com

WALD (1080 kHz) is an AM radio station licensed to Johnsonville, South Carolina. The station is part of the Worship and Word Network and is owned by Glory Communications, Inc., based in St. Stephen, South Carolina. It carries an Urban Gospel radio format including Christian talk and teaching programs. WALD serves an area of South Carolina located between Charleston, Myrtle Beach and Florence.

WALD is a daytimer station. By day, it is powered at 9,000 watts, using a non-directional antenna. But because AM 1080 is a clear channel frequency reserved for KRLD Dallas and WTIC Hartford, WALD must sign off at sunset to avoid interference. During critical hours, the station broadcasts at 2,700 watts.

WALD programming is simulcast on FM translator station W254DG at 98.7 MHz in Scranton, South Carolina.
