= WWRB =

Shortwave radio station in Morrison, Tennessee

Coordinates: 35.622794°N 86.014127°W

- Morrison, Tennessee; United States
- Broadcast area: the Americas, the Caribbean, Europe, Africa, Middle East and Asia
- Frequency: See Historical Frequencies
- Branding: World Wide Religious Broadcasting

Programming
- Language: English
- Format: Brokered

Ownership
- Owner: Airline Transport Communications Incorporated (formerly Blue Ridge Communications, Inc); (David Frantz, owner)

History
- First air date: c.2002
- Call sign meaning: World Wide Religious Broadcasting; World Wide Radio Broadcasting

Links
- Website: www.wwrb.org (historical)

WWRB was a shortwave international broadcasting station known as both "World Wide Religious Broadcasting" and (to a lesser extent) "World Wide Radio Broadcasting" broadcasting from Morrison, Tennessee. It was a subsidiary of Airline Transport Communications Incorporated. The station featured primarily Christian religious programming.

WWRB quietly ceased shortwave broadcasting at the end of 2020 and continued operating solely as an Internet station. Owner David Frantz died January 2, 2022.

== Transmitters ==
WWRB uses four 100 kW to 150 kW transmitters and six antennas to provide their services to regions of the world specifically requested by broadcasters. WWRB operated 24 hours a day, seven days a week, changing frequencies as shortwave propagation changes to maintain their target reception areas. Their main targeted services are titled Global-I through Global-IV.

- Global-I served Europe, Middle East, Africa
- Global-II served Australia and was leased part-time by Churches of Christ in 2011.
- Global-III served Europe, Middle East, Northern Africa, Canada, and Asia and was leased full-time by Overcomer Ministry
- Global-IV served Canada, and Asia and was leased full-time by Overcomer Ministry for a time. Was leased to a propagation study as of 2012.

== Historical Frequencies ==
- Global-I: 2012: 3.215 and 3.195 MHz, 45° Dual feed Rhombic antenna
- Global-II: 2012: 5.05 MHz, 150° Dual feed wide spaced Yagi antenna
- Global-III: 2012: 9.285 and 3.185 MHz, 340° Dual feed rhombic antenna
- Global-IV: 2012: Leased for a shortwave propagation study

WWRB was last listed on the FCC frequency schedule in northern Summer 2021: 5.05 MHz from 2200-1300 UTC. In February 2023, the 5.05 frequency was reallocated to WRMI, where it is used by the "WRMI Legends" oldies service founded by Ted Randall and continued by Randall's estate. 3.215 has since been reallocated to WWCR.
