= WCXN =

- Claremont, North Carolina; United States
- Frequency: 1170 kHz

Programming
- Format: Religious

Ownership
- Owner: Birach Broadcasting Corporation

History
- First air date: September 5, 1985

Technical information
- Licensing authority: FCC
- Facility ID: 71306
- Class: D
- Power: 7,700 watts day; 1,000 watts critical hours
- Transmitter coordinates: 35°43′34.48″N 81°8′51.29″W

Links
- Public license information: Public file; LMS

WCXN (1170 AM) is a radio station broadcasting a religious format. Licensed to Claremont, North Carolina, United States, the station is owned by Birach Broadcasting.

== History ==
WCXN went on the air September 5, 1985. In 1989, Don Lee was general manager of WCXN and WPAR-FM, which played Southern gospel music.

In the early 1990s, Robert Barnette, a Taylorsville minister who helped raise money for WPAR, started a show on WCXN. He was soon joined by Dean "Bubba" Lilly. Their "Swap Shop" program could be heard in 17 counties, but it was not just the merchandise, described as "tacky". Announcer Jim Stinson said, "We're laughing ourselves silly with Barnette and Lilly."

In August 1997, WCXN switched to Spanish language programming. Soon after that, the station added a Hmong show on Sunday mornings. Just over a year later, the Hmong show had expanded from 90 minutes to four hours. In 2007, Hmong programming aired on Saturday mornings as well.

Birach Broadcasting Corp. bought WCXN from Davidson Media Group LLC in 2007.
