= KSBQ =

Radio station in Santa Maria, California

- Santa Maria, California; United States
- Broadcast area: Lompoc, California
- Frequency: 1480 kHz
- Branding: La Mexicana 102.9 y 1480 AM

Programming
- Format: Ranchera

Ownership
- Owner: Lazer Media; (Lazer Licenses, LLC)
- Sister stations: KLMM, KSMY

History
- First air date: September 1, 1961
- Former call signs: KSEE (1961–1980)
- Call sign meaning: Santa Maria-style barbecue

Technical information
- Licensing authority: FCC
- Facility ID: 38442
- Class: D
- Power: 1,000 watts (day); 61 watts (night)
- Transmitter coordinates: 34°57′1.9″N 120°29′25.6″W
- Translator: 102.9 K275CJ (Santa Maria)

Links
- Public license information: Public file; LMS
- Webcast: Listen live
- Website: www.lamexicanaradio.net/santamaria

KSBQ (1480 AM, "La Mexicana 102.9 y 1480 AM") is a commercial radio station licensed to Santa Maria, California, United States, and serves the Santa Maria—Lompoc area. The station is owned by Lazer Media and broadcasts a regional Mexican format. Programming is also relayed over low-power FM translator K275CJ (102.9 FM).

KSBQ was established in 1961 as KSEE, Santa Maria's fourth radio station, and aired Top 40 and adult contemporary formats in its first two decades of operation. After becoming country music-formatted KSBQ in 1980, the station switched to Spanish-language broadcasting in 1984 and, with the exception of a short-lived sports talk format in 1999, has remained such ever since.

== History ==
=== KSEE ===
Bakersfield radio and TV station owner Edward E. Urner and Bryan J. Coleman, doing business as Cal-Coast Broadcasters, obtained a construction permit from the Federal Communications Commission for a new radio station to operate with 1,000 watts during daylight hours only on November 2, 1960. Cal-Coast was approved to place the radio station's transmitter facility near the Santa Maria sewer farm on Black Road, and the new station made its debut on September 1, 1961, with the call sign KSEE and airing a Top 40 pop music format. Urner became the sole owner of Cal-Coast shortly after KSEE began broadcasting.

In 1965, Urner sold KSEE to Frank G. Macomber IV of White Plains, New York, for $153,750, after Urner had been named general manager of KEWB in Oakland. Macomber moved to Santa Maria and operated the station for five years. On August 7, 1970, an application was filed to transfer the station's license back to Urner with a new business partner; the transaction was pending FCC approval when the 37-year-old Macomber was found dead in his home on September 16. KSEE general manager Ralph N. Boe was named special administrator of Macomber's estate after Bank of America, which had initially been named, expressed no interest in taking over operations; the court awarded this status to Boe so that the station could continue operations without interruption.

The FCC approved of the sale back to Urner in February 1971, and he returned to Santa Maria to resume operating KSEE along with business partner James Norman, with whom Urner owned KERN radio in Bakersfield. Norman became the sole owner the next year.

A new Cal-Coast Broadcasters purchased KSEE in 1975. This company was of no relation to the Urner groups and was owned by Buddy and Eleanor Black; it retained KSEE's format, which had shifted to adult contemporary music, and public affairs programming.

=== KSBQ ===
In May 1980, Cal-Coast sold KSEE to Los Padres Broadcasting Company for $450,000. On September 29, 1980, the new owner changed the station's call letters to KSBQ. It was nearly two months before the call sign change was announced, as well as the meaning of the new designation, representing the regional specialty of Santa Maria-style barbecue; the new call sign was accompanied by a format switch to country music. The KSEE call sign was nearly immediately recycled within California, being reused for a Fresno television station.

In 1984, KSBQ dropped its country format and became a Spanish-language radio station. Known as "Radio Pantera", among its offerings was a Spanish-language translation of the 6 p.m. newscast of local NBC affiliate KSBY-TV.

In March 1995, Los Padres Broadcasting Corporation traded KSBQ for another Spanish-language station, Lompoc's KTME (1410 AM), owned by Padre Serra Communications Inc., the broadcasting company of Jaime Bonilla Valdez; Bonilla, who had previously owned KJDJ (1030 AM), had become the main shareholder in Los Padres by this time. However, in March 1999, the station dropped its Spanish-language programming after nearly 15 years to flip to sports talk. A void for sports talk in the Santa Maria area had been created when KKAL (1280 AM) moved to a news/talk format, and a group led by former Detroit sportscaster and columnist Ron Cameron converted the station to sports. As a sports talk station, KSBQ picked up one of the features that had been heard on KKAL, its affiliation with the One-on-One Sports network, and aired Anaheim Angels games.

The sports talk format lasted less than a year. The station stopped broadcasting at the end of September after Cameron left to pursue a front-office position with a minor league baseball club in Lafayette, Louisiana. Furthermore, the city of Santa Maria was selling KSBQ equipment as "unclaimed personal property", likely in conjunction with a bankruptcy of which Bonilla did not inform the FCC; due to this omission and public file violations, KSBQ and two other Bonilla stations were fined $11,000 each in July 1999. By the fall of 1999, a buyer had been found for KSBQ: Oxnard-based Lazer Broadcasting Corporation, headed by Alfredo Plascencia, for $225,000.
