= KJMU =

Radio station in Sand Springs, Oklahoma

- Sand Springs, Oklahoma; United States
- Broadcast area: Tulsa metropolitan area
- Frequency: 1340 kHz
- Branding: AM 1340

Programming
- Format: Urban gospel

Ownership
- Owner: Birach Broadcasting Corporation

History
- First air date: July 22, 1961
- Former call signs: KTOW (1961–1999); KTFX (1999–2006); KTKX (2006–2007)

Technical information
- Licensing authority: FCC
- Facility ID: 47101
- Class: C
- Power: 500 watts (day); 1,000 watts (Night)
- Transmitter coordinates: 36°07′58″N 96°05′36″W

Links
- Public license information: Public file; LMS
- Webcast: Listen live

KJMU (1340 AM) is a radio station licensed to Sand Springs, Oklahoma, United States, serving the Tulsa metropolitan area. The station is owned by Birach Broadcasting Corporation.

== History ==
KJMU's format history includes country, top 40 and alternative rock as KTOW. The format was later switched to urban gospel as "Love Radio 1340" under KTOW calls, later changed to KTFX. The station aired an urban adult contemporary format as "Hot 1340 The Groove" under an local management agreement with Hardman Broadcasting, later changing to a Spanish format as "La Ley 1340" for a short time under Davidson Media ownership.

In November 2007, a deal was reached to sell KJMU and sister station KTUV to Birach Broadcasting Corporation (Sima Birach, president) for a reported sale price of $1.5 million.

Following several years of silence, KJMU returned to the air in May 2021 and switched back to an urban gospel format. From 2014 to 2021, KJMU was silenced four times, and in July 2022, the station entered a consent decree and was granted a short-term one year license renewal to resolve issues related to being silent for 50% of its previous license period.

From January to May 2023, KJMU went silent again, citing transmitter malfunctions, and in December, was again giving a one year license renewal, citing that "while the situation has improved, the station is still not living up to its 'basic duty' as a broadcaster".
