= WKBY =

Radio station in Chatham, Virginia

- Chatham, Virginia; United States
- Broadcast area: Danville, Virginia; Pittsylvania County, Virginia
- Frequency: 1080 kHz
- Branding: Inspirational 1080

Programming
- Format: Black Gospel; Religious

Ownership
- Owner: Lawrence Campbell; (Gloria Corporation)

History
- First air date: June 8, 1966

Technical information
- Licensing authority: FCC
- Facility ID: 72663
- Class: D
- Power: 1,000 watts (days only)
- Transmitter coordinates: 36°46′54.0″N 79°23′29.0″W

Links
- Public license information: Public file; LMS
- Webcast: Listen live
- Website: www.wkby1080.net

WKBY is a Black Gospel and Religious formatted broadcast radio station licensed to Chatham, Virginia, serving Danville and Pittsylvania County, Virginia. WKBY is owned and operated by Lawrence Campbell.
