= WYGR =

Radio station in Wyoming, Michigan

Coordinates: 42°55′38″N 85°44′50″W

- Wyoming, Michigan; United States
- Broadcast area: Grand Rapids metropolitan area
- Frequency: 1530 kHz
- Branding: Jethro FM

Programming
- Format: Classic country

Ownership
- Owner: WYGR, LLC

History
- First air date: 1964 (as WERX)
- Former call signs: WYGR (12/19/86-Present); WTKG (10/1/84-12/19/86); WYGR (3/11/1968-10/1/84); WERX (7/1/1963-3/11/1968); WYOQ (CP)(9/27/1962-7/1/1963)
- Call sign meaning: WYoming-Grand Rapids

Technical information
- Licensing authority: FCC
- Facility ID: 74248
- Class: D
- Power: 500 watts (Daytime); 250 watts (Critical Hours)
- Translators: 94.9 W235BN (Grand Rapids); 99.5 W258DF (Lowell)

Links
- Public license information: Public file; LMS
- Webcast: Listen Live
- Website: jethro.fm

WYGR (1530 AM, "Jethro FM") is a radio station broadcasting a classic country format, licensed to Wyoming, Michigan and serving the Grand Rapids area. The station operates with 500 watts during the day and 250 watts critical hours, but must sign off at night to protect 1530 WCKY in Cincinnati. WYGR programming is simulcast on FM translator W235BN at 94.9 FM, which can be heard in the immediate Grand Rapids area as far north as Cedar Springs and Allendale but gives way to co-channel WMMQ out of East Lansing east of Grand Rapids and fellow co-channel WKZC north and west of the Grand Rapids area. A second FM translator W258DF in Lowell was added in February 2019.

== History ==
The station was granted its first construction permit on September 27, 1962 and was originally assigned the calls WYOQ. The FCC reassigned the stations calls to WERX on July 1, 1963.

The station first began broadcasting in 1964 under the WERX call sign. WERX began as a MOR station but changed to Top 40 during the summer of 1965, and enjoyed moderate success as a Top 40 rocker until dropping the format in May 1968. The station's potential was always limited due to its poor signal and the fact that co-channel WCKY would begin to interfere with WERX's signal even before WERX's sign-off (and still does to this day). WERX provided an early air shift for John "Records" Landecker, later of WLS fame.

The station has also aired news/talk (as WTKG) and adult standards as well as Contemporary Christian music (as WYGR) formats. From 1999 until February 2010, the station featured a Spanish-language format known as "La Furia." The format consisted of a wide variety of different Spanish-language musical genres, including regional Mexican, grupera, ranchera, tropical, and mainstream Spanish pop and rock. Sunday programming included church services in Spanish and English as well as English-language polka and adult standards shows.

In early February 2010, the former owner of WJNZ 1140 AM "1140 Jamz," Robert S. Womack, moved that station's Urban AC format and air lineup to WYGR, in anticipation of WJNZ's switch to a Catholic religious format in the wake of its sale to Holy Family Radio. WJNZ, like WYGR, is a daytimer. It is unclear at this time if the WJNZ calls will migrate to 1530 AM to match the new format, but given the fact that WYGR now identifies as "GR1530," it seems unlikely.

WYGR also transmits FM rebroadcaster in the form of translator W235BN at 94.9 MHz, licensed to Grand Rapids. However, because of Lansing's WMMQ 94.9 there is slight interference, especially on the further east side of the city towards Kentwood. The translator will allow WYGR's programming to be heard around the clock. In February 2012, it was reported that the translator had begun operations at 94.9 FM.

On December 10, 2018, WYGR changed their format from urban adult contemporary to classic country, branded as "Jethro FM".

== Programming ==
The weekday hours previously consisted of the nationally syndicated Tom Joyner Morning Show, followed by the midday drive featuring local Disc Jockey "DJ Z". The afternoon drive is fueled by the political talk show named "The Pulse Of The City" Hosted by Station General Manager and community activist Robert S. Womack. On Thursdays and Fridays "The Maddog Show" featuring "DJ Maddog" airs at 6p.m.. The shows format veers from the Urban AC normally aired on the station to a Mainstream urban format. Maddog's personality is also a stark contrast of the political seriousness of "The Pulse of The City."

== FM urban radio in West Michigan ==
WYGR's FM translator represented the latest attempt to bring an FM R&B station to West Michigan. In 1993 the first attempt was launched at Muskegon's WMHG "Magic 108", also there was a second attempt with WKBZ launching as "Power 95.3" which have both since become defunct. Muskegon now has three FM stations catering to the Urban audience in the form of WUVS-LP 103.7 for hip-hop, WUGM-LP 106.1 for classic R&B, and WVIB 100.1 for Urban AC.

In 1994, Goodrich would tweak WSNX's Top-40 format into a Rhythmic Top 40 direction giving a more Urban Flavor in the Grand Rapids/Muskegon area. The Rhythmic direction has continued under Clear Channel's ownership. WSNX also features a prepackaged Hip-Hop/R&B format from Clear Channel on its HD-2 side channel.
