= WNWI =

Multicultural radio station in Oak Lawn, Illinois

- Oak Lawn, Illinois; United States
- Broadcast area: Chicago, Illinois
- Frequency: 1080 kHz

Programming
- Languages: Polish & others
- Format: Ethnic radio
- Affiliations: AP Radio

Ownership
- Owner: Birach Broadcasting Corporation
- Sister stations: WMFN

History
- First air date: December 31, 1965
- Call sign meaning: Northwest Indiana (region of original city of license, Valparaiso)

Technical information
- Licensing authority: FCC
- Facility ID: 49785
- Class: B
- Power: 5,000 watts (day); 2,600 watts (night)
- Transmitter coordinates: 41°38′34.12″N 87°38′44.17″W

Links
- Public license information: Public file; LMS
- Webcast: Listen live
- Website: www.birach.com/wnwi

WNWI (1080 AM) is a time brokered radio station broadcasting an ethnic radio format. Licensed to Oak Lawn, Illinois, United States, it serves the Chicago area. The station is currently owned by the Birach Broadcasting Corporation. WNWI operates on a clear-channel frequency, with WTIC in Hartford, Connecticut; and KRLD in Dallas, Texas, the dominant Class A stations.

WNWI's calls stand for "Northwestern Indiana", a reference to the station's former city of license of Valparaiso, Indiana. The station broadcast a full-service adult contemporary music format from Valparaiso from its sign-on in 1965 until the spring of 1998, when it officially moved into the Chicago market by changing its city of license to Oak Lawn and relocating its transmitter to Riverdale.

The bulk of WNWI's programming is Polish language music, news, and talk programming. Other weekday programming includes Serbian Radio Chicago, a one-hour radio show hosted by Milorad Ravasi which incorporates news, music, and interviews from Serbian culture. On weekends, programming blocks variously target the German, Macedonian, Polish, and Serbian communities.

== History ==
WNWI applied for its original license in 1962 when it was originally owned by the Hershman family in Valparaiso, Indiana. The FCC delayed the application process for nearly two years, when competitor WAKE was allowed to go on the air first. The ownership of WNWI sued the FCC because its application for a community AM radio station was already "in process" before WAKE's. The FCC ceded the hold on the license process and approved it immediately, which put two AM stations on the air at the same time in the small community in 1965.

The ownership applied for 1080 kHz because of its strategic location in the center of the AM band (hence its second moniker "The Center of The Dial", which extended to promos for news, weather and the like as your "news center", "weather center", etc., the station's main moniker "Your Live Leader" was used almost from its inception.) The AM band extended, at that time, from 540 to 1600 kHz, and the theory that an antenna built on the campus of the historic Valparaiso Technical Institute would have better radiation characteristics for a 250-watt daytime station at that frequency was a planned, engineering gamble which resulted in a 312-foot omnidirectional antenna system. Their expertise in electrical engineering of the site bore out this theory when the FCC issued the first permits for pre-sunrise operation at 9.7 watts. In 1984, the FCC issued a post-sunset license to the station for 9.7 watts and an omini-directional pattern. The radiation pattern was so efficient with 9.7 watts, that the signal from the 5/8-wavelength radiator could be heard as far away as Michigan City, Indiana, and Merrillville, Indiana, at night.

The station's format remained nearly unchanged for nearly 30 years until music license fees and finances forced the station to adopt a more talk-oriented format by the mid-1990s with limited music play. In the 1970s, WGN engineers studied the studio design at WNWI inside the Valpo Tech main hall to see how the audio and electrical engineers at the school built the studios with super-large plate-glass windows while maintaining excellent acoustics in the studios at that time. The studio design at WNWI was the inspiration for the large plate-glass window studios seen today for WGN radio on Michigan Avenue in Chicago. WBBM-TV even used the over-engineered tower structure at WNWI as a TV antenna relay for a brief period in the 1960s to improve TV service to Northwest Indiana until the Sears Tower was built and the CBS station could move its transmitter and antenna to the top of the new building. After that, the antenna relay was disassembled and all that remained of the support structure for the antenna were cross-arms, which can be seen on the original tower structure in Valparaiso, Indiana, to this day.

The station was sold in 1995 to Birach Broadcasting, who eventually moved the tower and transmitter location to Oak Lawn, Illinois, and applied to the FCC for a dramatic power increase.

The husband-wife Hershman family team who operated the station died a short time later from medical conditions that they had been battling for years.
