= Iraí =

Municipality of Rio Grande do Sul, Brazil

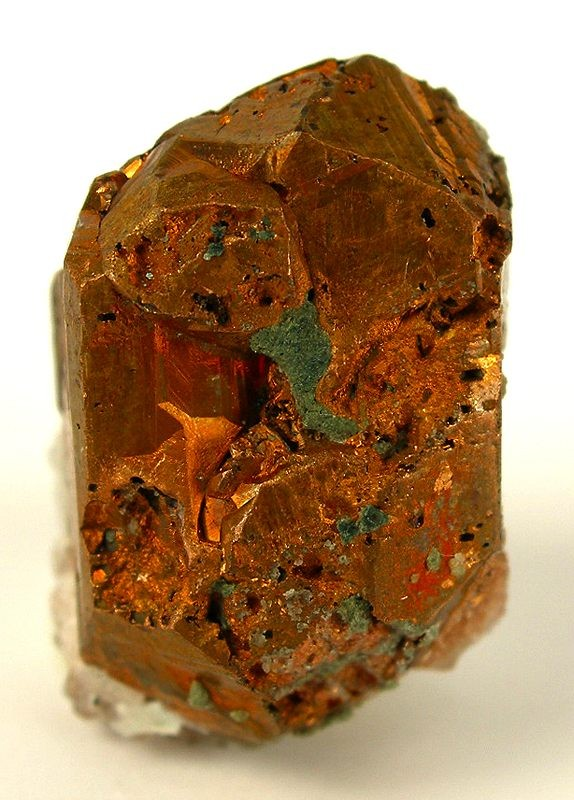
- Native copper from Iraí

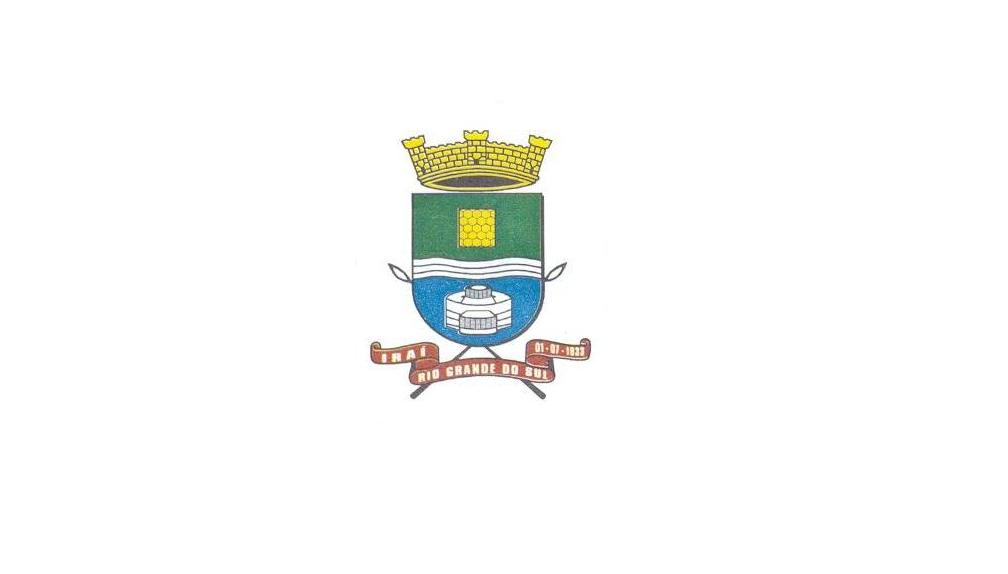
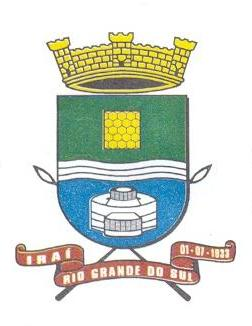
- Flag Coat of arms

- Location in Rio Grande do Sul State

- Location in Brazil
- Coordinates: 27°11′31.5″S 53°15′15.6″W
- Country: Brazil
- Region: South
- State: State of Rio Grande do Sul
- Founded: September 1, 1933

Area
  - Total: 181 km^{2} (70 sq mi)
- Elevation: 123 m (404 ft)

Population (2020)
  - Total: 7,141
  - Density: 44.64/km^{2} (115.6/sq mi)
- Demonym: Iraiense
- Time zone: UTC−3 (BRT)
- Postal code: 98460-000
- Website: http://www.irai.rs.gov.br/

Iraí is a municipality in the state of Rio Grande do Sul, Brazil.

== Geography ==
=== Climate ===
Climate data for Iraí (1981–2010)
Month	Jan	Feb	Mar	Apr	May	Jun	Jul	Aug	Sep	Oct	Nov	Dec	Year
Mean daily maximum °C (°F)	32.3 (90.1)	31.8 (89.2)	31.0 (87.8)	27.8 (82.0)	23.6 (74.5)	22.2 (72.0)	21.9 (71.4)	24.6 (76.3)	25.3 (77.5)	27.7 (81.9)	30.2 (86.4)	31.8 (89.2)	27.5 (81.5)
Daily mean °C (°F)	25.4 (77.7)	24.8 (76.6)	23.8 (74.8)	20.4 (68.7)	16.3 (61.3)	15.3 (59.5)	14.5 (58.1)	16.5 (61.7)	18.2 (64.8)	21.0 (69.8)	23.0 (73.4)	24.8 (76.6)	20.3 (68.5)
Mean daily minimum °C (°F)	20.0 (68.0)	19.7 (67.5)	18.6 (65.5)	15.5 (59.9)	11.9 (53.4)	10.9 (51.6)	9.8 (49.6)	11.0 (51.8)	12.9 (55.2)	15.9 (60.6)	16.8 (62.2)	19.1 (66.4)	15.2 (59.4)
Average precipitation mm (inches)	162.2 (6.39)	187.3 (7.37)	120.1 (4.73)	157.6 (6.20)	163.2 (6.43)	159.1 (6.26)	144.5 (5.69)	129.6 (5.10)	175.5 (6.91)	240.7 (9.48)	152.0 (5.98)	160.2 (6.31)	1,952 (76.9)
Average precipitation days (≥ 1.0 mm)	11	11	9	9	7	9	8	7	10	12	9	9	111
Average relative humidity (%)	70.7	74.3	74.9	78.5	82.7	84.0	81.0	76.0	73.5	73.8	70.2	68.9	75.7
Mean monthly sunshine hours	238.2	196.3	212.9	178.9	155.3	125.4	153.7	161.2	147.6	176.5	218.0	233.3	2,197.3
Source: Instituto Nacional de Meteorologia

== See also ==
- List of municipalities in Rio Grande do Sul
