= WVAB =

Radio station in Virginia Beach, Virginia, United States (1954–2018)

- Virginia Beach, Virginia; United States
- Broadcast area: Hampton Roads (limited)
- Frequency: 1550 kHz

Ownership
- Owner: Birach Broadcasting Corporation

History
- First air date: 1954
- Last air date: September 7, 2018 (date of license surrender)
- Former call signs: WBPA (1954); WAVA (1954); WBOF (1954–64); WKVK (1964–66)
- Former frequencies: 1600 kHz (1954–60)
- Call sign meaning: Virginia Beach

Technical information
- Facility ID: 57611
- Class: D
- Power: 5,000 watts (daytime); 9 watts (nighttime)
- Transmitter coordinates: 36°51′29.5″N 76°9′26.8″W

WVAB was a commercial radio station licensed to serve Virginia Beach, Virginia, at 1550 AM, and serviced parts of the Hampton Roads region. The station broadcast from 1954 to 2018, ceasing operations when owner Birach Broadcasting Corporation voluntarily turned their license back to the Federal Communications Commission (FCC) for cancellation. The license surrender had followed an investigation by the commission into a decade of limited operations for it and co-owned WBVA (1450 AM).

== History ==
WVAB had a long history in Virginia Beach, moving from a popular music station to strictly news and finally gospel programming.

Sidney Kellam, a scion of political and economic power in Princess Anne County and Virginia Beach during mid-20th century, and members of the Kellam family, were the original owner and founders of WVAB. The studio and offices were long-located over the Jewish Mother Restaurant on Pacific Avenue, its headquarters for the first 34 years of its existence. WVAB had been a pop and rock music station, relying on a series of itinerant disc jockeys to purvey their various musical tastes to a limited local audience. Don Beckstrom was a constant figure on WVAB both on the air and as program director during this period.

Eventually, advertising revenues trickled to a halt at the end of the 1980s. A succession of new owners followed beginning in the early 1990s.

Since March 19, 2008, the station was off the air, following financial problems and an apparent vandalism incident of March 16. The Norfolk Virginian-Pilot newspaper reported that both WVAB—which had carried local gospel programming—and WBVA were off the air, with was no word on when or if they would return.

According to Virginia Beach police, on March 16, 2008, someone felled the stations' 200-foot (61-meter) tower. Margie Long with the Virginia Beach Police Department was quoted in local media as saying "The tower, approximately 200 ft. of it, collapsed to the ground. It appears there were numerous lines, support lines that were cut. We are investigating this as a destruction of property. There are no suspects, he said, but the investigation is ongoing." The tower stood in the 500 block of de Laura Lane, just off North Witchduck Road and north of Virginia Beach Boulevard.

WVAB was in bankruptcy and the station was sold to Birach Broadcasting Corporation on April 1, 2008, according to FCC records.

On January 22, 2018, the FCC designated WVAB and WBVA's license renewals for a hearing. According to the commission's records, WVAB operated for a total of 357 days in the two license terms between April 1, 2008, and November 30, 2017, and was silent for the remaining period of nearly nine years. When it did operate, in order to avoid automatic deletion of its license after one continuous year of silence, it was at 6 watts from a temporary transmitter site at the western edge of Virginia Beach, Virginia; the FCC estimated that WVAB covered two percent of its licensed service area from that site. Birach claimed since acquiring the stations that it had been unable to get zoning approval for a new tower. The full board of five commissioners would have determined whether renewing WVAB and WBVA's licenses would serve the public interest.

Before the FCC came to a decision, Birach attempted to donate WVAB's license and audio equipment—but not any transmission equipment or facilities—to two different nonprofits. When both donations fell through, Birach surrendered the WVAB license on September 7, 2018. The FCC cancelled the station's license on September 10, 2018.
