= KTNK =

- Lompoc, California; United States
- Broadcast area: Santa Maria—Lompoc, California
- Frequency: 1410 kHz
- Branding: Rocket 103.7

Programming
- Format: Classic hits

Ownership
- Owner: Sticks Media, LLC; (Sticks Media, LLC)

History
- First air date: May 25, 1963
- Former call signs: KKOK (1963–1977); KBIK (1977–1979); KLVV (1979–1983); KLLB (1983–1987); KTME (1987–2006); KINF (2006); KUHL (2006–2009) KSMA (2009–2014)

Technical information
- Licensing authority: FCC
- Facility ID: 51263
- Class: D
- Power: 500 watts (day); 77 watts (night)
- Transmitter coordinates: 34°39′46.9″N 120°23′1.6″W
- Translator: 103.7 K279CY (Lompoc)

Links
- Public license information: Public file; LMS

KTNK (1410 AM) is a commercial radio station that is licensed to Lompoc, California, and serves the Santa Maria—Lompoc area. The station, established in 1963, is owned by Sticks Media, LLC.

== History ==
The station first signed on May 25, 1963, as KKOK. The station underwent several call sign changes over the next two decades: first to KBIK in 1977; then, to KLVV two years later on November 8, 1979; and finally, to KLLB on August 22, 1983.

In 1985, Sunshine Wireless sold KLLB and its FM sister station KRQK (100.9 FM, now on 100.3) to Crystal Broadcasting Inc. for $1.75 million. On September 1, 1987, the AM outlet changed its call letters to KTME. On December 22, 1989, Crystal Broadcasting sold KTME and KRQK to Nova Broadcasting—Santa Maria, headed by Gregg Peterson, for $1.47 million.

The station changed hands several times in the 1990s. Nova Broadcasting sold KTME and KRQK to Padre Serra Communications for $450,000 in May 1993. In March 1995, Padre Serra traded KTME for KSBQ (1480 AM), owned by Los Padres Broadcasting Corporation. Like KTME, KSBQ was licensed to Lompoc, California and broadcast in Spanish. In November 1996, Classic Communications Corporation purchased the station for only $20,000. KTME saw a new owner just one year later as Classic sold the then-silent station to Santa Maria-based Blackhawk Communications for $80,000.

In April 2006, Mapleton Communications sold KTME and the station it was simulcasting, KUHL (1440 AM) in Santa Maria, to Knight Broadcasting Inc. KTME changed its call letters to KINF on July 31, 2006, then to KUHL that September. On January 27, 2009, the station became KSMA.

In February 2014, Knight Broadcasting sold KSMA to Michael Alan Day's Cross and Crown Broadcasting Corporation for $160,000; the transaction closed in May. At the time of the sale, KSMA broadcast a classic country format that was branded as "AM 1410 The Range". The new owner changed the station's call sign to KTNK on May 6, 2014.

In September 2023, the station relaunched as "Y'all 103.7", with the station adding a small, but noticeable, number of current and recurrent country hits to the still gold-based format. The previous iteration of the format continues on an online exclusive stream.

On February 3, 2025, KTNK dropped its country format and began stunting.

On February 10, 2025 at 9 am, KTNK ended stunting and launched a classic hits format, branded as "Rocket 103.7".
