= WPON =

- Walled Lake, Michigan; United States
- Frequency: 1460 kHz
- Branding: WPON AM 1460

Programming
- Format: Oldies

Ownership
- Owner: Birach Broadcasting

History
- First air date: December 1954
- Call sign meaning: Pontiac

Technical information
- Licensing authority: FCC
- Facility ID: 22045
- Class: B
- Power: 670 watts (day); 580 watts (night)
- Transmitter coordinates: 42°32′39″N 83°33′36″W

Links
- Public license information: Public file; LMS
- Webcast: Listen Live
- Website: wpon.com

WPON (1460 AM) is a radio station in the Detroit market, broadcasting from a six-tower array in Walled Lake, Michigan.

== History ==
WPON was founded in September 1954, with studios in Pontiac, Michigan, and towers located at the corner of Square Lake Road and Telegraph Road in neighboring Bloomfield Hills, Michigan.

The station was owned for many years by Chief Pontiac Broadcasting, broadcasting such formats as top 40 and country music. Broadcasting at 1,000 watts omnidirectionally, the station covered the majority of Oakland County.

WPON was sold to Michigan Cablevision and Radio in 1977. The company was backed by Wisconsin Cablevision and Radio and brought staff from Wisconsin for news and operations positions. Shortly after the sale, the studios were moved from the Pontiac State Bank building in Pontiac to a one-story building on Huron Street in Waterford. The station switched to country music in the wake of the Urban Cowboy movement. The station had local artists and bands performing live on-air each week, transforming its newsroom into a live music studio for the program "Hometown Country." In 1980, WPON produced an album, "Hometown Heroes", a collection of self-recorded country singles from local artists. Money from that album went to benefit the Pontiac-Oakland Symphony. One track features Marshall Crenshaw on guitar.

The station was sold in 1986 to Algis Zaparakis, who in turn sold the land containing the tower array in Bloomfield Hills to developers, and moved the tower array to a swamp near Wolverine Lake in Walled Lake, Michigan. The move forced WPON to change its power to 1,000 watts directional daytime, and 760 watts directional nighttime. This change in power saw many of WPON's listeners unable to pick up the station's signal in much of its former coverage area. The format was changed to ethnic in 1986, and stayed this way until the station was purchased in 1995 by Foreign Radio Programs, Inc. Under station manager Marie Fotion, WPON started a "Talk and Oldies" brokered radio format in 1997, specializing in hard-to-find oldies from the 1950s through the early 1970s. More recently the station also began airing pre-rock "traditional" pop/nostalgia hits from the early and mid-1950s mixed in with the rock and roll oldies.

WPON was again sold in 2003 to Birach Broadcasting Corporation, which closed the old Bloomfield Hills studios and moved operations to Birach headquarters located in the Town Center Plaza in Southfield, Michigan. WPON streams its "Talk and Rare Oldies" format live through its website.

== Shows, hosts and DJs ==
For many years, "Crazy Al" (Allyn Schmitz) hosted the morning show "Crazy Al's Radio Party" along with Larry Matthews and others. The program featured guests from the community and oldies musicians. Schmitz and his co-hosts left WPON in May 2004, shortly after the sale of the station to Birach Broadcasting Corporation.

Michael Dwyer, a freelance travel columnist in Detroit, hosted the weekly radio program "Travel and Adventure" for many years and also worked as a board operator. Dwyer, Jimmy James, and Ted Eberly were said to have left WPON in July 2004 because an agreement could not be reached between them and new owner Birach Broadcasting.

WJR veteran Bryan Styble hosted a midnight show "The Pontiac Insomniac with Bryan Styble" weeknights from October 1996 through November 1998. That overnight time slot on the weekends was filled by Anthony Torres and his "Thinking Aloud with Anthony Torres" call-in program during the same period.

WPON airs shows featuring Hindi and other Indian-language songs, including Rockin' Raaga hosted by Anu, Geetmala, and Voice of Pakistan.

Deano Day also had a long-running show on WPON.

The improv troupe Void Where Prohibited had a two-year stint on WPON with a call-in improv radio show. It was hosted by the troupe's founders Pat Caporuscio and Tommy Ventimiglio.

Aaron Gresser hosted The Double-A Revolving Door Show, which played oldies and classic rock and covered current events, sports, and entertainment. The show aired on weekdays and ended its two-year run in May 2024.

== Programming shifted to WCXI ==
In October 2010, WPON went silent so the station could make improvements to its broadcast signal. Programming was shifted to co-owned WCXI in Fenton, broadcasting from the WPON studio and still streaming from the WPON website. Birach relocated WPON and WCXI to the same broadcast facility near Wixom, Michigan, a few miles west of the old WPON site (which has been razed). Both WPON and WCXI were issued construction permits for new facilities from the new site, WCXI for 15,000 watts during the day and 1,000 watts at night, and WPON for 670 watts during the day and 175 watts at night. As of December 2019, WPON was on the air offering oldies in the morning.

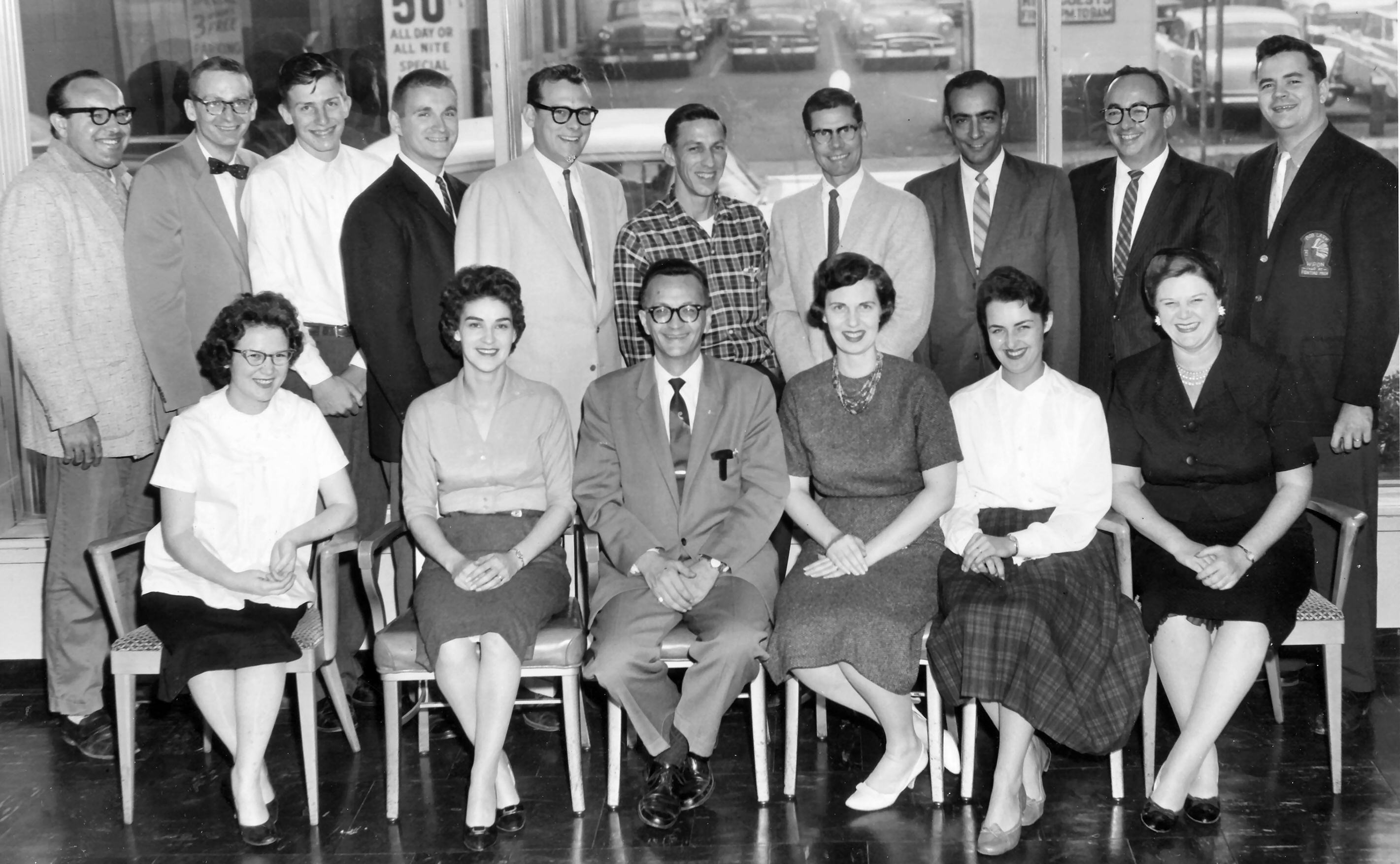
1960 WPON staff

== See also ==
- Media in Detroit
