= KYMO (AM) =

- East Prairie, Missouri; United States
- Frequency: 1080 kHz
- Branding: Shotgun Radio 97.1

Programming
- Format: Classic country

Ownership
- Owner: Delta Broadcasting, LLC

History
- First air date: 1965

Technical information
- Licensing authority: FCC
- Facility ID: 69567
- Class: D
- Power: 500 watts day
- Transmitter coordinates: 36°47′49.00″N 89°21′19.00″W
- Translator: 97.1 K246DB (Sikeston)

Links
- Public license information: Public file; LMS
- Website: shotgunradio971.com

KYMO (1080 AM) is a radio station licensed to East Prairie, Missouri, United States. The station is currently owned by Delta Broadcasting, LLC.

On April 9, 2021, KYMO changed their format from a simulcast of classic hits-formatted KYMO-FM to classic country, branded as "Shotgun Radio 97.1" (simulcast on FM translator K246DB (97.1 FM licensed to Sikeston, MO)).
