= WBVA (AM) =

Radio station in Bayside, Virginia (1999–2018)

- Bayside, Virginia; United States
- Broadcast area: Hampton Roads
- Frequency: 1450 kHz

Ownership
- Owner: Birach Broadcasting Corporation

History
- First air date: May 1999
- Last air date: September 7, 2018 (date of license surrender)
- Former call signs: WBHO (1998); WBVA (1998–2018)
- Call sign meaning: Bayside, Virginia

Technical information
- Facility ID: 84068
- Class: C
- Power: 1,000 watts
- Transmitter coordinates: 36°51′29.5″N 76°9′26.8″W

WBVA was a commercial radio station licensed to serve Bayside, Virginia, at 1450 AM, and serviced parts of the Hampton Roads region. The station broadcast from 1998 to 2018, ceasing operations when owner Birach Broadcasting Corporation voluntarily turned their license back to the Federal Communications Commission (FCC) for cancellation. The license surrender had followed an investigation by the commission into a decade of limited operations for it and co-owned WVAB (1550 AM).

== History ==
On January 22, 2018, the FCC designated WBVA and WVAB's license renewals for a hearing. According to the commission's records, WBVA operated for a total of 120 days in the two license terms between April 1, 2008, and November 30, 2017, and was silent for the remaining period of over nine years. When WBVA did operate, in order to avoid automatic deletion of its license after one continuous year of silence, it was at 30 watts from a temporary transmitter site at the western edge of Virginia Beach, Virginia. The FCC estimated that WBVA covered ten percent of its licensed service area from that site.

Since Birach Broadcasting acquired the stations in 2008 after their tower was destroyed, it has continually claimed that it has been unable to get zoning approval for a new tower for both stations. The full board of five commissioners would have determined whether renewing WBVA and WVAB's licenses would serve the public interest.

Before the FCC came to a decision, Birach attempted to donate WBVA's license and audio equipment – but not any transmission equipment or facilities – to two different nonprofits. When both donations fell through, Birach surrendered the WBVA license on September 7, 2018. The FCC cancelled the station's license on September 10, 2018.
