= KGVY =

- Green Valley, Arizona; United States
- Broadcast area: Tucson metropolitan area
- Frequency: 1080 kHz
- Branding: KGVY 1080 AM and 101.5 FM

Programming
- Format: Oldies
- Affiliations: ABC News Radio; United Stations Radio Networks; Westwood One

Ownership
- Owner: KGVY LLC

History
- First air date: September 23, 1981
- Call sign meaning: Green Valley

Technical information
- Licensing authority: FCC
- Facility ID: 14662
- Class: D
- Power: 1,000 watts (day)
- Transmitter coordinates: 31°55′46″N 110°59′50″W
- Translator: 101.5 K268DC (Green Valley)

Links
- Public license information: Public file; LMS
- Webcast: Listen live
- Website: kgvy1080.com

KGVY (1080 AM) is a commercial radio station licensed to Green Valley, Arizona, United States, and serving the Tucson metropolitan area with an oldies format. It is owned by KGVY LLC.

KGVY is a daytimer AM station; it is powered at 1,000 watts non-directional from its transmitter on West Camino Antigua in Sahuarita, Arizona. Programming is heard around the clock on 250-watt FM translator K268DC at 101.5 MHz.

== Programming ==
KGVY plays hits from the 1960s, 70s and 80s. Syndicated programming includes "Goddard's Gold" from United Stations Radio Networks and "Beatle Brunch" from Westwood One. KGVY sponsors multiple business events throughout the year including the "Home and Living Show" and "Senior Information Fair." KGVY also publishes "The KGVY Quarterly" and "The White Elephant" guide as the official paper for the White Elephant Community Foundation.

== History ==
The station signed on the air on September 23, 1981.
