= Birach Broadcasting Corporation =

American radio station company

Birach Broadcasting Corporation is a company based in Southfield, Michigan, United States, that owns several AM radio stations and, formerly, one low-power television (LPTV) station in the US. Many stations in the Birach portfolio run ethnic broadcasting. The company was wholly owned by its president and CEO Sima Birach, who died October 14, 2025.

== Stations owned ==
=== Radio stations ===
Callsign	Frequency	Band	City	State	Format
WWCS	540	AM	Canonsburg	PA	Brokered (Overcomer Ministry)
WMFN	640	AM	Peotone	IL	Gospel music
WNZK (Note: WNZK broadcasts on 690 kHz during the daytime and on 680 kHz during the nighttime; it is the only mediumwave radio station in North America licensed to operate on two different frequencies with the same license, a privilege otherwise only granted to shortwave stations.)	690	AM	Dearborn Heights	MI	Ethnic, talk
WNZK	680	AM	Dearborn Heights	MI	Ethnic, talk
WDMV	700	AM	Walkersville	MD	Spanish
WEW	770	AM	St. Louis	MO	Brokered (Overcomer Ministry)
WTOR	770	AM	Youngstown	NY	Ethnic (Note: Operated by Radio Saaz-o-Awaz in Toronto, Ontario, Canada, under a local marketing agreement. Birach holds the WTOR license due to regulations forbidding foreign ownership of stations.)
WIJR	880	AM	Highland	IL	Regional Mexican
WNWI	1080	AM	Oak Lawn	IL	Ethnic
WCAR	1090	AM	Livonia	MI	Oldies
WCXI	1160	AM	Fenton	MI	Classic hits
WCXN	1170	AM	Claremont	NC	Brokered (Overcomer Ministry)
KJMU	1340	AM	Sand Springs	OK	Spanish
KOLE	1340	AM	Port Arthur	TX	Brokered (Overcomer Ministry)
WBRD	1420	AM	Palmetto	FL	Brokered (Overcomer Ministry)
WBVA	1450	AM	Bayside	VA	Defunct, license deleted by FCC
WPON	1460	AM	Walled Lake	MI	Oldies
KXLQ	1490	AM	Indianola	IA	Regional Mexican
WVAB	1550	AM	Virginia Beach	VA	Defunct, license deleted by FCC

=== Television station ===
Station	Channel	Community of license	Network	Notes
KIJR-LP	47	Lucerne Valley, California		Defunct; license cancelled July 8, 2022
