= WIJR =

Coordinates: 38°45′23″N 89°39′18″W

- Highland, Illinois; United States
- Broadcast area: St. Louis, Missouri
- Frequency: 880 kHz
- Branding: La Tremenda 880 AM

Programming
- Format: Regional Mexican

Ownership
- Owner: Birach Broadcasting Corporation

Technical information
- Licensing authority: FCC
- Facility ID: 72890
- Class: B
- Power: 1,700 watts day 160 watts night

Links
- Public license information: Public file; LMS
- Website: www.latremenda880.com

WIJR (880 AM) is a radio station broadcasting a Regional Mexican format. Licensed to Highland, Illinois, United States, it serves the St. Louis, Missouri area. The station is currently owned by Birach Broadcasting Corporation.

WIJR's studios are located on Hampton Avenue in St. Louis, while its transmitter is located near Highland. They use a directional signal, aimed towards St. Louis, due to avoid interference from WHSQ in New York City, further north into New York.

== History ==
WIJR was previously WINU until February 6, 2001, when it changed callsigns to WCBW. WCBW was changed to WIJR on August 15, 2006.
