= KSLU (Saint Louis University) =

Student media organization in Missouri, US

KSLU is a student media organization at Saint Louis University (SLU) in St. Louis, Missouri. The organization, which is affiliated with the College of Arts & Sciences' Department of Communication, provides "Saint Louis University and the St. Louis community with a student-run, tangible media outlet; providing new music, talk radio, written publication, as well as other student needs". Its studios and offices are located in the university's Busch Student Center building.

KSLU traces its founding to the establishment of a carrier current radio station, that was set up at the university in 1949. As technologies for distributing audio programming have evolved, KSLU has employed, in turn, AM and FM radio broadcasting, transmission over cable TV channels, and, most recently, streaming audio and podcasts available over the internet.

== Early history (KBIL) ==
Saint Louis University was a prominent pioneer in early radio development. The university began experimentation with spark transmitters in 1912, transmitted daily weather reports over station 9YK beginning on April 26, 1921, received a license for one of the first AM broadcasting stations in the United States, WEW, in March 1922, and began operating one of the earliest FM stations, WEW-FM, in 1947. However, the FM station was shut down in late 1949, and, in the mid-1950s, WEW, which was a faculty-run, religious station, was sold to a commercial operator.

Meanwhile, in 1949 the SLU communications department established a student-run carrier current radio station, operating on the AM band. Information on the frequency used is scarce, but in 1970 the station was transmitting on 600 kilohertz. Its description in the 1955 Saint Louis University Yearbook stated that the three main purposes of the station were to "provide a practical training ground for those who are training themselves for the radio profession", act as "an interesting and valuable extra-curricular activity", and provide "entertainment particularly designed to satisfy its student audience". Because its signal was very low power, providing service only to the university campus and immediately adjoining areas, the station did not need a Federal Communications Commission (FCC) license in order to operate. In addition, as an unlicensed station, it was never assigned official call letters by the FCC. However, for identification purposes, the moniker "KBIL"—referring to the school's "Billiken" mascot—was adopted for use on the air.

Although KBIL rarely received attention beyond of the confines of the SLU campus, it did briefly gain national attention in February 1955, when Dave Lukefahr and Joseph Kessler played a Betty Clooney record, "So All Alone", 1,323 times over a 60-hour period, surpassing by one hour the old mark for repetitive airplay.

== Evolution (KSLU) ==
In 1983, a recently established FM station in San Angelo, Texas, that had been officially assigned KBIL (now KDCD) as its call letters by the FCC, complained about the duplicate use of its callsign by the SLU operation. As a result, the SLU station moniker was changed from "KBIL" to the still-used "KSLU".

KSLU's AM band carrier current transmitter was eventually taken out of service, and a low-power FM transmitter operated until the mid -1990s. Its programming was later made available as background audio over cable TV channel 12, followed by the establishment of online streaming.

Between 1992 and 1998 KSLU expanded its activities, publishing Fiber, a college music magazine, and hosting concerts at the Reinert Pub, a student tavern on the ground floor of Reinert Hall. An attempt in 2000 to return to the airwaves as a low-power FM station was unsuccessful, however, the development of internet streaming means that over-the-air broadcasting is no longer needed for it to reach its audience. KSLU added a Sports department in 2007, with sports talk shows and live broadcasts of SLU Billikens sporting events.

== Today ==
KSLU currently broadcasts 24 hours a day, over cable channel 18 on the SLU campus and online. In addition, it offers a mobile disc-jockey service for on-campus events, publishes Already Bored (a successor of Fiber and The Amp), and organizes music events.
