= WOKT =

- Cannonsburg, Kentucky; United States
- Broadcast area: Huntington, West Virginia
- Frequency: 1080 kHz
- Branding: Your 24 Hour Christian Talk & Information Station

Programming
- Format: Christian Talk

Ownership
- Owner: Baker Family Stations; (Big River Radio, Inc.)
- Sister stations: www.wonswjeh.com

History
- Former call signs: WKOG (3/85-5/85); WKOT (1985–1986); WOKT (1986–2009); WYHY (2009–2015); WONS (2015–2018)

Technical information
- Licensing authority: FCC
- Facility ID: 73185
- Class: D
- Power: 1,800 watts (day)
- Transmitter coordinates: 38°23′10″N 82°41′53″W
- Translator: (106.7 MHz) W294CP (Huntington)

Links
- Public license information: Public file; LMS

WOKT (1080 AM) is a radio station licensed to serve Cannonsburg, Kentucky, United States. The station is owned by Baker Family Stations, through licensee Big River Radio, Inc.

It broadcasts a Christian Talk & Teaching format with several National Bible Teachers and Local Church ministries to the greater Huntington, West Virginia, area.

The station was assigned the WYHY call letters by the Federal Communications Commission on February 6, 2009. It changed its call sign to WONS on January 23, 2015, and to the current WOKT on April 3, 2018.
