= WCAR (AM) =

- Livonia, Michigan; United States
- Broadcast area: Metro Detroit
- Frequency: 1090 kHz
- Branding: Detroit's Cars 1090

Programming
- Format: Oldies

Ownership
- Owner: Sima Birach; (Birach Broadcasting Corporation)

History
- First air date: May 23, 1961
- Former call signs: WERB (1961–1966); WTAK (1966–1970); WIID (1970-1979)
- Call sign meaning: A reference to Detroit's automotive industry

Technical information
- Licensing authority: FCC
- Facility ID: 73397
- Class: B
- Power: 250 watts (day); 500 watts (night)
- Transmitter coordinates: 42°19′46.1″N 83°21′42.8″W

Links
- Public license information: Public file; LMS
- Webcast: Listen live
- Website: www.birach.com/wcar

WCAR (1090 AM) is a commercial radio station licensed to Livonia, Michigan, and serving the Metro Detroit radio market. It airs an oldies format operated by Revolving Door Media LLC and is owned by Birach Broadcasting Corporation.

Because AM 1090 is a clear channel frequency reserved for Class A stations WBAL in Baltimore, and XEPRS in Tijuana, Mexico, WCAR must broadcast with a directional antenna to avoid interference. By day, it transmits 250 watts and at night its power increases to 500 watts.

== History ==
=== Early years ===
On May 23, 1961, the station first sign-on as WERB in Garden City, Michigan. It was co-owned with the now-defunct WBRB in Mount Clemens and aired a full service/middle of the road format aimed at the western suburbs of Wayne County. The original owner was Milton Maltz, the founder of the Malrite Communications Group. WERB started as a daytimer, required to go off the air at sunset to avoid interfering with other stations on AM 1090. In the 1964-1965 time frame, Gil Wuttke was the WERB radio station chief engineer and late afternoon/evening DJ, playing easy listening music.

Around 1966, WERB became WTAK, still under Malrite's ownership. WTAK was notable for being the Detroit area's first all-talk radio station. (The WTAK call sign referred to "talk".) The air staff included such Detroit radio notables as Tom Clay, Vic Caputo, and Paul Winter.

Following a sale to Wolpin Broadcasting in 1969, WTAK changed to WIID ("wide") in January 1970 and went back to a suburban-oriented MOR format. By late 1973, polka musician Big Don Martin was serving as WIID's program director, with much Polish (and other ethnic) music airing on the station. For years afterward, the bulk of AM 1090's programming (as WIID and, starting in 1979, WCAR) consisted of paid brokered programming, in foreign languages and some English-language talk.

=== Children's radio ===
On July 29, 1996, WCAR became the Detroit network affiliate station for Radio AAHS, a nationwide radio network featuring programming for children. Then, after Radio AAHS shut down on January 30, 1998, it aired the Minneapolis-based dance music format "Beat Radio" which replaced AAHS overnights on all ten of the company-owned former AAHS stations around the country.

In the late 1990s, much of WCAR's programming had been simulcast on sister station WOAP in Owosso, focused on the Lansing radio market. The two stations aired ethnic brokered programming, along with religious content from Michigan Catholic Radio. (WOAP now airs an adult hits format.)

=== Talk format ===
In May 2009, WCAR and WOAP were sold to Birach Broadcasting. Michigan Catholic Radio ended its broadcasts on WCAR on July 31, 2009, when Birach took over the station. Beginning in 2009, the station aired a syndicated talk format with Imus in the Morning, Brian Kilmeade, Robert Wuhl, Jim Bohannon and Red Eye Radio, using newscasts from CNN, Fox News Radio and MarketWatch.

A new afternoon drive time show featuring local legendary broadcasters Bill Bonds and Rich Fisher (Bonds & Fisher) debuted on October 3, 2011. The show was cancelled in late December 2011. The station considered retooling the talk format, but management decided to go in a different direction.

=== All sports ===
On February 1, 2012, WCAR switched from a talk format to all-sports, featuring ESPN Radio programming. The change was mentioned by Mike Tirico during the Illinois-Michigan State basketball game on January 31, 2012, on ESPN. The flip signified the return of ESPN Radio to the Detroit market for the first time since 2007.

WCAR began locally produced sports talk programming in April 2012 with a one-hour Detroit Red Wings playoff show. That expanded into a daily afternoon drive time program with more local shows being added until the station was running local programming from 1 p.m. to 10 p.m. on most weekdays. The locally produced programming abruptly ended on May 3, 2013, and WCAR switched over to an entirely-syndicated schedule.

At 10 p.m. on July 12, 2013, ESPN Radio pulled its programming off WCAR, with the ESPN affiliation going to WMGC-FM as that station switched to a sports format. WCAR picked up NBC Sports Radio in its place.

WCAR directly competed with WXYT, WXYT-FM, and WDFN as the four sports stations in Detroit. WMGC-FM was a competitor until June 2016, when it dropped the format due to low ratings. On May 9, 2014, WCAR announced it was switching from NBC Sports Radio to Yahoo! Sports Radio, effective May 12. Yahoo! was renamed "SB Nation Radio" in 2016.

On May 7, 2018, the format flipped again, this time to hip hop and R&B music, as "The Switch". This format was short-lived, as WCAR returned to all-sports in early June 2018, again carrying SB Nation Radio. The station affiliated with Fox Sports Radio in November 2020.

When the Fox Sports Radio programming ceased, WCAR began simulcasting "La Explosiva", a Spanish-language format from Vasquez Broadcasting originating from their flagship station, 1480 WSDS. Since WSDS isn't strong in downtown Detroit and the surrounding suburbs, simulcasting on WCAR gave them extra reach into the market.

On September 3, 2026, following a new transmitter installation, WCAR flipped to "Detroit's Cars 1090", an oldies format operated by Revolving Door Media LLC.

== See also ==
- Media in Detroit
