= Bayside, Virginia Beach =

Borough in the U.S. state of Virginia

Bayside
- borough
- Location within the Commonwealth of Virginia Bayside (the United States)
- Coordinates: 36°54′11″N 76°8′4″W
- Country: United States
- State: Virginia
- Independent city: Virginia Beach
- Time zone: UTC−5 (Eastern (EST))
  - Summer (DST): UTC−4 (EDT)

Bayside is one of the seven original boroughs created with the city of Virginia Beach, Virginia and was formed in 1963. Bayside lies in northern Virginia Beach in the vicinity of the intersection of U.S. Route 13 and U.S. Route 60. To the west of Bayside is the Naval Amphibious Base Little Creek.

== City government ==
Bayside is represented by City Council Member Delceno Miles.
