= Brother Stair =

Christian fundamentalist (1933–2021)

- Born: Ralph Gordon Stair; May 3, 1933; Bethlehem, Pennsylvania, US
- Died: April 3, 2021 (aged 87); Canadys, South Carolina, US
- Other names: Brother R.G. Stair; Brother Stair
- Occupation: Radio evangelist
- Employers: Faith Cathedral Fellowship, Inc.; Overcomer Ministry
- Website: overcomerministry.org

Ralph Gordon Stair (May 3, 1933 – April 3, 2021), also known as Brother R. G. Stair, or simply known as Brother Stair, was an American minister and evangelist. He broadcast his preaching on digital and shortwave radio. In the 1990s, at the peak of his radio ministry, Stair was heard on 120 stations.

Stair founded the Overcomer Ministry in 1978, declaring that he was a prophet. He lived in a community with his followers at a compound in Walterboro, South Carolina. Over the years, Stair was involved in a number of controversies, including convictions for sexual abuse, allegations that he caused infant deaths, and allegations that his ministry is a cult.

== Early life ==
Stair was born in Bethlehem, Pennsylvania. He was ordained as a Methodist minister, but later, he left organized religion, stating "I just call myself a Christian." He moved to the Southern United States in the 1950s, stating that God told him to move there because it would be "the safest place for Christians in the end time."

== Overcomer Ministry ==
Stair led the Overcomer Ministry, officially incorporated as the Faith Cathedral Fellowship, a conservative Pentecostal Christian organization which runs a widely heard radio-based ministry. Stair purchased a motel in Walterboro, South Carolina in 1978, and encouraged followers to move to the community, sell all their possessions, take a vow of poverty, and donate all that they owned to Overcomer Ministry.

The community of about 70 strives for self-sufficiency and simplicity, growing their own food and making their own clothes. Community members live in mobile homes and handmade houses, eating communal meals and gathering for Saturday worship in the Tabernacle. They dress conservatively. Women wear long skirts and men wear long pants and shirts with collars. Typically, work is divided along traditional gender lines, with men performing farm/manual labor and women doing domestic chores. Members primarily rely on bicycles for transportation within the community.

Stair objected to medical intervention, and he advocated the avoidance of doctors. Commune members typically followed Stair's teaching, and in the 1980s and 1990s, local authorities conducted investigations after three infants died at the community either during or shortly after birth.

Evangelism was the primary focus of Stair's ministry. He broadcast from a solar-powered radio studio which is based in the community, often for hours at a time. As of 2014, Stair leased airtime globally on five free-to-air satellites (Galaxy 19, Hot Bird 8, Optus D2, Thaicom 5, and Eutelsat 25B) and on seven international shortwave radio stations (WHRI, WWRB, WTWW, WWCR, WBCQ, WRMI, and Media Broadcast GmbH) to convey his message to listeners in the United States as well as listeners in locations as far-flung as South America, Africa, Australia, New Zealand, Europe, Israel, Russia, and India.

In addition to broadcasting worldwide via international satellite and shortwave, Stair broadcast worldwide via internet streaming from his ministry's web site. He also leased time on terrestrial AM and FM radio stations throughout the United States, some of which are large-coverage stations. In the 1990s, Brother Stair was heard on 120 such stations, though by 2007 and continuing through 2014, that total had been reduced to approximately 25.

In 2016, however, the broadcast was dramatically increased due to a large contribution which allowed Brother Stair to purchase hundreds of hours of broadcasting time per day and produce one of the most extensive shortwave broadcasts in history. Broadcast expenditures of about $1.5 million are funded by donations from listeners. In 1993 and 1994, Stair and his ministry were partners in a failed ship-based radio project due to authorities raiding and confiscating both the ship and its equipment before it could set sail to international waters.

Stair's teachings place a strong emphasis on millennial predictions of world-changing events which will result from divine judgment. In the year 1999, he said that there would be such changes at the dawn of the third millennium. "If the Lord God Almighty does not make a major move before the year 2000," he said, "I'll tell God to go to Hell." Stair also has received publicity over the years for several of his prophecies, including a nuclear confrontation prophesied for 1988, and that Ronald Reagan would not complete his term as president.

== Criminal cases ==
While he was hosting a revival in Muskogee, Oklahoma, Stair was arrested in late December 1963 on charges of outraging public decency, including using obscene language and performing obscene actions in front of a minor.

Stair, then aged 69, was arrested in Walterboro on May 16, 2002, on two counts of criminal sexual conduct in the second degree; two women who were associated with Brother Stair, ages 17 and 20, alleged that he coerced them by "enforcing his religious/personal beliefs" on them. In 2004, Stair pleaded guilty to the charge of assault and battery and was sentenced to time served, a total of 77 days in custody.

During his incarceration, recorded programs continued to be broadcast. Stair's conviction caused division in the community. However, about 70 residents remained loyal to him and there are two small branch communities which are part of his ministry.

On December 18, 2017, Stair was arrested on eight counts, which included three counts of first-degree criminal sexual conduct and single counts of assault with the intent to commit criminal sexual conduct, kidnapping, second-degree assault, first-degree burglary, and third-degree criminal sexual conduct with a minor. Stair came to the attention of authorities because of YouTube videos showing him touching a 12-year-old girl's breast during service and then saying, "I'm gonna touch them things till nobody else can touch them."

Another video showed a 16-year-old girl accusing him of sexually assaulting her over a five-month period. Four women described assaults including groping and rape. Stair reportedly told the women that the acts were "God's will". He was released on a $750,000 bond a month later on condition he not leave the property and was electronically monitored. Stair later admitted to the touching allegations during production of a documentary about Craig Mack, a musician who joined Stair's commune in 2011 and died in 2018.

On January 1, 2018, the Overcomer Ministry ceased broadcasting its show on radio stations as a result of what it called 'legal difficulties'. Currently, the Overcomer Ministry continues to stream its show on its website, and it also continues to broadcast its show on satellite radio stations. As of November 2020, the station can also be heard on the 7.49 MHz shortwave station WBCQ. In June 2025, Overcomer announced plans to end its radio broadcasting agreements, stating that it no longer had the donations coming in to support its massive airtime purchases (WRMI noted that the ministry was buying hundreds of hours of airtime per day at the time of the discontinuation).

== Death ==
Stair died of heart failure at the age of 87 on April 3, 2021, at his home in Canadys, South Carolina.
