= WEBS (AM) =

Radio station in Calhoun, Georgia

- Calhoun, Georgia; United States
- Broadcast area: Gordon County; Northwest Georgia
- Frequency: 1030 kHz
- Branding: The Fox 103.5

Programming
- Format: Adult contemporary

Ownership
- Owner: James R. Powell

History
- First air date: November 1, 1966
- Call sign meaning: William, Emma Jo, Bruce and Sandy Stocks (original owners)

Technical information
- Licensing authority: FCC
- Facility ID: 54881
- Class: D
- Power: 5,000 watts day 3 watts night
- Transmitter coordinates: 34°29′25.00″N 84°55′4.00″W
- Translator: 103.5 W278CD (Calhoun)

Links
- Public license information: Public file; LMS
- Website: thefox1035.com

WEBS (1030 kHz) is an American commercial AM radio station licensed to serve the community of Calhoun, Georgia; the station serves the Gordon County, Georgia area. The station broadcasts an adult contemporary radio format.

== History ==
Former logo

WEBS-AM began broadcasting on November 1, 1966 at 1110 kHz. It was begun by the Stocks family—William, Emma Jo, Bruce and Sandy—from whose names the station's call sign originated. In 1980, WEBS was purchased by Kenyon D. Payne, formerly of Rome. Ken grew up with a microphone in his hand because his father, Mather Payne, was owner and operator of WRGA. Randy Rhodes, owner of WJRP-LP "Power 107.7" in Calhoun, was also involved in station management; WJRP-LP also broadcasts from the same studios on South Wall Street in downtown Calhoun. Dwayne Jackson served as the station's News/Traffic/Programming/Social Media Director, as well as Executive Producer.

Previous logo

In 2002, WEBS moved to 1030 kHz, bringing with it a substantial power increase during the day from 250 to 5,000 watts. After some time with a country music format, the station later switched to pop and classic hits. In 2016, the station changed back to country as "Kickin' 103.5", branding previously used when WEBS owned WIPK. That newly built station went on the air in 2011 but was sold in 2015 to the operator of a co-channel FM translator in Atlanta, which it now simulcasts.

In addition to its country music programming, WEBS aired gospel music and religious programs on Sundays along with local news and high school sports programming. The station was also an affiliate of the Georgia Tech IMG Sports Network.

On August 16, 2019, it was announced that WEBS had been foreclosed on by a bank and would go silent on August 18 at 6 p.m. WIPK picked up local high school football coverage from WEBS. The station's license was assigned to James R. Powell effective November 30, 2021. It soon adopted an adult contemporary format under the branding "The Fox 103.5".
