= WBIE =

WBIE may refer to:

- WBIE (FM), a radio station (91.5 MHz) in Delphos, Ohio
- WKHX-FM, a radio station (101.5 FM) in Flower Mound, Texas, which held the call sign WBIE-FM from 1959 to 1974 and WBIE from 1974 to 1981
- WFTD, a radio station (1080 AM) in Marietta, Georgia, which held the call sign WBIE from 1955 to 1974
- Warner Bros. Interactive Entertainment
