= WFDR =

WFDR may refer to:

- WFDR-FM, a radio station (94.5 FM) licensed to Woodbury, Georgia, United States
- WFDR (AM), a radio station (1370 AM) licensed to Manchester, Georgia, United States
- WVFJ-FM, a radio station (93.3 FM) also licensed to Manchester, and which was WFDR-FM from 1978 to 1981
- WAXQ, a radio station (104.3 FM) licensed to New York City, and which was WFDR-FM from 1949 to 1952
- WFDR, a fictitious television station which employs the cartoon duck, Mallard Fillmore
