= WPBS =

WPBS may refer to:

- WPBS-TV, a television station (channel 26, virtual channel 16) licensed to serve Watertown, New York, United States
- WPBS (AM), a radio station (1040 AM) licensed to serve Conyers, Georgia, United States
- WUSL, a radio station (98.9 FM) licensed to serve Philadelphia, Pennsylvania, United States, formerly known as WPBS-FM
