= Calhoun High School (Georgia) =

Public high school in Calhoun, Georgia, United States

Coordinates: 34.49904°N 84.95500°W

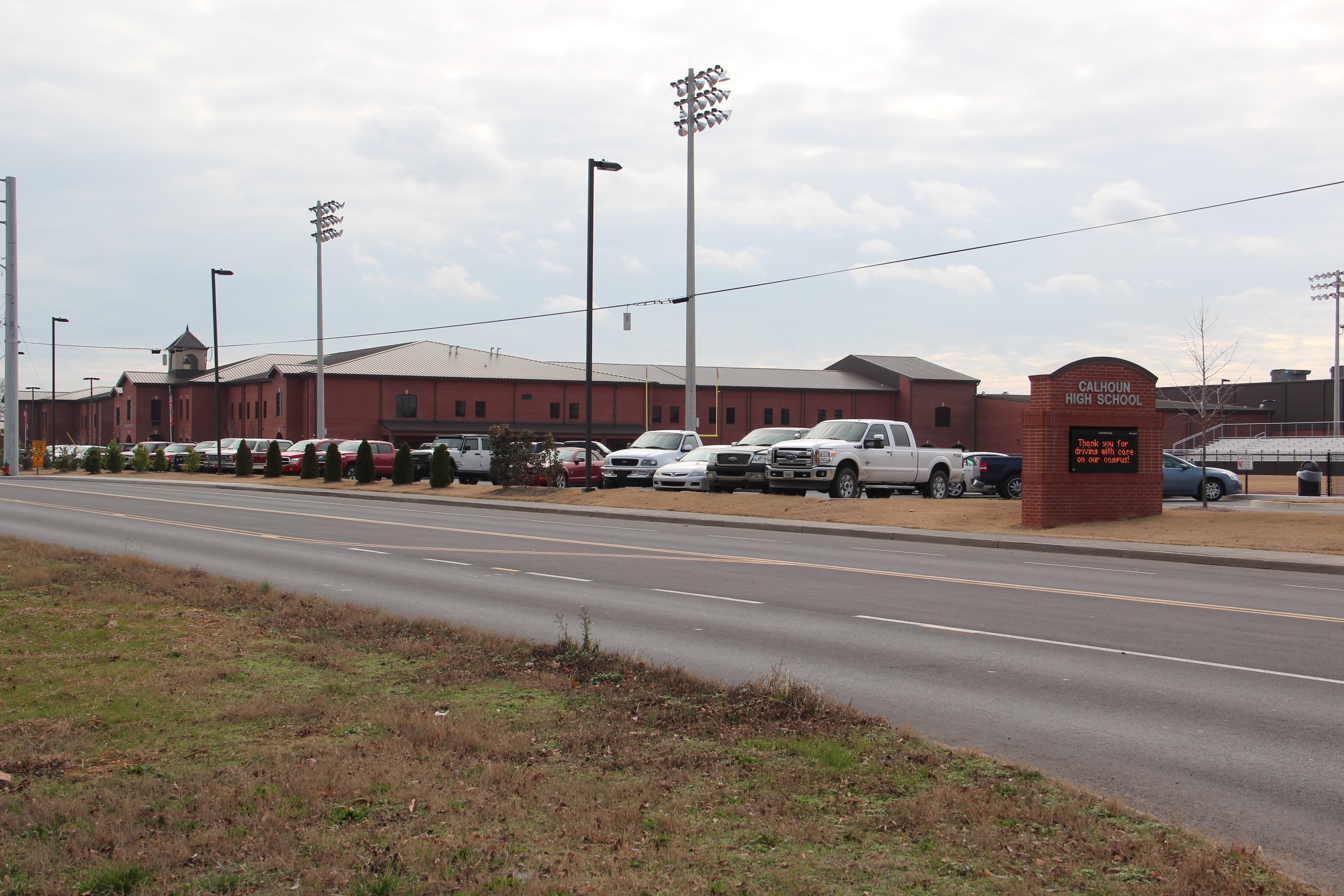

Location
- 355 S. River Street; Calhoun, Georgia 30701-2379; United States

Information
- Type: Public
- Established: 1902
- Status: Open
- Locale: Town, Distant
- School district: Calhoun City School District
- Superintendent: Michele Taylor
- Principal: Allison Eubanks
- Staff: 71.60 (FTE)
- Grades: 9–12
- Enrollment: 1,224 (2025-26)
- Student to teacher ratio: 18.17
- Colours: Gold, Black. White
- Fight song: Washington and Lee Swing
- Athletics: Varsity and junior varsity
- Athletics conference: 7 - AAA (3A)
- Sports: Basketball, baseball, cheerleading, cross country, football, golf, soccer, softball, swim team, tennis, track, volleyball, and wrestling
- Mascot: Yellow Jacket
- Team name: Yellow Jackets
- Website: www.calhounschools.org

Calhoun High School is a public high school in Calhoun, Georgia, United States, serving grades 9–12 for the Calhoun City School District. It is accredited by the Georgia Accrediting Commission and the Southern Association of Colleges and Schools, and is a member of Georgia High School Association. It is located near downtown Calhoun in Gordon County.

== Awards ==
Calhoun was named a Silver Medal school in the "Best High Schools" category by U.S. News & World Report in 2009.

The Calhoun debate team won the 2008-2009 state debate championship (AA). The Calhoun teams combined for a 9–3 record against other finalists from single-A through triple-A schools, which gave them the AA division title.

== Athletics ==
Calhoun offers basketball, baseball, competition cheerleading, cross country, football, golf, soccer, softball, swim team, tennis, track, wrestling, and volleyball. Several teams, including softball, baseball, golf, football, track, and cheerleading, have won state championships. As of the 2024-2026 regional alignments by GHSA, Calhoun High School is in Georgia Region 7-AAA. The team mascot (the Yellow Jacket) was chosen due to the school's proximity to the Georgia Institute of Technology. Each year Calhoun pays royalties of 1 US dollar to Georgia Tech for the use of the mascot and its likeness. Calhoun calls its mascot "Stinger" rather than "Buzz".

Overall, Calhoun has won 25 state championships in school history, in six different sports.

Football

Calhoun football home games are played at Phil Reeve Stadium on the school campus near downtown. The stadium is named for C.P. "Phil" Reeve, the guitar player and founding member of the Georgia Yellow Hammers, an early 20th-century "old-time" band from Gordon County. The Jackets won their first football state title since the 1952 season in 2011 with a 27–24 overtime victory against Buford. The Yellow Jackets won 19 straight region titles (2001–2018) and made the Georgia State Football Playoffs every year from the 2000 season until the 2023 season. In 2024, Calhoun won their fifth state title, defeating Jefferson 20–7, just one year after missing the playoffs.

- State championships - 1952 (class C), 2011 (AA), 2014 (AAA), 2017 (AAA), 2024 (AAA).
- Region titles - 1950, 1951, 1995, 2001, 2002, 2003, 2004, 2005, 2006, 2007, 2008, 2009, 2010, 2011, 2012, 2013,2014, 2015, 2016, 2017, 2018, 2022, 2024, 2025.

Baseball

The baseball team has won four state titles (1974, 2000, 2005, 2010).

- State championships - 1974 (A), 2000 (A), 2005 (AA), and 2010 (AA)
- Region titles -1968, 1973, 1974, 1996, 1997, 2001, 2005, 2007, 2008, 2009, 2010, 2012, 2014, and 2026

Boys' basketball

The Jackets boys' basketball team has won 15 region titles in 1969, 1975, 1978, 1996, 2000, 2002, 2013, 2014, 2015, 2016, 2017, 2018, 2021, 2025, and 2026. The team were state runners-up in 2001 and 2014.

Girls' basketball

The Lady Jackets basketball team has won five region titles in 2000, 2011, 2013, 2015, and 2023.

Girls' softball

The Lady Jackets softball team has won four state championships, 2013 (AA), 2014 (AAA), 2015 (AAA), and 2017 (AAA). The Lady Jackets were State Runner-Ups in 1998, 2008, and 2016. The Lady Jackets have won region titles in 1987, 1995, 1998, 1999, 2000, 2007, 2008, 2012, 2013, 2014, 2015, 2016, 2018, and 2020.

Cheerleading

Calhoun High School Competition Cheerleaders won state championships in 2006, 2007, 2009, 2010, 2013, and 2014, while receiving state runner-up honors in 2004, 2008, 2012, and 2018.

Boys' golf

The boys golf team won a state championship in 1997.

- Region titles - 1991, 1995, 1996, 1997, 2000, 2001, 2005, 2006, 2009, 2010, 2014, 2015, and 2023

Girls' golf

The Lady Jackets golf team has won four state championships in golf in 2015, 2016, 2017, and 2026.

== Notable alumni ==
- Davis Allen, NFL tight end for the Los Angeles Rams
- Charlie Culberson, former Major League Baseball player and 2015 inductee into the Calhoun-Gordon County Sports Hall of Fame
- Kris Durham, former NFL player
- Adam Griffith, former Alabama Crimson Tide placekicker
- Riley Gunnels, former NFL player
- McCartney Kessler, tennis player
- Taylor Lamb, former college football quarterback and quarterbacks coach for the Virginia Cavaliers
- Tre Lamb, head football coach for the Tulsa Golden Hurricane
- James Beverly Langford, Georgia state legislator
- Darwin Lom, professional footballer who plays as a forward for FBF División Profesional club The Strongest and the Guatemala national team
- Monty Powell, country songwriter, producer for Alabama, Diamond Rio, Tim McGraw, and Keith Urban
- Da'Rick Rogers, former NFL player
- Josh Smoker, former MLB pitcher
- Baylon Spector, NFL linebacker
- Emaree Winston, college football tight end for the Texas Longhorns
- Cody Worley, head football coach for the Furman Paladins

== Gallery ==
Phil Reeve Stadium on campus

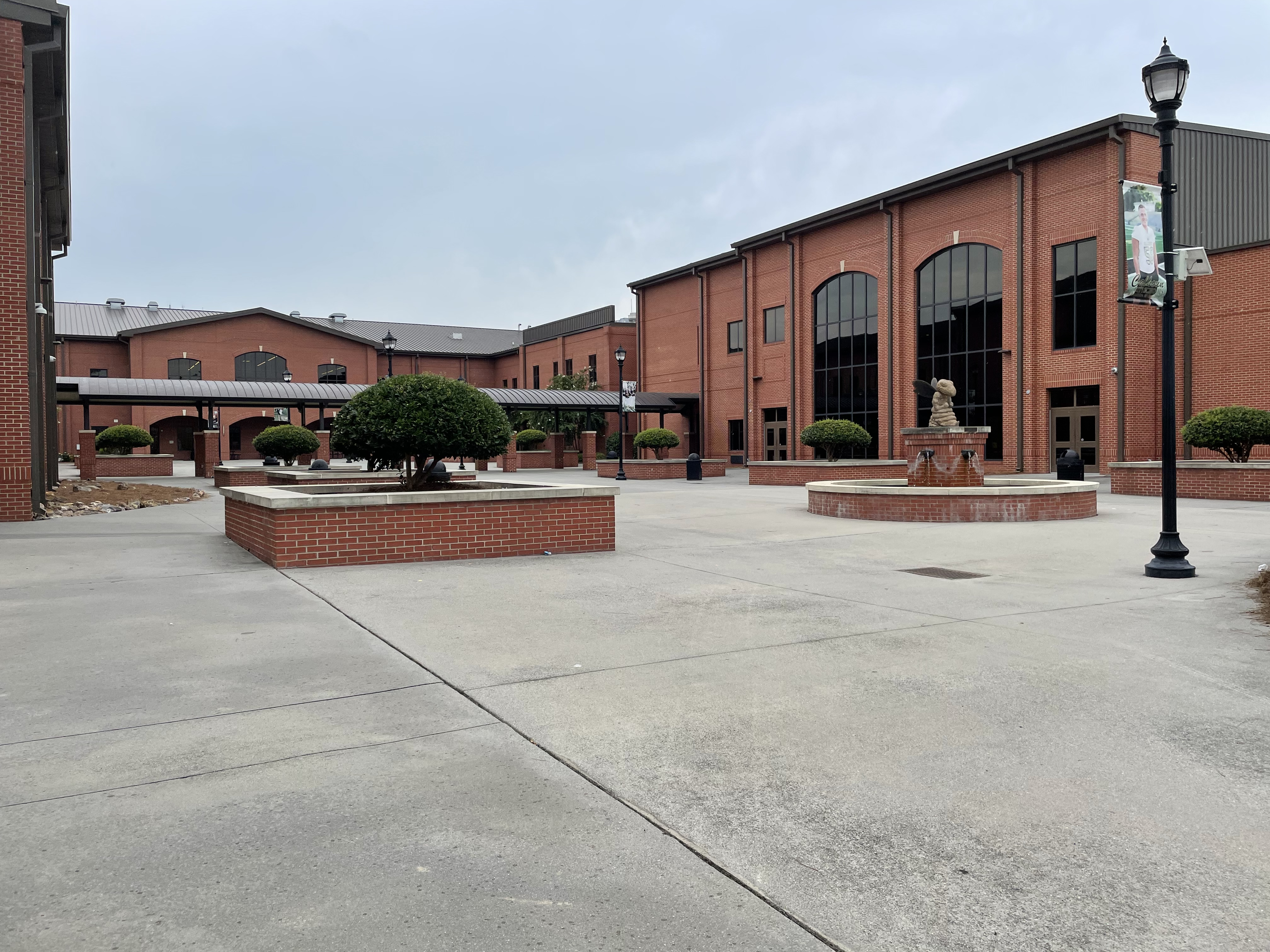
The Courtyard at Calhoun High School

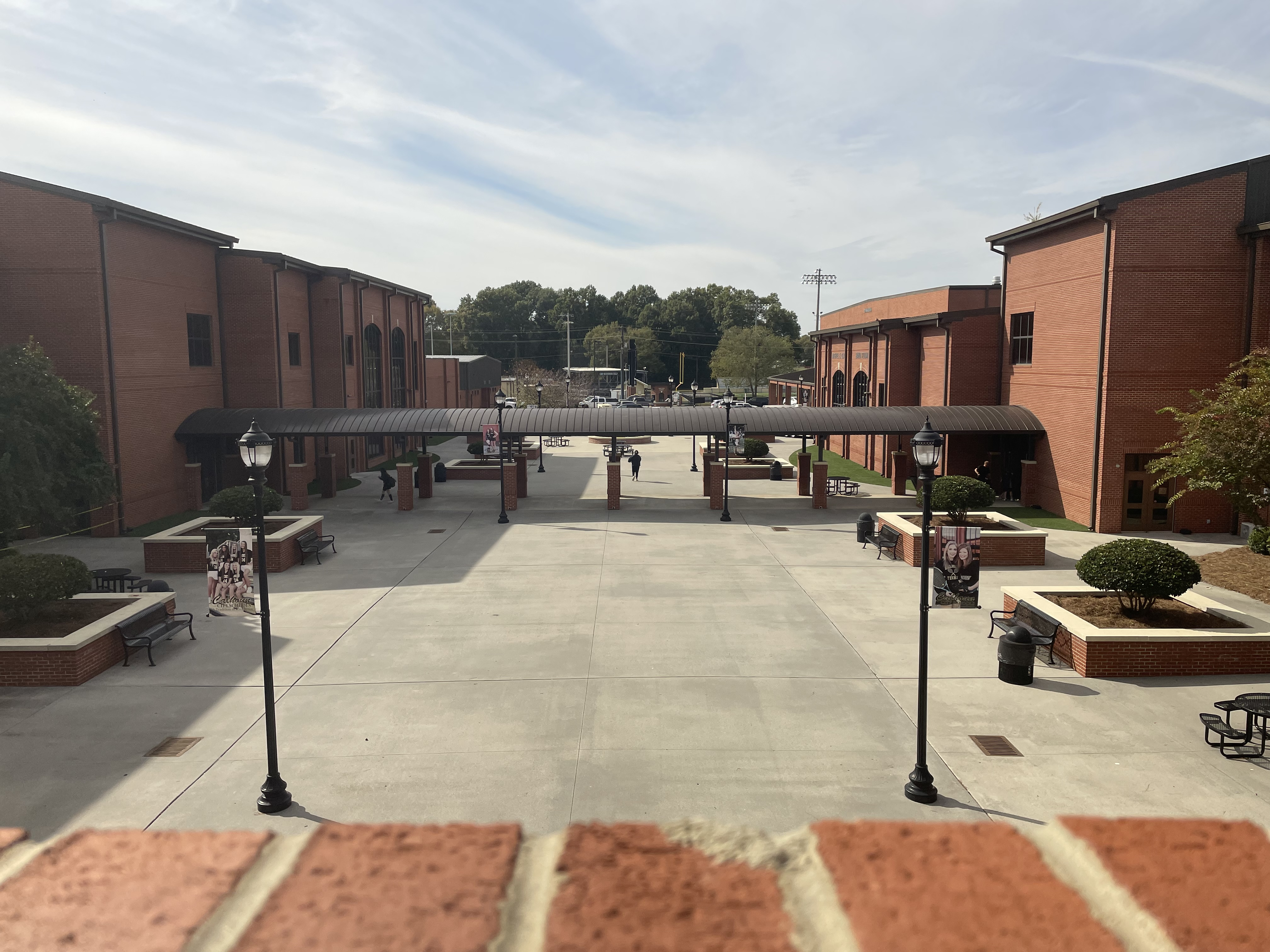
The campus of Calhoun High School as seen from the media center
