= Calhoun City School District =

School district in Calhoun, Georgia, United States

Address
- 380 Barrett Road Calhoun, Georgia, 30701-2248; United States
- Coordinates: 34.512058°N 84.935093°W

District information
- Grades: Pre-school - 12
- Established: December 16, 1901; 123 years ago
- Superintendent: Dr. Michele Taylor
- Accreditation: Southern Association of Colleges and Schools; Georgia Accrediting Commission

Students and staff
- Enrollment: 2,666
- Faculty: 166

Other information
- Telephone: (706) 629-2900
- Fax: (706) 629-3235
- Website: www.calhounschools.org

The Calhoun City School District is a public school district in Gordon County, Georgia, United States, based in Calhoun. It serves the communities of Calhoun and Gordon County.

== Schools ==
The Calhoun City School District has an early learning academy for preschool and kindergarten students, one primary school for grades 1-3, one elementary school for grades 4-6, one middle school, and one high school.

=== Elementary schools ===
- Calhoun Elementary School
- Calhoun Primary School
- Calhoun Early Learning Academy

=== Middle school ===
- Calhoun Middle School

=== High school ===
- Calhoun High School
