= WIPK =

Satellite of WWSZ, Decatur
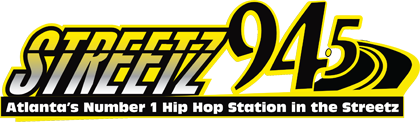
- Calhoun, Georgia; United States
- Broadcast area: Gordon and adjacent counties of northwest Georgia
- Frequency: 94.5 MHz
- Branding: Streetz 94.5

Programming
- Format: Mainstream urban

Ownership
- Owner: C. Steve Hegwood; (Core Communicators North LLC)

History
- First air date: November 2011; 14 years ago

Technical information
- Licensing authority: FCC
- Facility ID: 189512
- Class: A
- ERP: 6,000 watts
- HAAT: 99 m (325 ft)
- Transmitter coordinates: 34°28′18″N 84°53′8″W

Links
- Public license information: Public file; LMS
- Webcast: Listen Live
- Website: streetz945atl.com

WIPK (94.5 FM) is an American radio station licensed to serve the community of Calhoun, Georgia. The station's broadcast is held C. Steve Hegwood, through licensee Core Communicators North LLC.

== Coverage area ==
WIPK transmits from east-southeast of the city, on the ridge east of Interstate 75. Completing its application, construction permit, and application for broadcast license all within 2011, the station serves several counties in northwest Georgia, including all of Gordon county and parts of surrounding ones. The usable signal usually reaches as far south and southeast as the north and northwestern exurbs of metro Atlanta. Reception in the Etowah/Allatoona basin is typically good in places near Cartersville and Woodstock, but south of the ridge that includes Kennesaw Mountain and Sweat Mountain, signal strength drops off going down toward the Chattahoochee River valley, where it is now overwhelmed by W233BF.

== History ==
In June 2011, Radio WEBS, Inc., applied to the Federal Communications Commission (FCC) for a construction permit for a new broadcast radio station. The FCC granted this permit on October 31, 2011, with a scheduled expiration date of October 31, 2014. The new station was assigned call sign "WIPK" on November 8, 2011. After construction and testing were completed in November 2011, the station began broadcasting under program test authority while awaiting its broadcast license.

Having gone on the air in November 2011, right around Thanksgiving, it originally broadcast a radio format of all Christmas music, ranging from country to pop, to long-time classics, and even comedy ("Leroy the Redneck Reindeer", "Santa Looked a Lot Like Daddy", "Christmas Don't Be Late", "The Twelve Pains of Christmas"). This DJ-less broadcast automation continued until around 1:00 AM on January 4, when it switched to an equally wide variety of non-Christmas music, ranging from modern country to Lady Gaga. Previously a recorded announcer, the voiceovers for the interim format were done by speech synthesis, and stated that "a new station is coming soon to this channel", and mentioned cities within the station's broadcast range.

The original launch of its regular format, scheduled for 9:45 a.m. on January 3, 2012, did not occur due to technical issues. On January 17, the station switched to a recording of a heartbeat, with announcements every two minutes that the new format would finally begin the next morning. On January 18, the station manager introduced the WEBS/WIPK staff that had made the new station possible, using the moniker "Kickin' 94.5", and at 9:56 a.m. began playing "Gone Country". The all-country format mixes current music along with songs from recent decades, back to the 1980s.

The FCC granted WIPK its broadcast license on January 27, 2012, after it had already been operating under automatic program test authority for the two months prior.

In August 2014, WIPK had been under contract to be sold to the owner of co-channel W233BF "Streetz 94.5" in Atlanta, which would presumably then simulcast on WIPK, similar to the situation with WTSH-FM and W296BB on 107.1, which also serve northwest Georgia and metro Atlanta respectively. Previously, WIPK had submitted complaints of RF interference caused by W233BF, as had WFDR-FM 94.5 on the other side of Atlanta. The sale closed on January 13, 2015, along with the format change.

On January 13, 2015, WIPK changed their format to a simulcast of urban-formatted WSTR-HD3, branded as "Streetz 94.5".

On October 6, 2015, WIPK broke away from the Streetz simulcast and flipped to Top 40/CHR as "i94.5".

As of February 1, 2019, WIPK went back on the air as Streetz 94.5 hip hop format.

== Previous logos ==
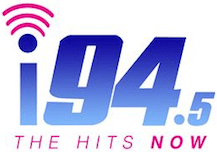
