= WWSZ =

Radio station in Decatur, Georgia

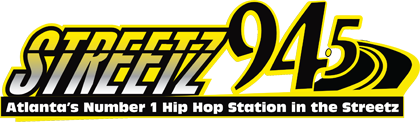
- Decatur, Georgia; United States
- Broadcast area: Atlanta metropolitan area
- Frequency: 1420 kHz
- Branding: Streetz 94.5

Programming
- Format: Mainstream urban

Ownership
- Owner: JDJ Communications, LLC
- Operator: Core Communicators Broadcasting, LLC

History
- First air date: July 19, 1958 (68 years ago)
- Former call signs: WAVO (1958–1992); WWEV (1992–1995); WATB (1995–2018)
- Call sign meaning: "Streetz" branding'

Technical information
- Licensing authority: FCC
- Facility ID: 14745
- Class: D
- Power: 1,000 watts day; 51 watts night
- Transmitter coordinates: 33°47′13″N 84°14′53″W
- Translators: 94.5 W233BF (Atlanta); 105.1 W286DN (Decatur)
- Repeaters: 1040 WPBS (Conyers); 94.5 WIPK (Calhoun)

Links
- Public license information: Public file; LMS
- Webcast: Listen Live
- Website: streetz945atl.com

WWSZ (1420 AM) is a commercial radio station licensed to Decatur, Georgia, and serving the Atlanta metropolitan area. It is owned by JDJ Communications, LLC, and airs a mainstream urban radio format.

WWSZ is simulcast on FM translator station 94.5 W233BF in Atlanta, which forms the middle leg of a three-transmitter simulcast of Streetz on 94.5 MHz, and provides the station's branding of "Streetz 94.5". The station competes along with WHTA and WVEE-FM. It broadcasts with 1,000 watts of power during the daytime, and 51 watts at night, using a directional antenna. The radio station is considered a Class D station by the Federal Communications Commission (FCC). The radio station's transmitter is located on North Decatur Road, near Interstate 285 in Scottdale, Georgia.

== History ==
=== Religious WAVO ===
1420 kHz in Decatur launched as WAVO on July 19, 1958. Owned by the Great Commission Gospel Association, Inc., it was a 1,000-watt daytime-only outlet, licensed for its first two years to Avondale Estates. Bob Jones University acquired WAVO—and WAVQ (94.9 FM), an Atlanta-licensed FM station that signed on in October 1962—in 1963.

The WAVO stations were sold to their first secular interests when Sudbrink Broadcasting of Georgia acquired them in 1971; Bob Jones sold the pair for $682,750. Four years later, however, Sudbrink bought another Atlanta-area AM outlet and donated WAVO AM to the Bible Broadcasting Network of Norfolk, Virginia. The new owners installed their own Christian format.

=== WWEV and WATB ===
BBN first attempted to sell WAVO in late 1988 to the Fiduciary Broadcasting Corporation, controlled by the Thigpen family. That sale failed to materialize, and it would not be until the station was sold in 1992 to the Curriculum Development Foundation, owner of Christian station WWEV-FM 91.5 at Cumming, that BBN shed itself of the facility. The call letters were changed to WWEV, and the AM began to simulcast the contemporary Christian station.

Three years later, the station flipped to gospel music and changed its call letters to WATB. WWEV sold WATB in 1998 to the Freedom Network. Two years later, Freedom sold WATB and stations in other major markets to Multicultural Broadcasting in a $12 million transaction. Under Multicultural, the station aired an eclectic mix of brokered programs, from Christian hip hop shows to Spanish-language coverage of the Atlanta Braves.

On January 28, 2016, the station was granted an FCC construction permit to move to 1430 kHz, increase daytime power to 15,000 watts and increase night power to 158 watts. At night, the antenna pattern would change from directional to nondirectional.

By 2017, the station was airing brokered talk programming under the "Rainbow 1420" name.

=== Streetz 94.5 ===
On June 23, 2012, W233BF, an FM translator at 94.5 MHz that had previously broadcast a Christian format known as "The Spirit 94.5" and which had moved slowly west from Social Circle to the WUPA tower east of downtown, launched a separate hip hop format as "Streetz 94.5". It was the second time that Steve Hegwood, a former Radio One operations manager, had attempted to start a station in Atlanta with that name. It had briefly appeared at a translator he had bought in 2009 without the company's knowledge; Radio One, which owned WAMJ (107.5 FM), contested, and in a settlement, that company acquired the translator.

The 94.5 translator was wedged in between two unrelated stations: WIPK, broadcasting from Calhoun to the north, and WFDR-FM in Woodbury. Complaints from the latter station prompted W233BF to modify its facility and reduce power.

In 2014 and 2015, Hegwood bought WIPK and WFDR-FM, with the stations flipped to Streetz in January and April, respectively. That October, WIPK broke off from the trimulcast as contemporary hit radio outlet "i94.5"; it returned to Streetz in early 2019.

Since launch, W233BF had been fed by a leased HD Radio subchannel of Entercom-owned WSTR (94.1 FM). However, in late 2017, Entercom acquired competing WVEE (103.3 FM) as part of its purchase of CBS Radio. In order to secure a new originating signal, Hegwood worked with JDJ Communications, which had acquired WATB from Way Broadcasting—a subsidiary of Multicultural—in a $960,000 transaction. On January 30, 2018, WATB became WWSZ, and by April, WWSZ had begun broadcasting Streetz, replacing WSTR as the program source for W233BF.

=== W233BF ===
W233BF
Relays WWSZ, Decatur
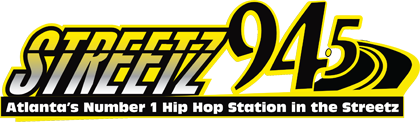
- Atlanta, Georgia; United States
- Broadcast area: Atlanta metropolitan area
- Frequency: 94.5 MHz (HD Radio)
- Branding: Streetz 94.5

Programming
- Format: Urban contemporary radio

Ownership
- Owner: Edgewater Broadcasting; (Core Communicators Broadcasting, LLC)

History
- First air date: July 2003; 23 years ago

Technical information
- Licensing authority: FCC
- Facility ID: 146158
- Class: D
- ERP: 185 watts
- HAAT: 325 m (1,066 ft)
- Transmitter coordinates: 33°44′41″N 84°21′46″W

Links
- Public license information: Public file; LMS
- Webcast: Listen Live
- Website: streetz945atl.com

W233BF (94.5 FM) – branded as Streetz 94.5 – is a radio station in metro Atlanta, now licensed to serve Atlanta owned by Edgewater Broadcasting under an LMA with Core Communications. After a series of moves (previously serving the eastern exurb of Social Circle), the station now transmits from the WUPA tower east of downtown, just north of Interstate 20.

Originally applied-for in 2003, the station went on the air in July 2007, and immediately requested permission to move to 105.3, becoming W287BI. Due to RF interference from full-power WBZY, it requested to go back to 94.5 in July 2010, regaining its old frequency (and therefore callsign) by December that year. In November however, it had already applied to move closer to Atlanta, where it was located north of Conyers, broadcasting a Christian radio format as The Spirit 94.5. In late March 2012, it applied to move to the WUPA tower in the Inman Park neighborhood east of downtown Atlanta. On June 23, 2012, the station flipped to its current local-emphasizing hip hop format, branded as "Streetz 94.5." The station also exchanged RF interference with two co-channel stations: WIPK in northwest Georgia, and WFDR-FM Woodbury. Due to complaints from WFDR, an application was filed with the FCC in early August 2012 to reduce power to 185 watts at the same height and location, and switch to an omnidirectional antenna. In April 2015, it purchased WFDR-FM, effectively removing its biggest hindrance with expanding in the Atlanta area, and that station now also rebroadcasts WSTR-HD3.

In January 2015, the station also purchased and began simulcasting on WIPK FM 94.5 in northwest Georgia, similar to the situation with WTSH-FM and W296BB on 107.1, which also serve northwest Georgia and metro Atlanta respectively. The approximate "boundary" between the two stations' signals is the ridge that includes Kennesaw Mountain and Sweat Mountain. In October of that year, however, WIPK split from the simulcast and flipped to CHR as "i94.5." As of April 2018, the station would begin simulcasting on WWSZ AM 1420 in Decatur.

From the launch of "Streetz" in 2012 until late 2019, the translator was fed by the HD3 sub-channel of WSTR (94.1). This would be dropped after WSTR's owner Entercom acquired long-time urban station (and competitor) WVEE, and flipped the HD3 channel to their "Channel Q" network.
