= James Beverly Langford =

American lawyer and politician

Member of the Georgia Senate
- In office 1973–1980

Personal details
- Born: James Beverly Langford; April 11, 1922 Calhoun, Georgia, U.S.
- Died: April 14, 1996 (aged 74) Atlanta, Georgia, U.S.
- Spouse: Edna Snyder

James Beverly Langford (April 11, 1922 – April 14, 1996) was an American lawyer and politician.

== Biography ==
Langford was born in Calhoun, Georgia and graduated from Calhoun High School. He served in the United States Army during World War II. He received his law degree from the University of Georgia School of Law in 1947. He practiced law in Calhoun, Georgia and was also involved in the banking business. Langford also raised cattle. He served on the local school board. Langford served in the Georgia Senate from 1973 to 1980 and was a Democrat. He then served in the Georgia House of Representatives from 1987 to 1992. Langford helped Jimmy Carter with his Georgia gubernatorial campaigns in 1966 and 1970. He served on the Georgia State Transportation Board from 1993 until his death in 1996. Langford died at Blaircliff Haven Nursing Home in Atlanta, Georgia.

== Family ==
His wife was Edna Snyder Langford and their grandson is Jason Carter who also served in the Georgia General Assembly. Jason Carter's parents are father Jack Carter, the son of President Jimmy Carter and Rosalynn Carter and Judy Langford Carter, the daughter of James Beverly and Edna Langford.
