= Georgia-Cumberland Academy =

Location
- 397 Academy Drive Southwest; Calhoun, Georgia 30701-7405; United States; 34.463058°N 85.019646°W

Information
- Type: Private
- Religious affiliation: Seventh-day Adventist Church
- Established: 1965
- Principal: Serge Gariepy
- Faculty: 31
- Grades: 9 - 12
- Enrollment: 248
- International students: 16
- Classes: 46
- Average class size: 25
- Student to teacher ratio: 1:16
- Campus size: 500 acres (2.0 km^{2})
- Color
- Athletics: Four varsity teams and Acrosport Gymnastics
- Mascot: Jaguar
- Yearbook: Fountain Reveries
- Graduates: 59
- Accreditation: Adventist Accrediting Association; Southern Association of Colleges and Schools
- Website: www.gcasda.org

Georgia-Cumberland Academy (GCA) is a Seventh-day Adventist private high-school operated by the Seventh-day Adventist Church in Georgia and Tennessee located in Calhoun, Georgia, United States. GCA offers an Accrediting Association of Seventh-day Adventist Schools high school diploma program. It is a part of the Seventh-day Adventist education system, the world's second largest Christian school system. It was named the 2004 Seventh-day Adventist Academy of Excellence by the Alumni Awards Foundation.

== History ==
As the school was in the building process, a campaign was started called the "Penny Campaign" which was used to raise money for the school. Nearly three and a half million pennies were collected across the southeast to raise funds for the new music building and were taken to the Atlanta Federal Reserve Bank to be deposited.

GCA opened its doors on August 30, 1965, with 160 students enrolled.

== Academics ==
=== Technology ===
Every classroom is equipped with projectors and the school has implemented a one-to-one laptop program where every student has a laptop. A full IT help desk support staff composed of students performs routine maintenance on the laptops. The IT department streams GCA music and athletic events so that parents can watch online, and maintains the school website. The graphics department has done work for various companies.

=== Performing arts ===
GCA has a very active performing arts program. The department consists of two choral groups, a drama team, concert band, and other small band ensembles. Camerata, the elite touring group from the school, participates in local community events, weekend trips to churches and schools, and a biennial touring trip to various places around the U.S. The GCA Choral is the school's more general singing group, which is taken as a course for credit and is the largest group on campus. GCA also has a full concert band that performs locally at the GCA church and occasionally goes on tour.

Several GCA students have been recognized with various awards and recognition, such as performing in the Southeastern Piano Festival at the University of South Carolina, and the Berry College Concerto Competition.

=== Athletics ===
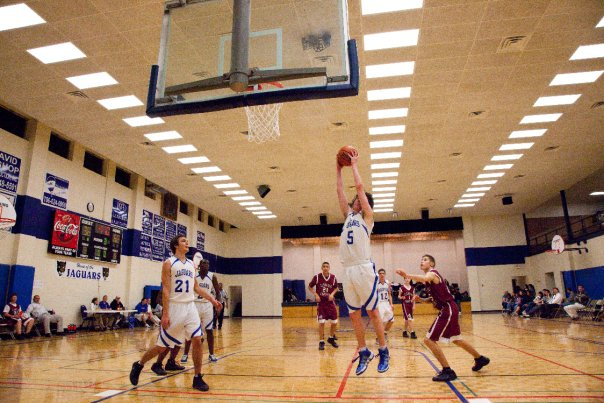
GCA basketball (2009)

Various athletic opportunities are offered by the school. Students can participate in four varsity team sports, potato chip eating contests, and video game nights. Sports offered at the varsity level include boys' basketball, girls' basketball, boys' soccer and girls' volleyball. Wally Fox has been the athletic director since 1975.

=== Mission trips ===
Three annual mission trips are sponsored by the school. In October, GCA joins Madison Academy and Columbia Adventist Academy to serve the people in the Appalachian foothills of Liberty, Kentucky. They do various jobs such as building churches, school houses, and picnic shelters; painting; and fixing homes in desperate need of repair. During spring break in early March, a group of students travel to Central America to build churches and offer evangelistic meetings. More recently the school has sponsored trips to Thailand and China, working on humanitarian projects with ADRA.

== See also ==
- List of Seventh-day Adventist secondary schools
- Seventh-day Adventist education
