= WJTH =

Country music radio station in Calhoun, Georgia

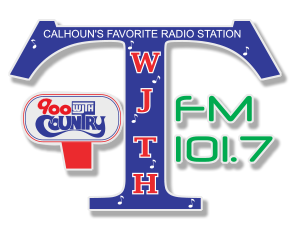
- Calhoun, Georgia; United States
- Broadcast area: Gordon County, Georgia
- Frequency: 900 kHz

Programming
- Format: Country music
- Affiliations: USA Radio Network, Motor Racing Network

Ownership
- Owner: Cherokee Broadcasting Company

History
- First air date: 1977

Technical information
- Licensing authority: FCC
- Facility ID: 10067
- Class: B
- Power: 1,000 watts (day); 266 watts (night)
- Transmitter coordinates: 34°27′40.00″N 84°53′44.00″W
- Translator: 101.7 W269CC (Adairsville)

Links
- Public license information: Public file; LMS
- Website: wjth.com

WJTH (900 AM) is a radio station licensed to Calhoun, Georgia, United States, broadcasting a country music format. Owned by Cherokee Broadcasting Company, it features programming from USA Radio Network, GNN (Georgia News Network) and Motor Racing Network. WJTH also transmits on broadcast translator W269CC (101.7 FM) in Adairsville.

WJTH uses a folded unipole antenna.
