= Rock Garden, Calhoun =

Rock garden in Calhoun, Georgia, USA

Coordinates: 34.463979°N 84.983890°W

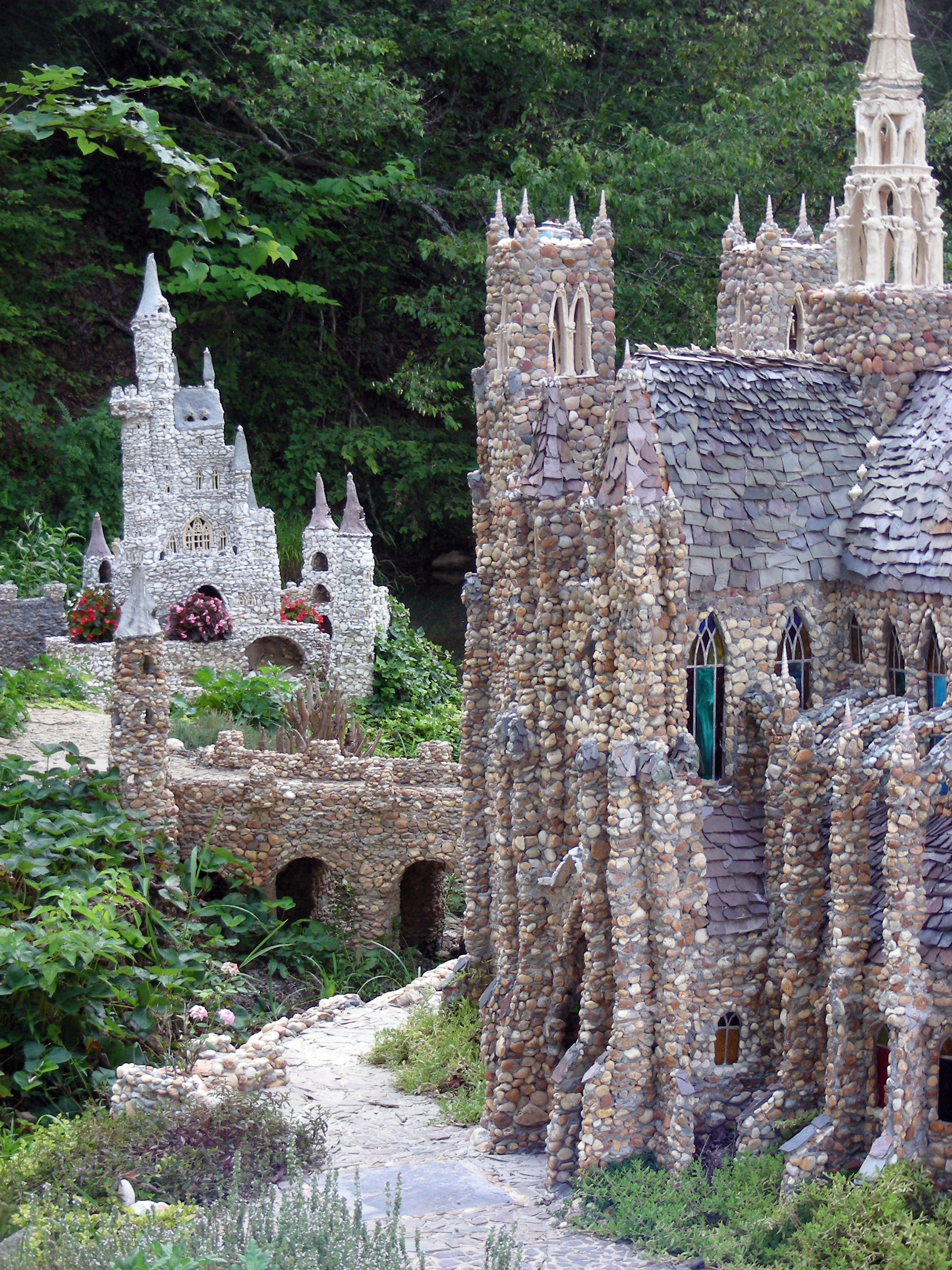
The Notre Dame cathedral (right) and a castle (background) in the Calhoun Rock Garden

The Rock Garden (also known as The Garden) in Calhoun, Georgia, is a garden filled with more than 50 miniature castles, churches, and other structures. The Garden, with its whimsical folk art, has become a local tourist attraction.

== Background ==
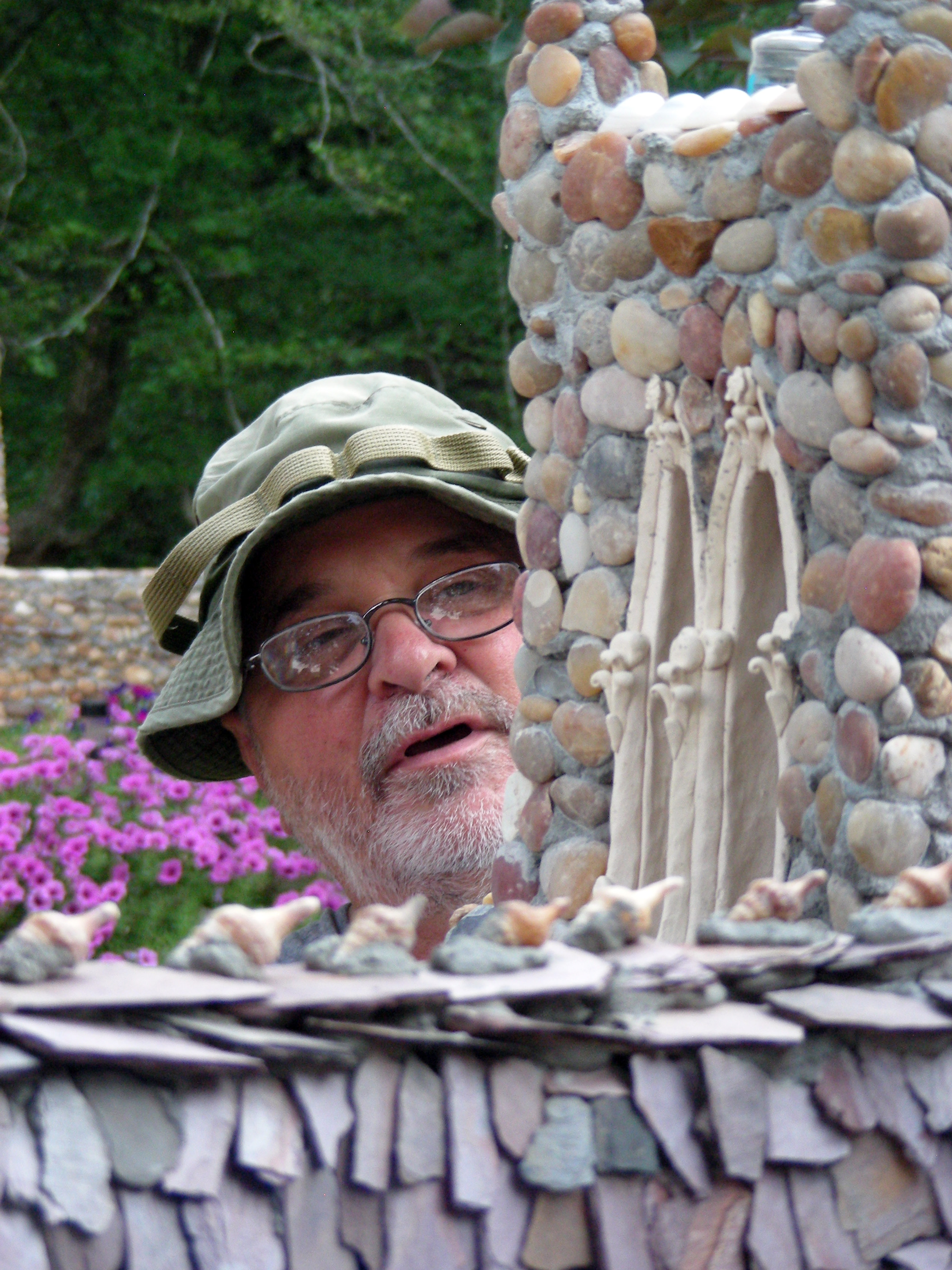
"Old Dog," the creator of the Rock Garden, next to the model of the Notre Dame Cathedral in 2011

The Rock Garden grew out of a "Town Game" Dewitt Boyd played with his eight children, in which he would create a village of tiny houses and tiny alter-ego porcelain figures for each child to play with. Boyd chose Genghis Khan as his alternative persona. Each time the family moved, Boyd recreated the village.

In 2007, Boyd started building the Rock Garden as the latest iteration of the Town Game. The Rock Garden is located beside a stream behind the Calhoun Seventh-Day Adventist church, where Boyd is a member. Boyd prefers to be called "Old Dog." He says he is "kind of a scoundrel" and working in the garden helps keep him out of trouble. Boyd's children and grandchildren, as well as many other volunteers, have helped construct the miniature buildings.

== Construction ==
Through trial and error, Boyd developed his current method of using cement reinforced with wire to build structures out of pebbles, shells, tiles, and broken glass and china. Previously, when Boyd and his family lived in the midwest, they built their miniature town out of clay but discovered that the structures broke into shards when they froze in the winter cold. The work is slow and labor-intensive. For example, the Notre Dame Cathedral took 27 months to build.

== Features ==
The Rock Garden contains miniature versions of several famous structures, including:

- The cathedral of Notre Dame, complete with stained glass windows
- The Japanese Himeji Castle
- The Colosseum

In between the villages and structures are narrow cobblestone paths and bridges that people can walk on.

Each autumn, the Garden hosts an annual lighting ceremony where the castles and other miniature buildings are lit by candlelight.

Boyd's wife, Joyce Maples, also works on the Garden and is responsible for the Memory Wall with clay hearts for each marriage ceremony that has taken place in the Garden. As of 2016, 16 wedding ceremonies had taken place in the Garden, including one between Boyd and Joyce.

== Gallery ==
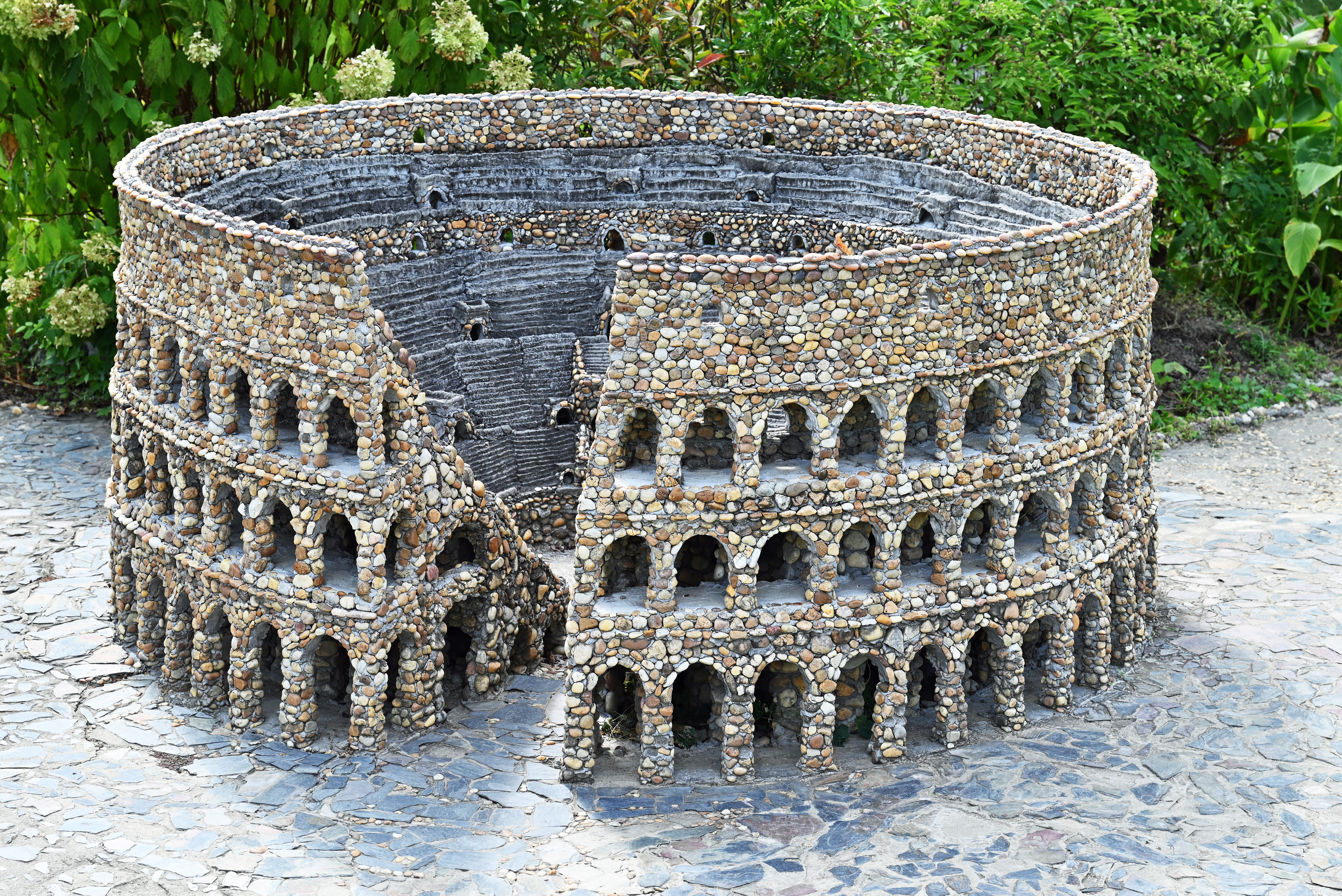
Roman Collisseum

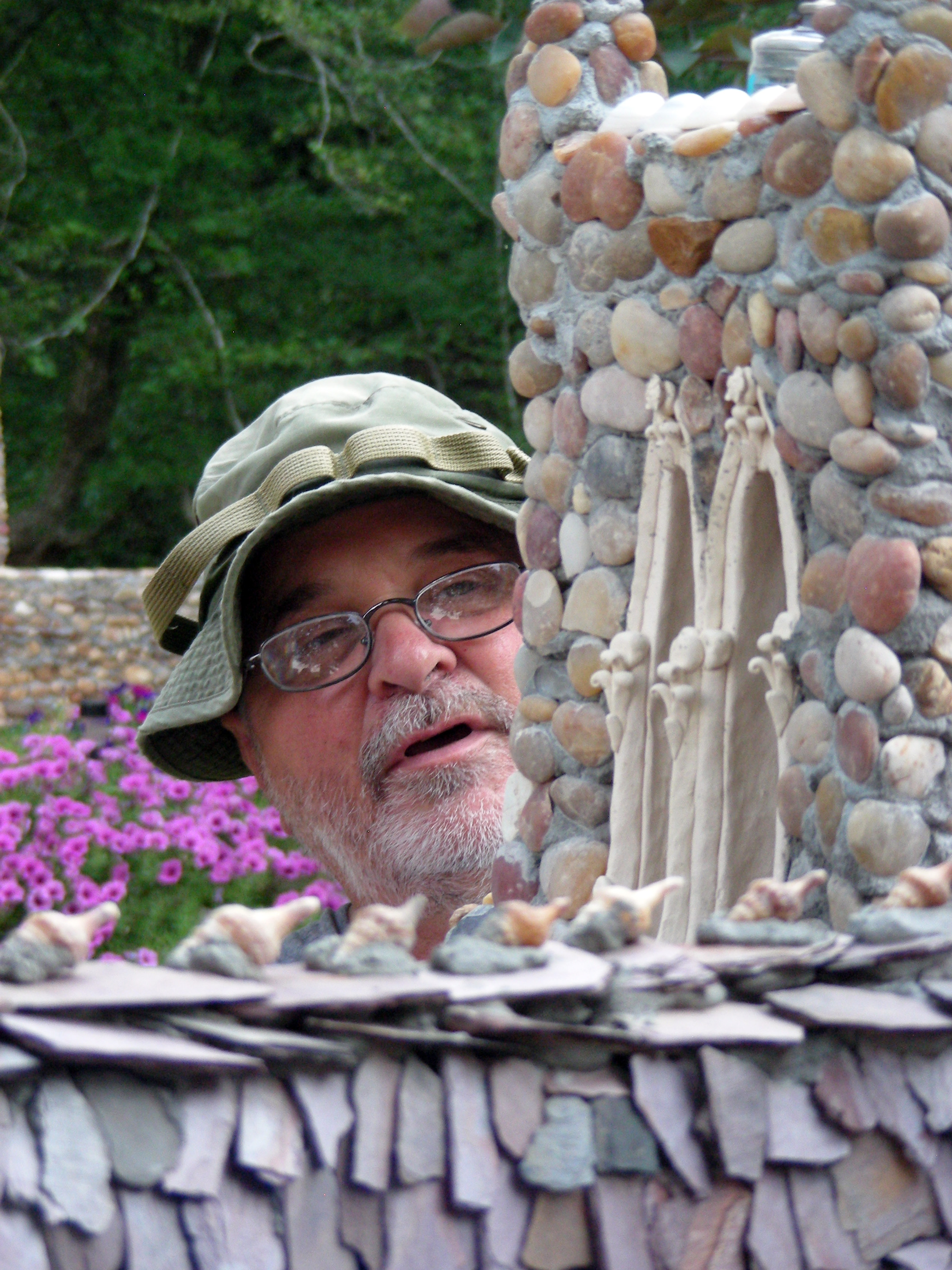
Builder Dewitt "Old Dog" Boyd

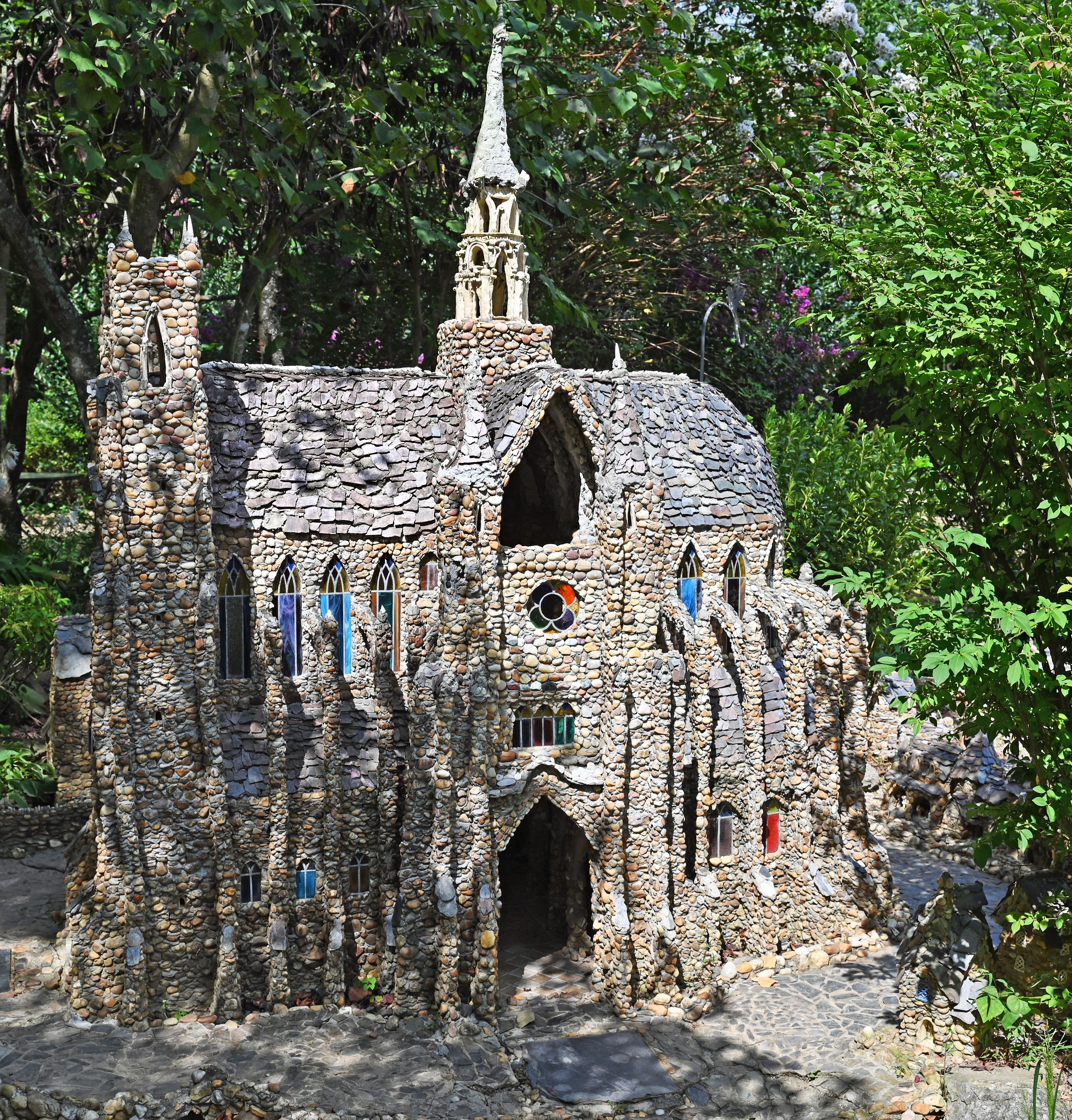
Notre Dame

== See also ==
- Miniature park
- Rock garden
