= Calhoun, Georgia =

- City
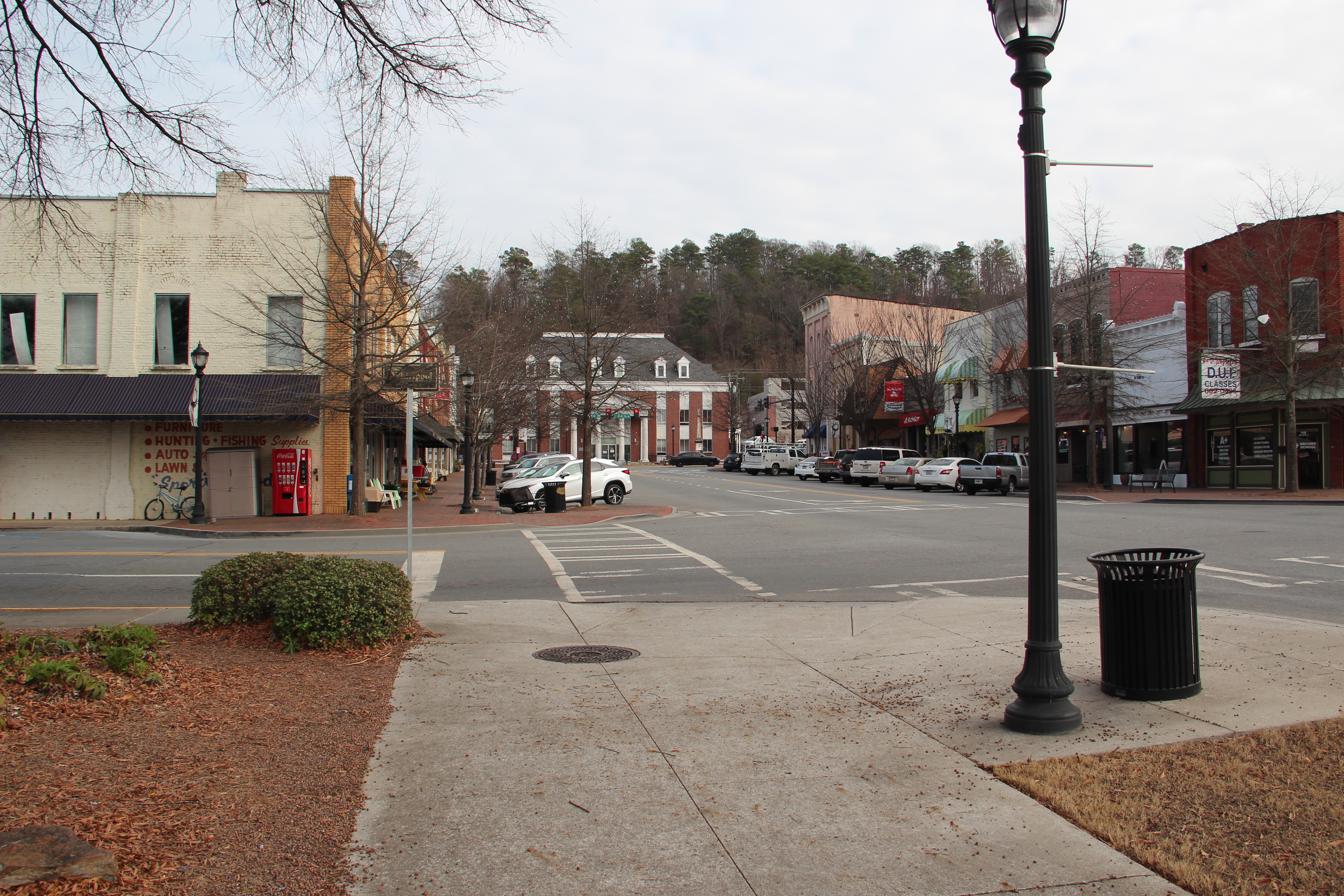
- Downtown Calhoun and courthouse

- Flag Seal
- Motto: "Land of the Cherokee"
- Location in Gordon County and the state of Georgia
- Coordinates: 34°30′0″N 84°56′33″W
- Country: United States
- State: Georgia
- County: Gordon
- Incorporated (city): January 1852
- Named for: John C. Calhoun

Area
  - Total: 16.11 sq mi (41.72 km^{2})
  - Land: 16.03 sq mi (41.53 km^{2})
  - Water: 0.073 sq mi (0.19 km^{2})
- Elevation: 659 ft (201 m)

Population (2020)
  - Total: 16,949
  - Density: 1,057.0/sq mi (408.11/km^{2})
- Time zone: UTC-5 (Eastern (EST))
  - Summer (DST): UTC-4 (EDT)
- ZIP codes: 30701, 30703 (PO Boxes)
- Area codes: 706/762
- FIPS code: 13-12456
- GNIS feature ID: 0354936
- Website: www.cityofcalhoun-ga.com

Calhoun is a city in Gordon County, Georgia, United States. As of the 2020 census, the city had a population of 16,949. Calhoun is the county seat of Gordon County.

== History ==
In December 1827, Georgia had already claimed the Cherokee lands that became Gordon County and other counties. A small town called "Dawsonville" was created and founded in Gordon County, named for the owner of an early general store. Dawsonville was later renamed "Calhoun" to honor U.S. Senator John C. Calhoun, following his death in 1850.

Gordon County's inferior court called an election for the selection of the county seat, offering voters a choice between a site on the Western & Atlantic Railroad (near Adairsville) or a site more centrally located within the county. Voters chose a site along the railroad, so the inferior court designated Calhoun as county seat in 1851. The legislature incorporated Calhoun in an act approved on January 12, 1852.

On January 5, 1861, Georgia seceded from the Union as a prelude to the American Civil War. Calhounians joined the Confederacy. Most warfare took place elsewhere, but on May 16, 1864, Calhoun was near where the Union General William Tecumseh Sherman and Confederate General Joseph E. Johnston postured before the Battle of Adairsville during Sherman's Atlanta campaign. Oakleigh, the home of Dr. Wall, was used by Sherman as his headquarters at that time.

A tornado on March 20, 1888, leveled much of Calhoun. A devastating fire on October 23 of that year destroyed most of what remained.

== Geography ==
Calhoun is located west of the center of Gordon County at 34°30′0″N 84°56′33″W (34.499898, -84.942584), along the Oostanaula River where it is joined by Oothkalooga Creek. It is part of the Coosa River/Alabama River watershed.

U.S. Route 41 passes through the center of town as Wall Street, and Interstate 75 runs along the eastern edge of the city, with access from Exits 310, 312, 315, 317, and 318. I-75 leads north 49 miles (79 km) to Chattanooga, Tennessee, and south 68 miles (109 km) to Atlanta. US-41, running parallel to I-75, leads north 5 miles (8.0 km) to Resaca and south 10 miles (16 km) to Adairsville. Georgia State Route 156 runs west out of town as West Line Street, leading 18 miles (29 km) to Armuchee, and heads east out of town as Red Bud Road, leading 8 miles (13 km) to Red Bud. Georgia State Route 373 (East Line Street and Dews Pond Road) leads east 8 miles (13 km) to Cash. Georgia State Route 136 (North River Street) leads northwest 30 miles (48 km) to LaFayette. Georgia State Route 53 passes through the southern part of Calhoun, leading east 15 miles (24 km) to Fairmount and southwest 22 miles (35 km) to Rome.

According to the United States Census Bureau, the city of Calhoun has a total area of 15.0 square miles (38.9 km^{2}), of which 14.9 square miles (38.7 km^{2}) is land and 0.1 square miles (0.2 km^{2}), or 0.64%, is water.

=== Climate ===
The climate in this area is characterized by relatively high temperatures and evenly distributed precipitation throughout the year. According to the Köppen Climate Classification system, Calhoun has a humid subtropical climate, abbreviated "Cfa" on climate maps.

Climate data for Calhoun, Georgia
Month	Jan	Feb	Mar	Apr	May	Jun	Jul	Aug	Sep	Oct	Nov	Dec	Year
Mean daily maximum °C (°F)	10 (50)	13 (55)	18 (64)	23 (73)	27 (80)	31 (87)	32 (90)	32 (89)	29 (84)	23 (74)	17 (63)	12 (54)	22 (72)
Mean daily minimum °C (°F)	−2 (28)	−1 (31)	3 (38)	8 (46)	12 (54)	17 (62)	19 (66)	18 (65)	14 (58)	8 (46)	3 (37)	−1 (30)	8 (47)
Average precipitation mm (inches)	130 (5.1)	130 (5.1)	160 (6.2)	120 (4.8)	110 (4.4)	100 (4)	110 (4.5)	94 (3.7)	110 (4.2)	84 (3.3)	110 (4.2)	120 (4.8)	1,380 (54.2)
Source: Weatherbase

== Demographics ==
Historical population
Census	Pop.	Note	%±
1870	427		—
1880	510		19.4%
1890	680		33.3%
1900	851		25.1%
1910	1,652		94.1%
1920	1,955		18.3%
1930	2,371		21.3%
1940	2,955		24.6%
1950	3,231		9.3%
1960	3,587		11.0%
1970	4,748		32.4%
1980	5,563		17.2%
1990	7,135		28.3%
2000	10,667		49.5%
2010	15,650		46.7%
2020	16,949		8.3%
2025 (est.)	20,196	▲	19.2%
U.S. Decennial Census; 2025

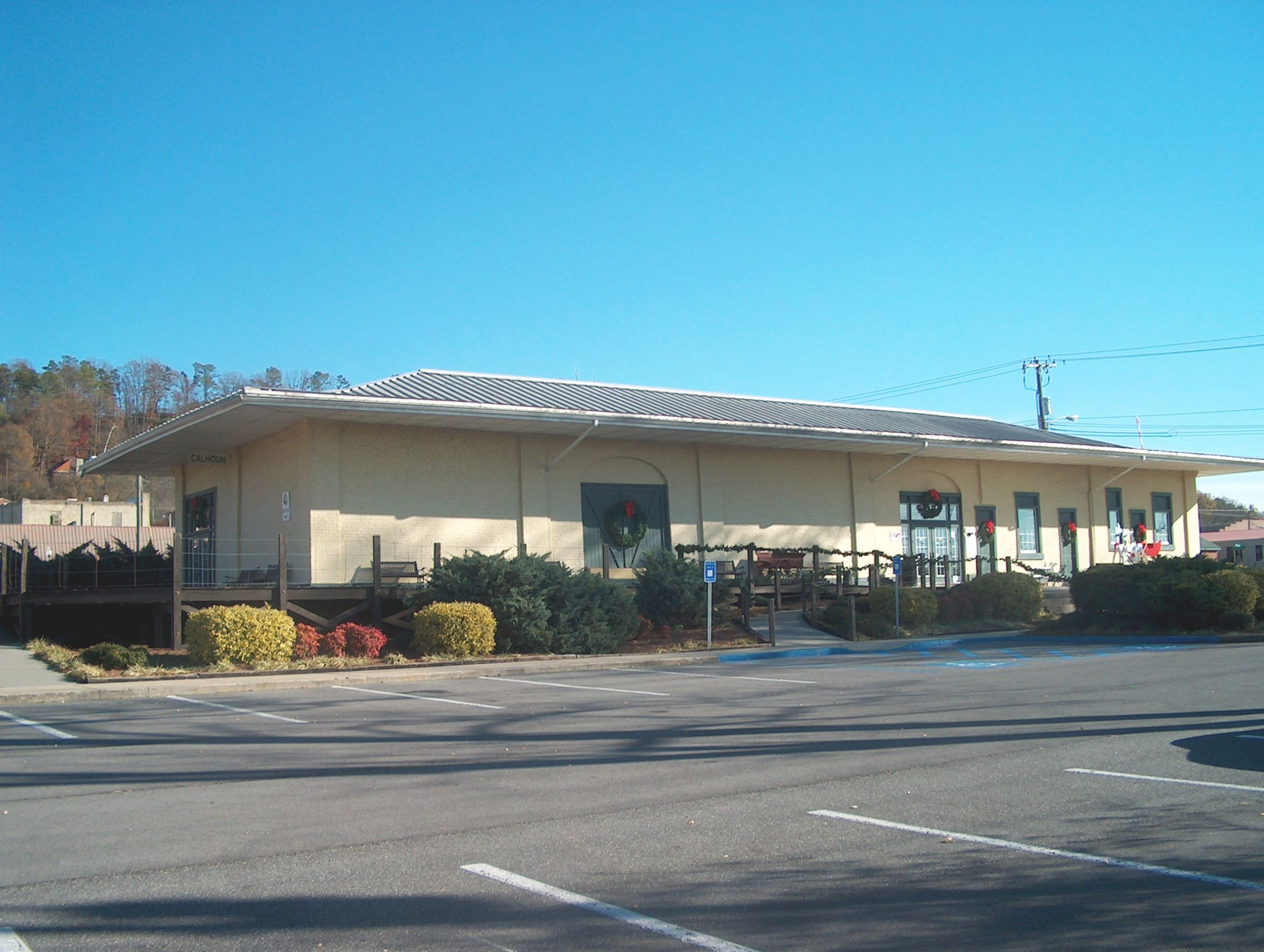
Calhoun Railroad Depot was one of the train stations in 1862 where the Great Locomotive Chase passed from Adairsville, Georgia.

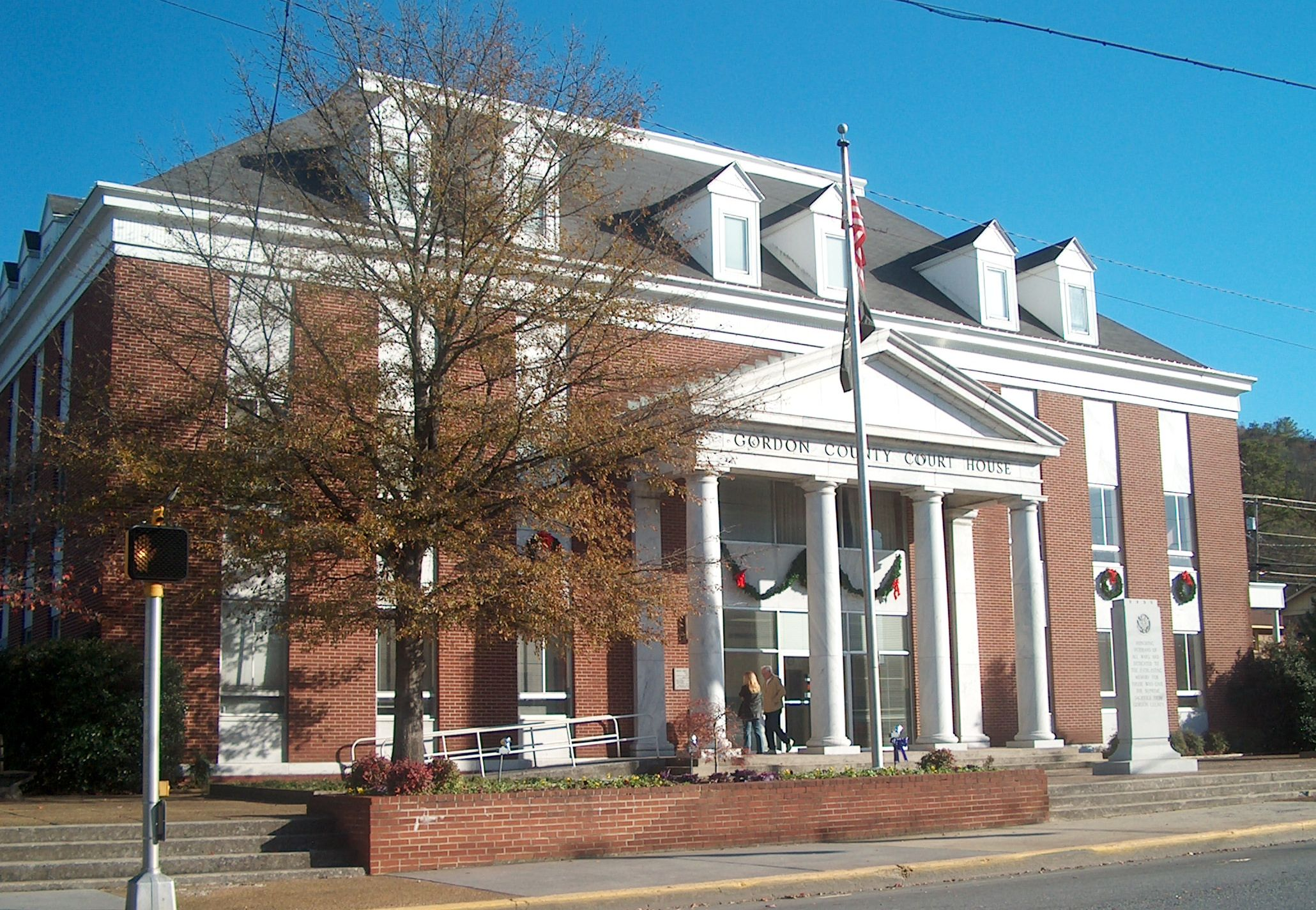
1960 courthouse on the site of former 1880 courthouse

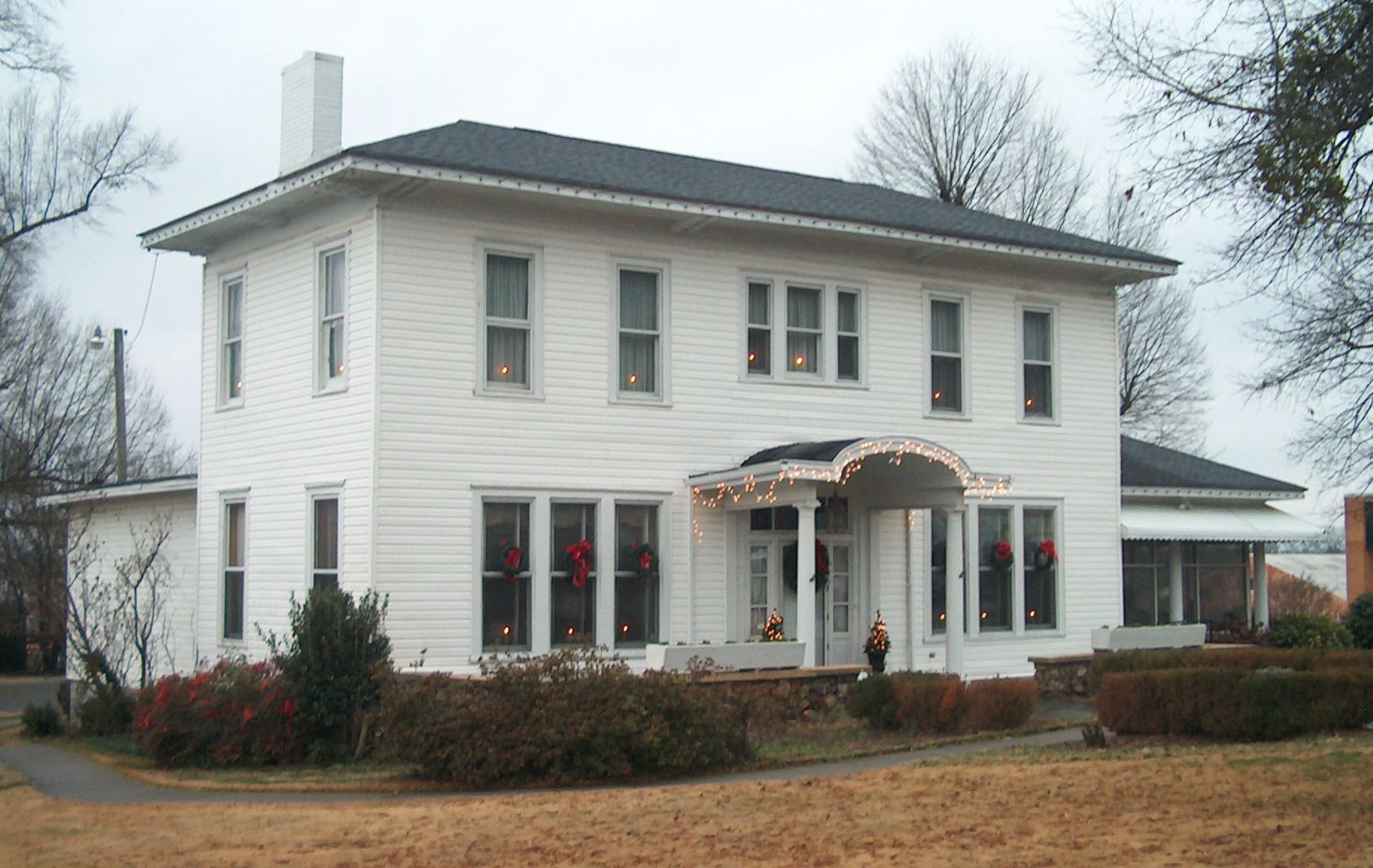
Oakleigh, once a headquarters of General Sherman and home of Dr. Wall, now Gordon Historical Society

=== 2020 census ===
As of the 2020 census, Calhoun had a population of 16,949, with 6,497 households and 4,001 families. The median age was 36.7 years. 25.4% of residents were under the age of 18 and 15.6% were 65 years of age or older. For every 100 females, there were 88.7 males, and for every 100 females age 18 and over, there were 83.6 males age 18 and over.

98.2% of residents lived in urban areas, while 1.8% lived in rural areas.

Of all households, 35.2% had children under the age of 18 living in them, 41.3% were married-couple households, 16.8% were households with a male householder and no spouse or partner present, and 34.1% were households with a female householder and no spouse or partner present. About 29.4% of all households were made up of individuals, and 12.9% had someone living alone who was 65 years of age or older.

There were 6,896 housing units, of which 5.8% were vacant. The homeowner vacancy rate was 1.7% and the rental vacancy rate was 4.7%.

Calhoun racial composition
Race	Num.	Perc.
White	10,204	60.2%
Black or African American	1,154	6.81%
Native American	26	0.15%
Asian	454	2.68%
Pacific Islander	6	0.04%
Other/mixed-race	708	4.18%
Hispanic or Latino	4,397	25.94%

=== 2000 census ===
As of the census of 2000, there were 10,667 people, 4,049 households, and 2,672 families residing in the city. The population density was 915.4 inhabitants per square mile (353.4/km^{2}). There were 4,298 housing units at an average density of 368.8 per square mile (142.4/km^{2}). The racial makeup of the city was 77.91% White, 7.56% African American, 0.42% Native American, 1.00% Asian, 0.14% Pacific Islander, 11.61% from other races, and 1.36% from two or more races. 17.07% of the population was Hispanic or Latino of any race.

There were 4,049 households, out of which 30.9% had children under the age of 18 living with them, 47.8% were married couples living together, 13.9% had a female householder with no husband present, and 34.0% were non-families. 28.8% of all households were made up of individuals, and 12.0% had someone living alone who was 65 years of age or older. The average household size was 2.56 and the average family size was 3.07.

In the city, the population was spread out, with 24.2% under the age of 18, 11.2% from 18 to 24, 31.0% from 25 to 44, 20.1% from 45 to 64, and 13.5% who were 65 years of age or older. The median age was 34 years. For every 100 females, there were 98.9 males. For every 100 females age 18 and over, there were 96.7 males.

The median income for a household in the city was $33,618, and the median income for a family was $42,310. Males had a median income of $27,616 versus $25,018 for females. The per capita income for the city was $19,887. About 12.5% of families and 16.8% of the population were below the poverty line, including 20.8% of those under age 18 and 19.1% of those age 65 or over.

== Arts and culture ==
=== Museums and other points of interest ===
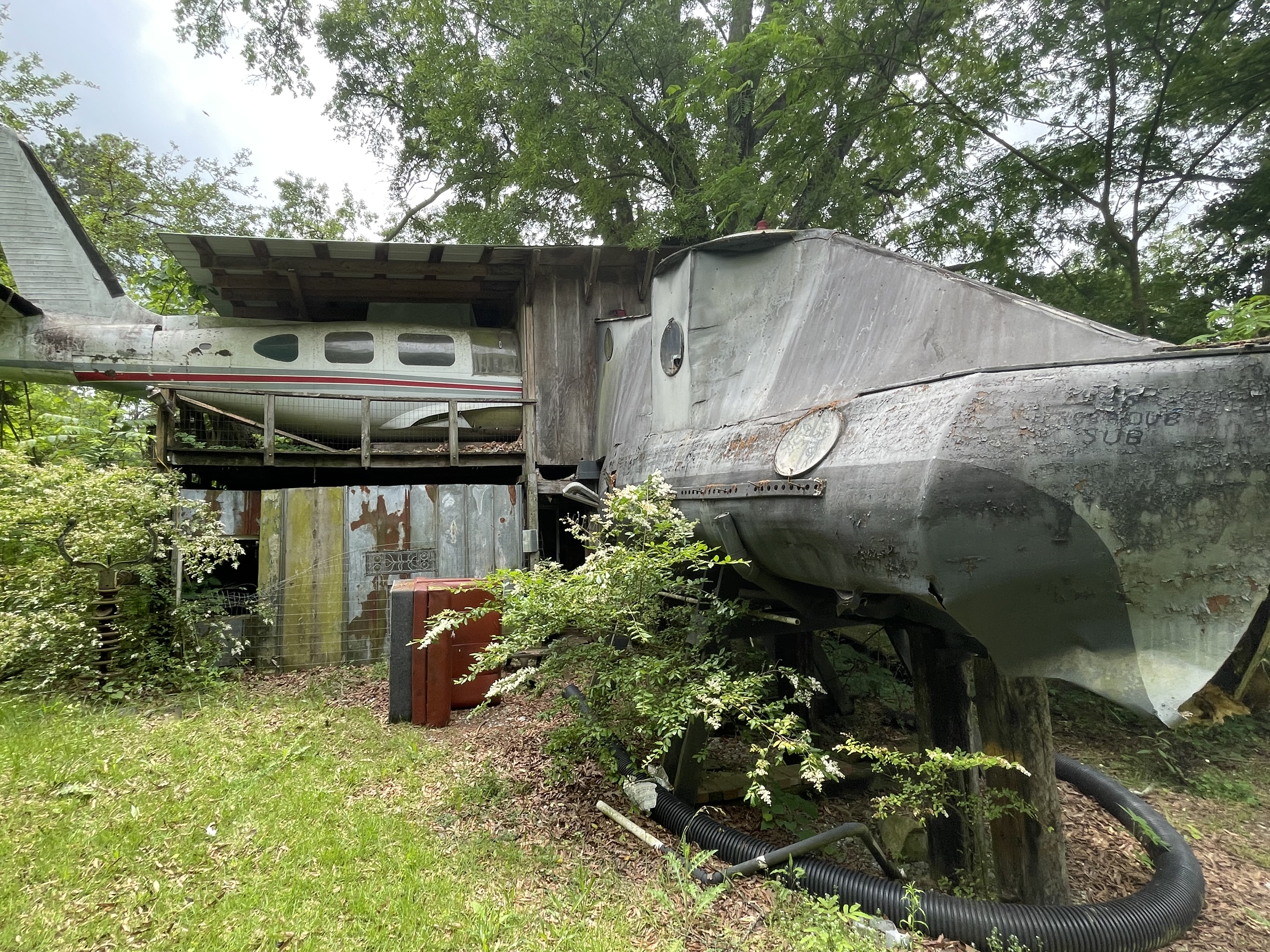
Sam's Tree House

- The Rock Garden, containing miniature castles, churches, and other structures
- New Echota Historic Site, first Cherokee capital
- Roland Hayes Museum at the Harris Arts Center
- Oakleigh/Gordon County Historical Society
- Premium Outlets of Calhoun
- Phil Reeve Stadium
- Sam's Treehouse

== Education ==
=== Calhoun City School District ===
The Calhoun City School District serves preschool to grade twelve, and consists of two elementary schools, a middle school, and a high school, separate from the county school district. The district has 166 full-time teachers and over 2,666 students.

- Calhoun Early Learning Academy - grades Pre-K–K
- Calhoun Primary School - grades 1–3
- Calhoun Elementary School - grades 4–6
- Calhoun Middle School - grades 7–8
- Calhoun High School - grades 9-12

=== Gordon County School District ===
The Gordon County School District holds pre-school to grade twelve. It consists of six elementary schools, two middle schools and two high schools, serving the area outside the city limits. The district has 365 full-time teachers and over 6,259 students.

- Red Bud Elementary - grades Pre-K–5
- W.L Swain Elementary - grades Pre-K–5
- Belwood Elementary School - grades Pre-K–5
- Sonoraville Elementary School - grades Pre-K–5
- Fairmount Elementary School - grades Pre-K–5
- Max V. Tolbert Elementary School - grades Pre-K–5
- Ashworth Middle School Grades - grades 6–8
- Red Bud Middle School Grades - grades 6–8
- Gordon Central High School - grades 9–12
- Sonoraville High School - grades 9–12

=== Religious schools ===
==== Seventh-day Adventist ====
- John L. Coble Elementary School - K–8th grades
- Georgia-Cumberland Academy - boarding 9–12 high school

=== Higher education ===
- Georgia Northwestern Technical College (formerly Coosa Valley Technical College)

== Media ==
=== Print ===
The twice-weekly Calhoun Times, established in 1870, is Gordon County's oldest operating business. With home delivery print editions each Wednesday and Saturday, the paper also has a website and various social media. Blake Silvers has been managing editor of the Calhoun Times since January 2021.

=== Radio and TV ===
Although well outside of metro Atlanta, Calhoun is considered part of the Atlanta television market, the ninth-largest DMA according to Nielsen Media Research. Cable TV service is offered through Comcast Cable, which provides one public, educational, and government access (PEG) cable TV channel named WEBS cable 3.

Four radio stations have Calhoun as their city of license:

- WEBS AM 1030, playing oldies, simulcasts on local Xfinity cable channel 3; station originally broadcast on AM 1110, from approximately 1965 to 1990
- WIPK FM 94.5, owned by WEBS, went on-air in late 2011 with a country music format.
- WJTH AM 900, playing country music; frequency was earlier assigned to WCGA, which broadcast from approximately 1950–1975
  - W269CC 101.7, transmitting WJTH programming from WJTH tower, but having nearby Adairsville as the city of license
- WLOJ-LP 102.9, religious (owned and operated by the Calhoun Seventh-day Adventist Church)

Many other stations from Rome, Atlanta, and Chattanooga are also available across northwest Georgia, though reception of these often depends on weather.

== Healthcare ==
The only hospital in the city is AdventHealth Gordon.

== Notable people ==
- Elias Boudinot (1802–1839), born Gallegina Uwati, also known as Buck Watie, Cherokee leader who believed that acculturation was critical to the tribe's survival; influential in the period of removal to the West
- Ken Carson (2000–), rapper
- Charlie Culberson, Major League Baseball player
- Kris Durham, professional football player; wide receiver for the Oakland Raiders
- Roland Hayes (1887–1977),lyric tenor, considered the first African-American male concert artist to receive wide acclaim both at home and internationally, born here and attended Calhoun schools
- McCartney Kessler (1999–), professional tennis player; active in the WTA Tour since 2024
- Tre Lamb, college football coach for the Tulsa Golden Hurricanes
- Bert Lance (1931–2013), businessman, former director of the Office of Management and Budget during the Carter administration
- James Beverly Langford (1922–1996), lawyer, businessman, and Georgia state legislator
- John Meadows III (1944–2018), businessman, mayor of Calhoun, and Georgia state legislator
- Larkin Poe, music duo
- Sequoyah (George Gist or George Guess; c.1767–1843), Cherokee, inventor of the Cherokee Syllabary, the only time in recorded history that a member of a non-literate people independently created an effective writing system; namesake of California's giant Sequoia sempervirens redwood tree
- William Thompson (1848–1918), Olympic gold medal winner
- Stand Watie (1806–1871), Cherokee leader and Confederate general
- Dale Willis (1938–2021), Major League Baseball player
