= WFTD =

Marietta, Georgia; United States
- Broadcast area: Atlanta metropolitan area
- Frequency: 1080 kHz (analog)
- Branding: La Ley 1080 AM

Programming
- Language: Spanish
- Format: Regional Mexican

Ownership
- Owner: Prieto Broadcasting, Inc.

History
- First air date: November 14, 1955
- Former call signs: WBIE (1955–1974); WCOB (1974–1985); WEKS (1985–1987); WECA (1987–1988)
- Call sign meaning: Waiting For The Day (previous religious format)

Technical information
- Licensing authority: FCC
- Class: D
- Power: 50,000 watts day 30,000 watts critical hours
- Transmitter coordinates: 34.023303°N 84.667372°W
- Translator: 96.5 W243DQ (Marietta) since 2019

Links
- Public license information: Public file; LMS
- Website: [ laley1080am.com | Website] (Incomplete)

WFTD (1080 kHz) is a commercial AM radio station licensed to Marietta, Georgia, United States and serving the Atlanta metropolitan area. The station is owned by Prieto Broadcasting, Inc. and airs a Regional Mexican format. Programming is also heard on FM translator W243DQ at 96.5 MHz.

By day, WFTD operates at the maximum power permitted for AM radio stations, 50,000 watts. During critical hours it runs 30,000 watts, in both cases using a directional antenna system. WFTD is classified as a Class D station according to the Federal Communications Commission, so it must sign-off during nighttime hours to avoid interference to clear channel stations WTIC in Hartford, Connecticut, and KRLD in Dallas, also on AM 1080.

== History ==
On November 14, 1955, WBIE signed on as a full-service daytimer facility owned by James M. Wilder. Wilder later started a simulcast on WBIE-FM 101.5 MHz (now WKHX-FM). WBIE's original operating frequency was 1050 kHz, powered at 500 watts, using a non-directional antenna. In 1965, WBIE moved to 1080 kHz with 10,000 watts directional, still daytime only. That enabled WBIE to pick up the CBS Radio Network affiliation for the Metro Atlanta area, which it held onto well into the 1970s. Several noted newscasters worked at WBIE early in their careers, including Steve Walsh (later at KGO/ABC News), and Chris Little (KFI News Director). Over the years, the station switched call signs, to WCOB in 1978, WEKS in 1985, and WJYA in 1986. WFTD's current call sign has remained with the station since 1988; during this period station transmitter power was increased to 50,000 watts, though still a directional daytime-only operation.

From the 1980s through the 1990s, WFTD was the official radio home of Roswell Street Baptist Church and broadcast the weekly sermon of longtime pastor Dr. Nelson L. Price as well as additional RSBC programming. Roswell Street renamed the station as WFTD, which stands for "Waiting For The Day" that Jesus Christ returns.

Through the early 2000s, WFTD aired programming for the Mexican-American community. In July 2007 WFTD switched formats to carry a Korean language radio format, branded as "Atlanta Radio Korea", as a result of a local marketing agreement (LMA).

On June 9, 2008, WFTD was a victim of a molotov cocktail bomb when a former employee who had been fired two months earlier walked into the station's Norcross studios and left a bomb there. As a result of the bomb, a small fire was sparked, but was quickly extinguished and the man who threw the cocktail suffered severe burns.

By mid-2009, "Atlanta Radio Korea" was simulcasting its programming with 1040 WPBS. A short time later, "Atlanta Radio Korea" was heard exclusively on WPBS and dropped from WFTD. WFTD then started carrying Mexican-American music and talk programming under the "Radio La Ley 1080 AM" branding. From 2015, this station has been broadcasting Vietnamese programming.

In December 2016, Atlanta Radio Korea purchased WQXI (simulcasting WSTR) and flipped it Korean programming. In turn, Viet Song Media bought WPBS and switched it to Vietnamese programming on New Year's Day 2017. WFTD then flipped to oldies, specializing in tunes from the 1950s and early 1960s, without any DJs and repeating their identification after every song.

Effective July 1, 2017, WFTD dropped the temporary "oldies" format, and returned to Spanish language programming under the name "La Mega Mundial" (The latter format first appeared on WTBS-LP analog channel 6, until 2016).

On January 2, 2018, its Spanish CHR format was relaunched.
