= WPBS (AM) =

Simulcasts WWSZ Decatur
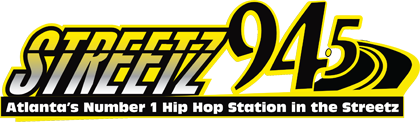
- Conyers, Georgia; United States
- Broadcast area: Atlanta metropolitan area
- Frequency: 1040 kHz
- Branding: Streetz 94.5

Programming
- Format: Mainstream urban

Ownership
- Owner: Vanessa Nguyen
- Operator: Core Communicators Broadcasting, LLC

History
- First air date: April 4, 1979
- Former call signs: WCGA (1979–1986); WTPO (1986–1989); WPBE (1989–2003)

Technical information
- Licensing authority: FCC
- Facility ID: 42070
- Class: D
- Power: 50,000 watts day 5,500 watts critical hours
- Transmitter coordinates: 33.680957°N 84.028979°W
- Translator: 99.1 W256DJ (Conyers)

Links
- Public license information: Public file; LMS
- Webcast: Listen Live
- Website: streetz945atl.com

WPBS (1040 kHz) is a commercial AM radio station licensed to the city of Conyers, Georgia. It broadcasts a mainstream urban radio format for the Atlanta media market. The station is considered a Class D AM radio facility by the Federal Communications Commission, operating with 50,000 watts of power during the daytime, and 5,500 watts during critical hours (around sunrise and sunset) using a non-directional antenna. The station must sign off after local sunset to avoid interference to WHO in Des Moines, Iowa, which is a Class A clear channel station on the same frequency.

The radio station WPBS (AM) is not related to the Watertown, New York–based PBS TV station WPBS-TV or the Public Broadcasting Service.

== History ==
The station signed on 1050 kHz in 1979 as WCGA. The format was a locally produced and formatted CHR. It became automated as WTPO in 1986. The format then became gospel as WPBE ("Praise 1050") in 1989. In September 2003, the station changed operating frequency from its original 1050 kHz to its current dial position on 1040 kHz. In May 2005, the station changed its programming format from gospel music to the "Planeta X" Spanish talk radio format (which moved from 1310 WPBC).

In early 2008, it changed formats to "Spice Radio Atlanta" broadcasting with Desi/Hindi music and talk.

By mid-2009, the station was simulcasting with 1080 WFTD's "Atlanta Radio Korea" programming. The Korean programming of "Atlanta Radio Korea" was then heard exclusively on WPBS and dropped from WFTD, which then started carrying Spanish-language programming.

When Atlanta Radio Korea, owners of WPBS, purchased WQXI from Entercom and flipped it to from its simulcast of WSTR on December 15, Vietsong Media, owners of WFTD, purchased WPBS and has flipped the format to Vietnamese radio on January 1, 2017.

As of October 2026, WPBS began simulcasting WWSZ's mainstream urban format, known as "Streetz 94.5".
