= WFDR-FM =

Radio station in Woodbury, Georgia

- Woodbury, Georgia; United States
- Broadcast area: Columbus, Georgia
- Frequency: 94.5 MHz
- Branding: FOX-FM

Programming
- Format: Classic hits leaning Classic rock

Ownership
- Owner: Ploener Radio Group, LLC.; (P.B. Broadcasting of Georgia, LLC)
- Operator: Christopher Murray

History
- First air date: 2007; 19 years ago
- Call sign meaning: Franklin D. Roosevelt (Roosevelt's Little White House is in Meriwether County)

Technical information
- Licensing authority: FCC
- Facility ID: 171035
- Class: A
- ERP: 2,750 watts
- HAAT: 150 meters
- Transmitter coordinates: 32°50′40.00″N 84°37′25.00″W

Links
- Public license information: Public file; LMS
- Webcast: Listen Live
- Website: myfoxfm.com

WFDR-FM (94.5 FM; "FOX-FM") is a Classic hits leaning Classic rock formatted radio station licensed to Woodbury, Georgia, United States, and rimshotting portions of the Columbus, Georgia metropolitan area. The station is currently owned by Ploener Radio Group, LLC. while being operated by Christopher Murray's Georgia Radio Alliance.

Before Christopher Murray's Georgia Radio Alliance took control of WFDR-FM to expand his "FOX-FM" network of stations to yet another signal, Edgewater Broadcasting operated WFDR-FM with a simulcast of WWSZ "Streetz 94.5". The WWSZ simulcast on WFDR-FM mainly existed to remove any issues regarding W233BF in Atlanta, which shares WFDR's frequency. Prior to station was branded as "Mountain Country 94.5".
